= Architectuul =

- Available in: English
- Website: architectuul.com
- Launched: 2010; 16 years ago

Architectuul is an online architecture catalog that uses crowdsourcing to build content. It was founded in 2010 by a team of architects, graphic designers and software engineers. All of the text and many of the images uploaded to the site use a Creative Commons license, making the process similar to Wikipedia. Architectuul has buildings from various era's with a large range from the 20th Century and rare Constructivist architecture.

Architectuul is utilised as a source by several publications and Universities, including The Wall Street Journal.
