= Mosselprom Building =

Building in Moscow, Russia

Coordinates: 55.753919°N 37.602484°E

Mosselprom building
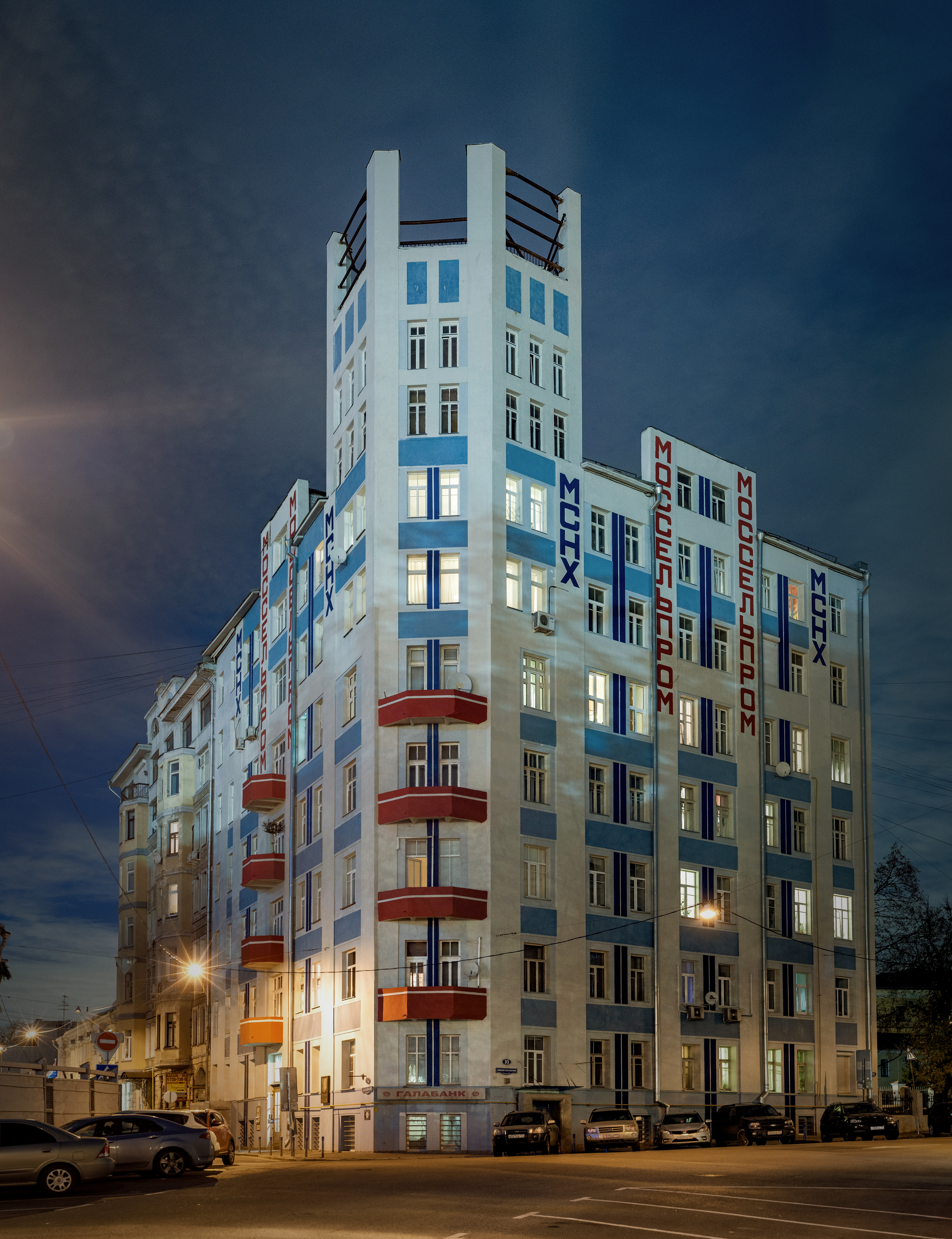
- Facade of the Mosselprom building in summer, October 2013 photograph
- Interactive map of the Mosselprom building area

General information
- Architectural style: Avant-garde, Constructivism
- Location: 2/10 Kalashny Side street, Moscow, Russia
- Construction started: 1912
- Completed: 1925
- Client: City of Moscow

Design and construction
- Architect: Nikolai Strukov

The Mosselprom building (Russian: Дом Моссельпрома) is a monument to Russian constructivism and avantgarde architecture. It is located in the centre of Moscow on an intersection between Kalashny, Nizhny Kislovksy and Maly Kislovky side streets. It was designed by architect N. D. Strukov and is notable for its painted panels by the artists Alexander Rodchenko and his wife Varvara Stepanova.

The building was originally intended as a seven-story apartment house with restaurant, built in 1912-13 by Strukov; however, it was hastily constructed and collapsed on March 22, 1913. A part of the structure was rebuilt by 1917; in 1923-1925 two more floors were added for storage and offices for Mosselprom, the Moscow Rural Cooperative Administration (Russian: Московское управление сельской промысловой кооперации), which combined flour, confectionery, and chocolate factories, breweries, and tobacco companies.

In the 1930s it reverted to an apartment building; the linguist Viktor Vinogradov lived there from 1964 to 1969. It was restored in 1997, and it currently houses a branch of the Russian Academy of Theatre Arts.
