= Yakov Chernikhov =

Russian architect and graphic designer

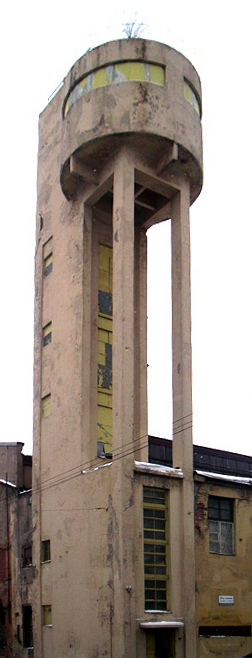
Tower of the 'Krasny Gvozdilshchik' ('Red Nailer') Factory in St. Petersburg, February 2006. Since 2021, the tower has been renovated by the "Setl Group"

Yakov Georgievich Chernikhov (ukr. Яків Георгійович Чернихов) (5 (17) December 1889 in Pavlograd, Yekaterinoslav Governorate, Russian Empire (now Pavlohrad, Ukraine) – 9 May 1951 in Moscow, Soviet Union) was a Russian architect and graphic designer known for working in the constructivist style. As an architect, painter, graphic artist, and architectural theorist, his greatest contribution was in the genre of architectural fantasy. He was described as the Soviet version of Claude Nicolas Ledoux, Giovanni Battista Piranesi, and Antonio Sant'Elia all at once. His books on architectural design published in Leningrad between 1927 and 1933 was also regarded amongst the most innovative texts (and illustrations) of their time.

== Early life ==
Chernikhov was born 17 December 1889, in Pavlograd, Katerynoslav province in a poor Jewish family composed of 11 children (five girls and six boys). His father, Georgy Pavlovich Chernikhov, owned restaurants on ships of the Volunteer Fleet. Their business suffered bankruptcy and their family moved to Odessa. A few years later, family moved back to Pavlograd to continue their life. After studying at the Grekov Odessa Art school, Ukraine, where his teachers were Gennady Ladyzhensky and Kiriyak Kostandi, leading artists of the South Russian school, he moved in 1914 to Petrograd (St. Petersburg) and joined the Architecture faculty of the Imperial Academy of Arts in 1916, where he later studied under Leon Benois.

== Career ==
Greatly interested in futurist movements, including constructivism, and the suprematism of Malevich (with whom he was acquainted), he set out his ideas in a series of books and scholarly works in the late 1920s and early 1930s, including:

- Osnovy sovremennoi arkhitektury (Fundamentals of Contemporary Architecture, 1930)
- Entazis i fust kolonny (Entasis and Shaft of the Column)
- Tsvet i svet (Color and Light)
- Estetika arkhitektury (Aesthetics of Architecture)
- Krasota v arkhitekture (Beauty in Architecture)
- The Art of Graphic Representation (1927)
- Analiz postroeniia klassicheskogo shrifta [Analysis of the Formation of Classical Fonts]
- Konstruktsii arkhitekturnykh i mashinnykh form (The Construction of Architectural and Machine Forms,1931)
- Arkhitekturnye fantazii. 101 kompozitsiia (101 Architectural Fantasies, 1933).

In his first book, Osnovy sovremennoi arkhitektury, he was already anticipating the appearance of several great skyscrapers of the future: the Palace of the Soviets (1932), the Moscow University building on Vorob’yovye (Sparrow) Hills (1955).

The 101 Architectural Fantasies, a very fine example of colour printing, was perhaps the last avant-garde art book to be published in Russia during the Stalinist era. Its remarkable designs uncannily predict the architecture of the later 20th century. However, his unusual ideas were not welcomed and distrusted by the regime. Although he continued his work as a teacher and held a number of one-man shows, few of his designs were built and very few appear to have survived. Amongst the latter is the tower of the 'Red Nailer' factory in St. Petersburg.

Chernikhov also produced a number of richly designed architectural fantasies of historic architecture, which were never exhibited in his lifetime. A book on 'The Construction of Letter Forms' containing some of his typographical designs, was published after his death in 1959.

Chernikhov was a tireless advocate for the importance of literacy in graphics. He believed that competency in representational skills — descriptive geometry, and drawing — was as necessary for every person as the ordinary skills of literacy. In addition to his very productive studio work, Chernikhov taught in the system of special workers’ classes (rabfak), was on the faculty of the architecture and construction departments of several institutions of higher learning, and developed a methodology for training students quickly and effectively in the fundamentals of graphics.

Chernikhov produced some 17,000 drawings and projects and was dubbed the Soviet Piranesi. On 8 August 2006, it was announced that some hundreds of Chernikhov's drawings, with an estimated value of $1,300,000, had gone missing from the Russian State Archives. Some 274 have been recovered, in Russia and abroad.

== See also ==
- List of Russian artists
- Constructivist architecture

== Sources ==
- Catherine Cooke, ed., Russian Constructivism and Iakov Chernikhov. Architectural Design profile 59, no. 7/8 (London: Academy Editions, 1989)
- Documenti e Riproduzioni dall'Archivio di Aleksej e Dimitri Cernihov (Illustrated) ed. Carlo Olmo and Alessandro de Magistris, publisher Umberto Allemandi, 1995, ISBN 88-422-0474-9, in Italian
- Graphic Masterpieces of Yakov Georgievich Chernikhov: The Collection of Dmitry Chernikhov by Dmitry Y. Chernikhov DOM Publishers 2008 in English
- Catherine Cooke, ed., Chernikov: Fantasy and Construction. Iakov Chernikov's Approach to Architectural Design, Architectural Design Profile 54, no. 9/10 (London: Academy Editions, 1984)

== Literature ==
Berkovich, Gary. Reclaiming a History. Jewish Architects in Imperial Russia and the USSR. Volume 2. Soviet Avant-garde: 1917–1933. Weimar und Rostock: Grunberg Verlag. 2021. Pp. 134-136. ISBN 978-3-933713-63-6
