= Constructivist architecture =

Soviet architecture, 1920s to early 1930s

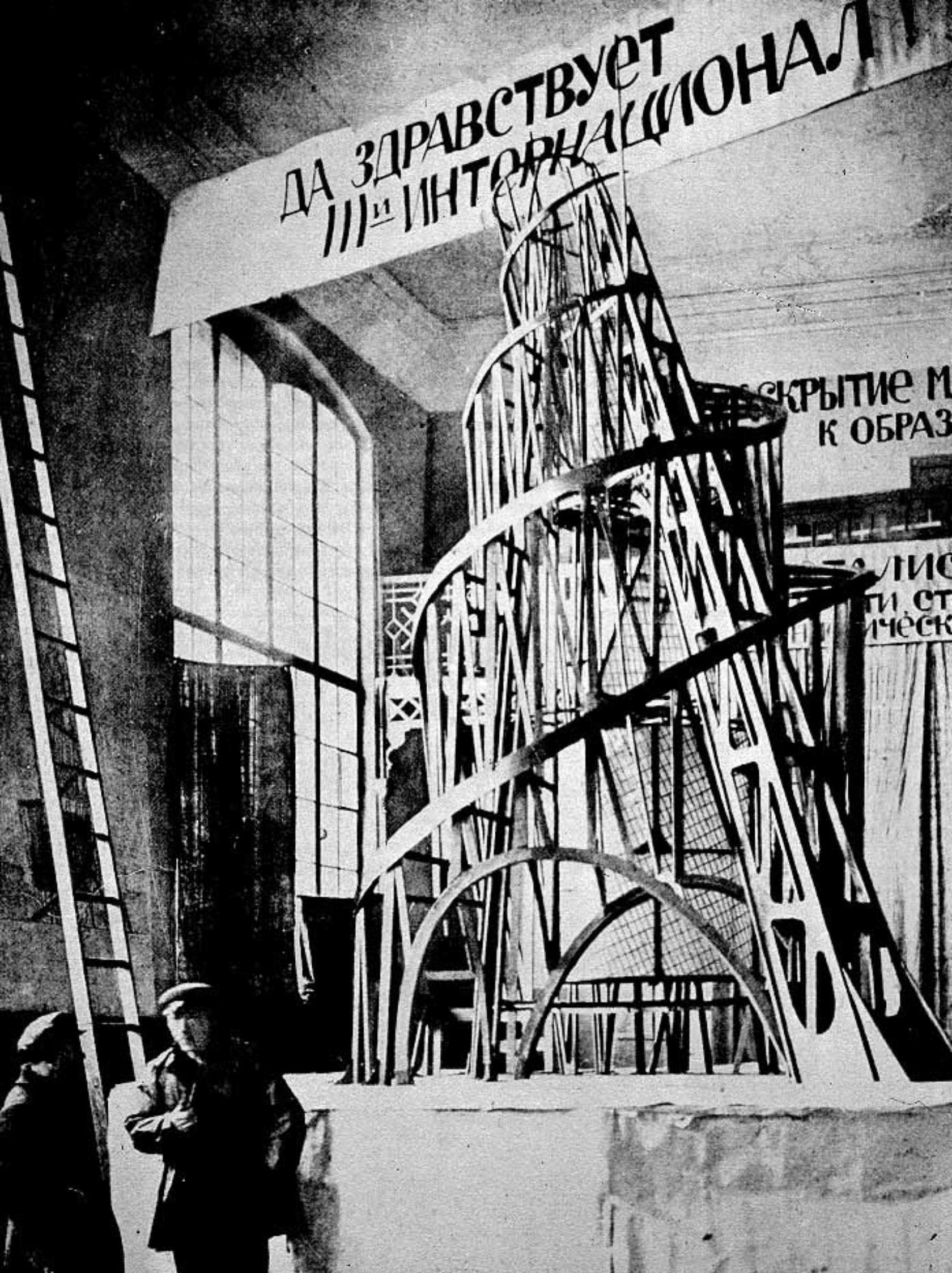
Tatlin's Tower, The Monument to the Third International, 1919 (Vladimir Tatlin)

Constructivist architecture was a constructivist style of modern architecture that flourished in the Soviet Union in the 1920s and early 1930s. Abstract and austere, the movement aimed to reflect modern industrial society and urban space, while rejecting decorative stylization in favor of the industrial assemblage of materials. Designs combined advanced technology and engineering with an avowedly communist social purpose. Although it was divided into several competing factions, the movement produced many pioneering projects and finished buildings, before falling out of favor around 1932. It has left marked effects on later developments in architecture.

== Definition ==
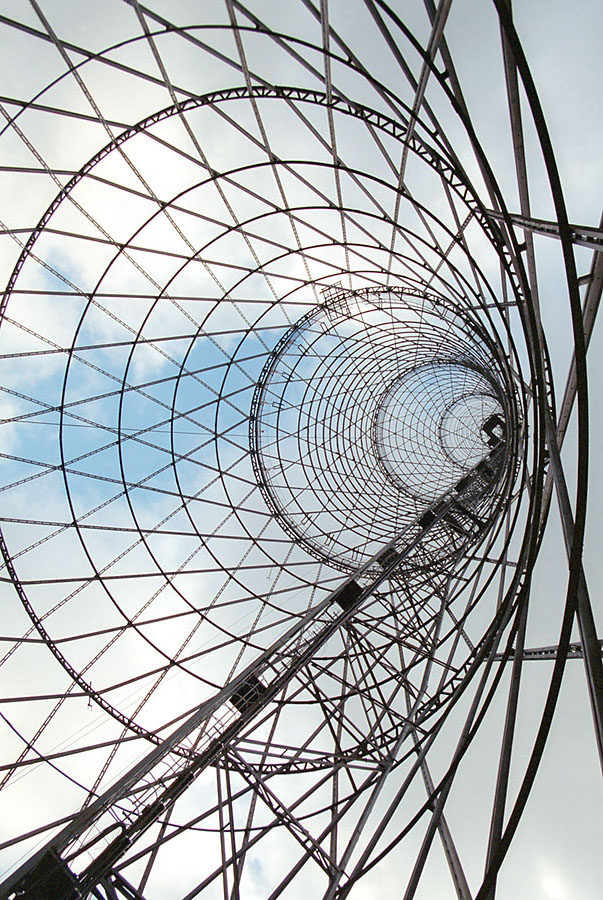
Shukhov Tower, Moscow, 1922

Constructivist architecture emerged from the wider Constructivist art movement, which grew out of Russian Futurism. Constructivist art had attempted to apply a three-dimensional cubist vision to wholly abstract non-objective 'constructions' with a kinetic element. After the Russian Revolution of 1917, it turned its attentions to the new social demands and industrial tasks required of the new regime. Two distinct threads emerged, the first was encapsulated in Antoine Pevsner's and Naum Gabo's Realist manifesto which was concerned with space and rhythm, the second represented a struggle within the Commissariat for Enlightenment between those who argued for pure art and the Productivists such as Alexander Rodchenko, Varvara Stepanova and Vladimir Tatlin, a more socially oriented group who wanted this art to be absorbed in industrial production.

A split occurred in 1922 when Pevsner and Gabo emigrated. The movement then developed along socially utilitarian lines. The productivist majority gained the support of the Proletkult and the magazine LEF, and later became the dominant influence of the architectural group O.S.A.

== A revolution in architecture ==
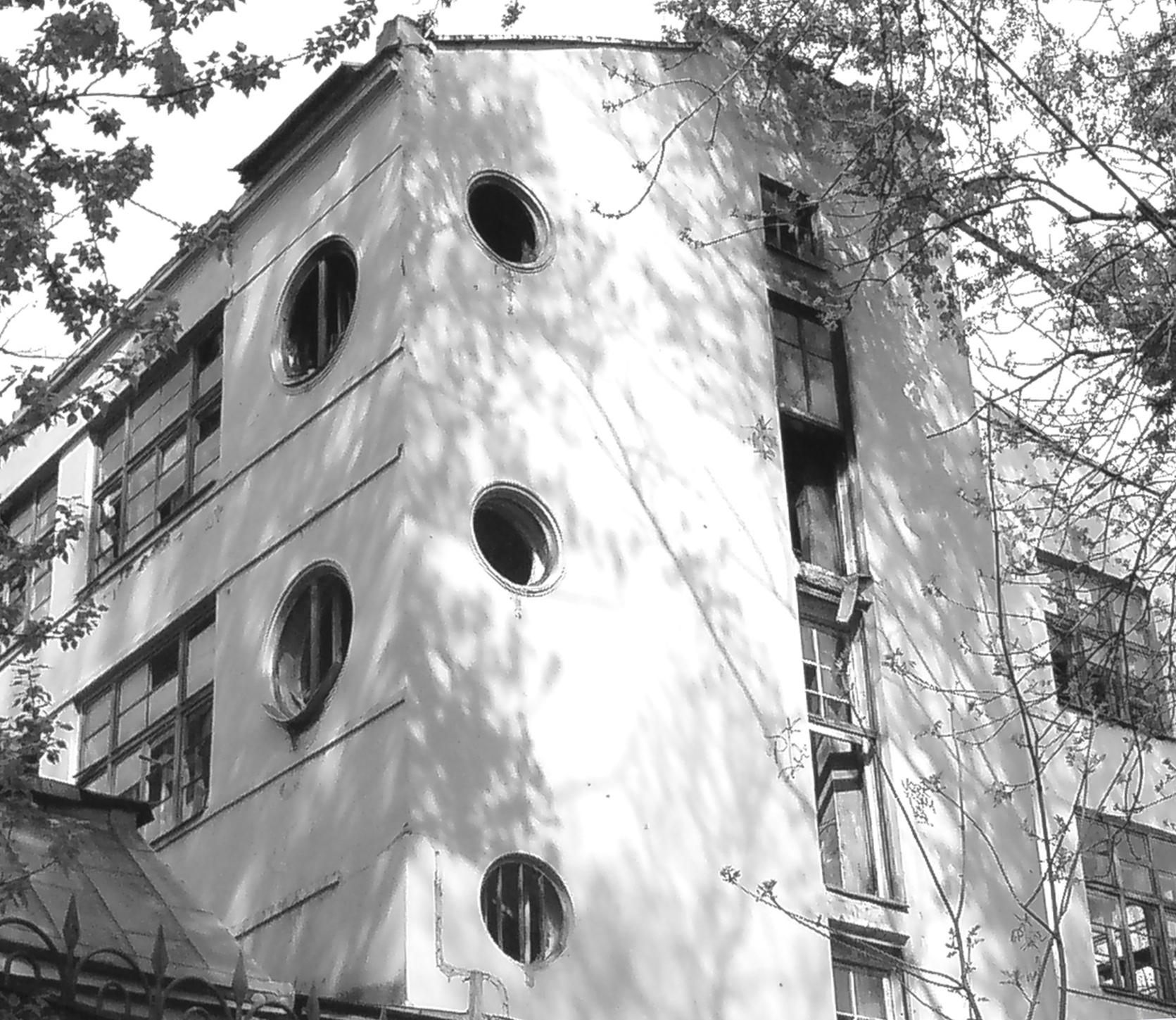
The print shop of Ogonyok magazine designed by El Lissitzky

The first and most famous Constructivist architectural project was the 1919 proposal for the headquarters of the Comintern in St Petersburg by the Futurist Vladimir Tatlin, often called Tatlin's Tower. Though it remained unbuilt, the materials—glass and steel—and its futuristic ethos and political slant (the movements of its internal volumes were meant to symbolise revolution and the dialectic) set the tone for the projects of the 1920s.

Another famous early Constructivist project was the Lenin Tribune by El Lissitzky (1920), a moving speaker's podium. During the Russian Civil War the UNOVIS group centered on Kasimir Malevich and Lissitzky designed various projects that forced together the 'non-objective' abstraction of Suprematism with more utilitarian aims, creating ideal Constructivist cities— see also El Lissitzky's Prounen-Raum, an architecture based on his "Proun" series, the 'Dynamic City' (1919) of Gustav Klutsis; Lazar Khidekel's Workers Club (1926) and his Dubrovka Power Plant and first Sots Town (1931–33).

== ASNOVA and rationalism ==
Immediately after the Russian Civil War, the USSR was too impoverished to commission any major new building projects. Nonetheless, the Soviet avant-garde school Vkhutemas started an architectural wing in 1921, which was led by the architect Nikolai Ladovsky, which was called ASNOVA (association of new architects). The teaching methods were both functional and fantastic, reflecting an interest in Gestalt psychology, leading to daring experiments with form such as Simbirchev's glass-clad suspended restaurant. Among the architects affiliated to the ASNOVA (Association of New Architects) were El Lissitzky, Konstantin Melnikov, Vladimir Krinsky and the young Berthold Lubetkin.

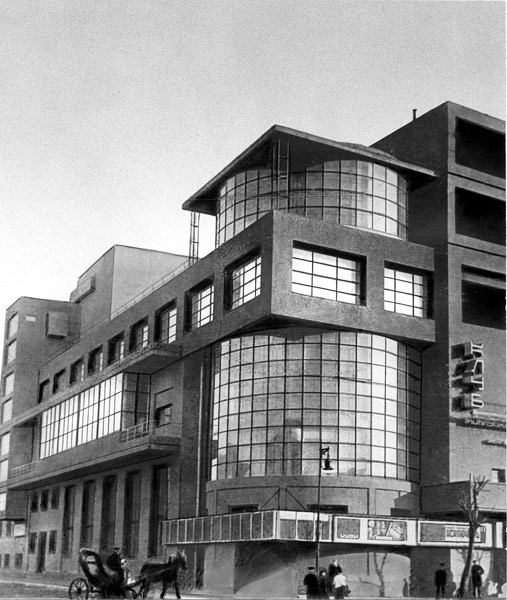
Zuev Workers' Club, 1927

Projects from 1923 to 1935 like Lissitzky and Mart Stam's Wolkenbügel horizontal skyscrapers and Konstantin Melnikov's temporary pavilions showed the originality and ambition of this new group. Melnikov would design the Soviet Pavilion at the Paris Exposition of Decorative Arts of 1925, which popularised the new style, with its rooms designed by Rodchenko and its jagged, mechanical form. Another glimpse of a Constructivist lived environment is visible in the popular science fiction film Aelita, which had interiors and exteriors modelled in angular, geometric fashion by Aleksandra Ekster. The state-run Mosselprom department store of 1924 was also an early modernist building for the new consumerism of the New Economic Policy, as was the Vesnin brothers' Mostorg store, built three years later. Modern offices for the mass press were also popular, such as the Izvestia headquarters. This was built in 1926–7 and designed by Grigori Barkhin

== OSA ==
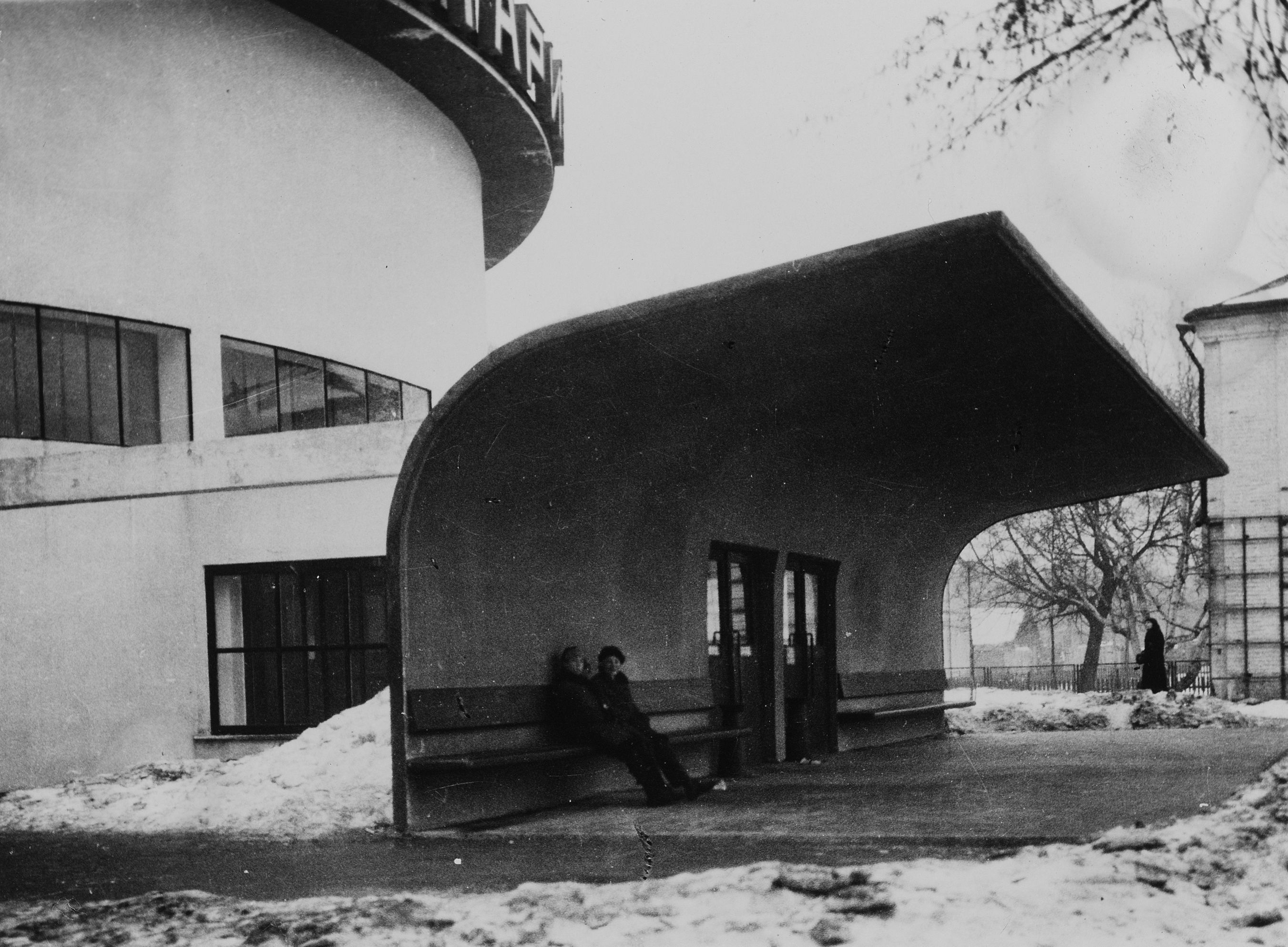
Barsch/Sinyavsky, Moscow Planetarium, 1929

A colder and more technological Constructivist style was introduced by the 1923/4 glass office project by the Vesnin brothers for Leningradskaya Pravda. In 1925 the OSA Group, also with ties to Vkhutemas, was founded by Alexander Vesnin and Moisei Ginzburg—the Organisation of Contemporary Architects. This group had much in common with Weimar Germany's Functionalism, such as the housing projects of Ernst May. Housing, especially collective housing in specially designed dom kommuny to replace the collectivised 19th century housing that was the norm, was the main priority of this group. The term social condenser was coined to describe their aims, which followed from the ideas of V.I. Lenin, who wrote in 1919 that "the real emancipation of women and real communism begins with the mass struggle against these petty household chores and the true reforming of the mass into a vast socialist household."

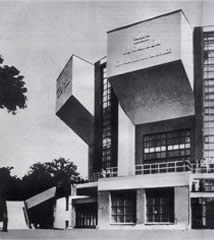
Rusakov Workers' Club in Moscow by Konstantin Melnikov, 1927–28

Collective housing projects that were built included Ivan Nikolaev's Communal House of the Textile Institute (Ordzhonikidze St, Moscow, 1929–1931), and Ginzburg's Moscow Gosstrakh apartments and, most famously, his Narkomfin Building. Flats were built in a Constructivist idiom in Kharkiv, Moscow and Leningrad and in smaller towns. Ginzburg also designed a government building in Alma-Ata, while the Vesnin brothers designed a School of Film Actors in Moscow. Ginzburg critiqued the idea of building in the new society being the same as in the old: "treating workers' housing in the same way as they would bourgeois apartments...the Constructivists however approach the same problem with maximum consideration for those shifts and changes in our everyday life...our goal is the collaboration with the proletariat in creating a new way of life". OSA published a magazine, SA or Contemporary Architecture from 1926 to 1930. The leading rationalist Ladovsky designed his own, rather different kind of mass housing, completing a Moscow apartment block in 1929. A particularly extravagant example is the 'Chekists Village' in Sverdlovsk (now Yekaterinburg) designed by Ivan Antonov, Veniamin Sokolov and Arseny Tumbasov, a hammer and sickle shaped collective housing complex for staff of the People's Commissariat for the Internal Affairs (NKVD), which currently serves as a hotel.

== The everyday and the utopian ==
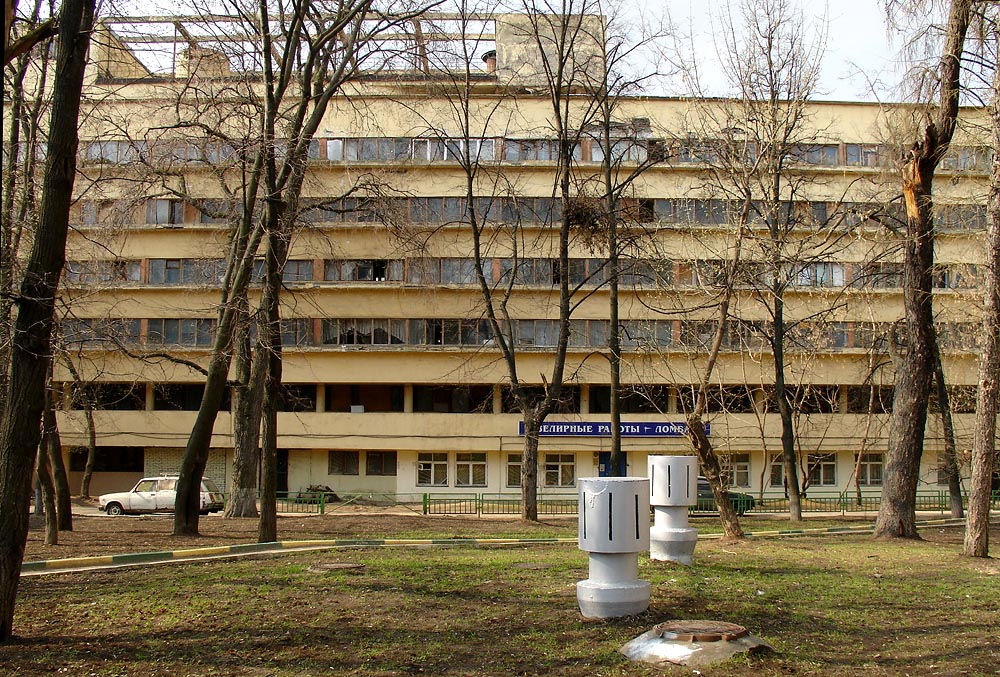
Narkomfin Building in Moscow by Moisei Ginzburg before its restoration in 2020. The building was at the top of UNESCO's 'Endangered Buildings' list, and there was an international campaign to save it.

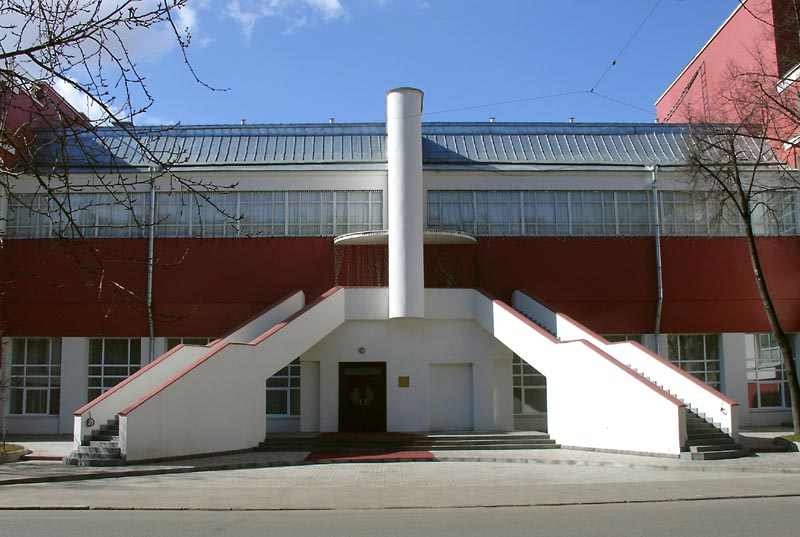
Svoboda Factory Club by Melnikov, Moscow

The new forms of the Constructivists began to symbolise the project for a new everyday life of the Soviet Union, then in the mixed economy of the New Economic Policy. State buildings were constructed like the huge Derzhprom complex in Kharkiv (designed by Serafimov, Folger and Kravets, 1926–1928) which was noted by Reyner Banham in his Theory and Design in the First Machine Age as being, along with the Dessau Bauhaus, the largest scale Modernist work of the 1920s. Other notable works included the aluminum parabola and glazed staircase of Mikhail Barsch and Mikhail Sinyavsky's 1929 Moscow Planetarium.

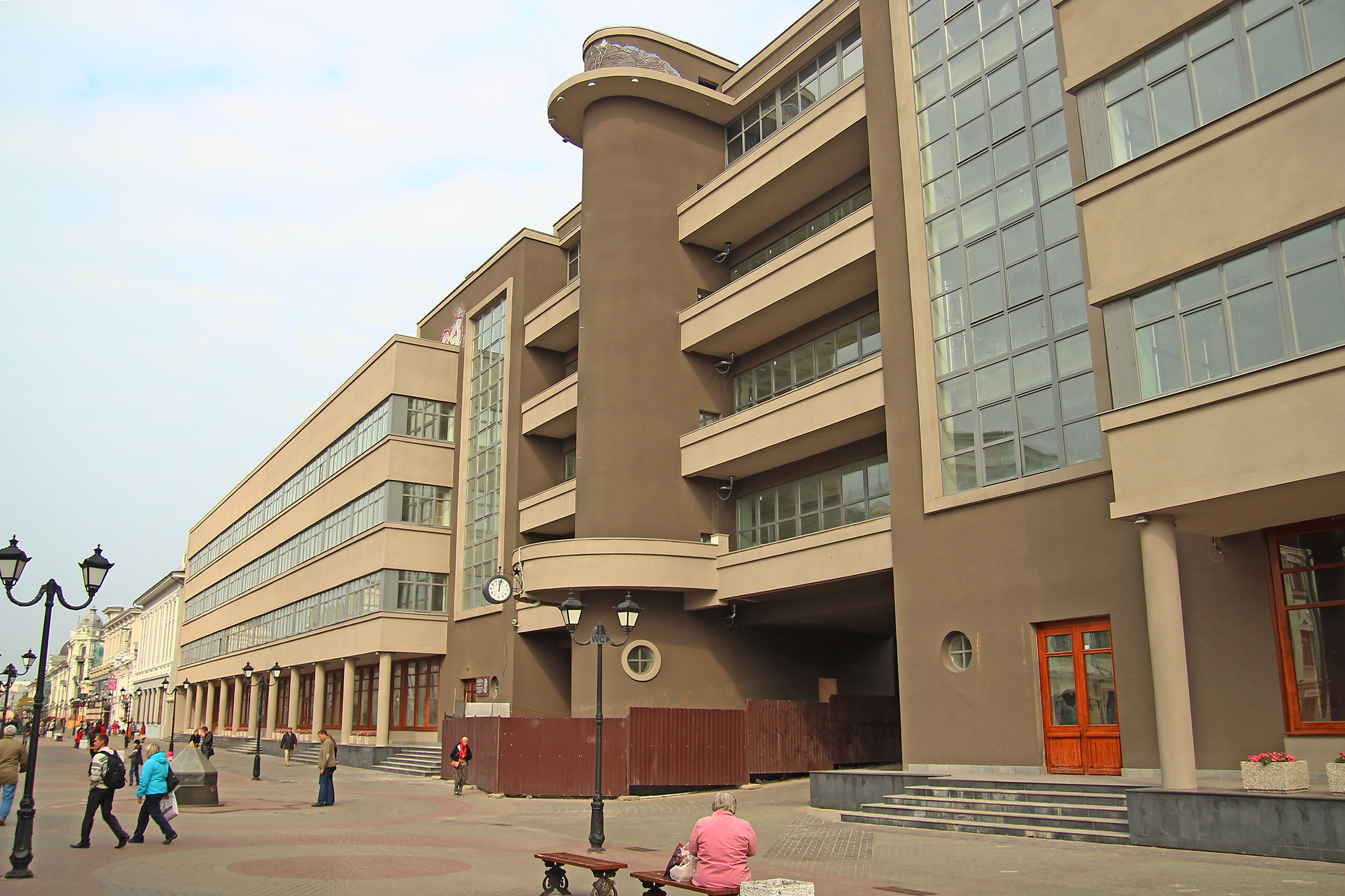
House of Printing (1935) in Kazan by Semyon Pen

The popularity of the new aesthetic led to traditionalist architects adopting Constructivism, as in Ivan Zholtovsky's 1926 MOGES power station or Alexey Shchusev's Narkomzem offices, both in Moscow. Similarly, the engineer Vladimir Shukhov's Shukhov Tower was often seen as an avant-garde work and was, according to Walter Benjamin in his Moscow Diary, 'unlike any similar structure in the West'. Shukhov also collaborated with Melnikov on the Bakhmetevsky Bus Garage and Novo-Ryazanskaya Street Garage. Many of these buildings are shown in Sergei Eisenstein's film The General Line, which also featured a specially built mock-up Constructivist collective farm designed by Andrey Burov.

A central aim of the Constructivists was instilling the avant-garde in everyday life. From 1927 they worked on projects for Workers' Clubs, communal leisure facilities usually built in factory districts. Among the most famous of these are the Kauchuk, Svoboda and Rusakov clubs by Konstantin Melnikov, the club of the Likachev works by the Vesnin brothers, and Ilya Golosov's Zuev Workers' Club.

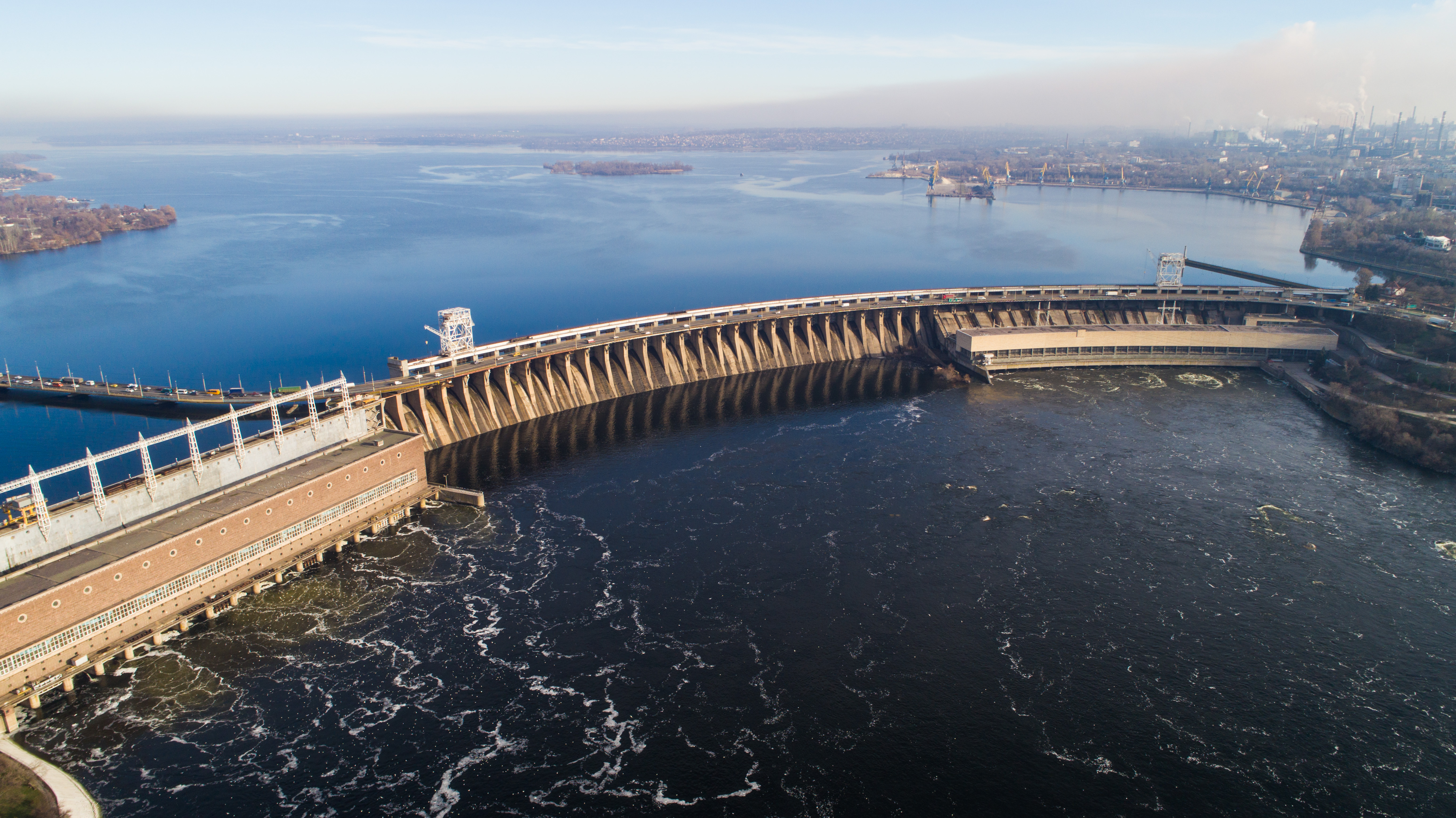
DniproHES (1932) by Vesnin Brothers

At the same time as this foray into the everyday, outlandish projects were designed such as Ivan Leonidov's Lenin Institute, a high tech work that bears comparison with Buckminster Fuller. This consisted of a skyscraper-sized library, a planetarium and dome, all linked together by a monorail; or Georgy Krutikov's self-explanatory Flying City, an ASNOVA project that was intended as a serious proposal for airborne housing. The Melnikov House and his Bakhmetevsky Bus Garage are fine examples of the tensions between individualism and utilitarianism in Constructivism.

There were also projects for Suprematist skyscrapers called 'planits' or 'architektons' by Kasimir Malevich, Lazar Khikeidel – Cosmic Habitats (1921–1922), Architectons (1922–1927), Workers Club (1926), Communal Dwelling (Коммунальное Жилище)(1927), A. Nikolsky and L. Khidekel – Moscow Cooperative Institute (1929). The fantastical element also found expression in the work of Yakov Chernikhov, who produced several books of experimental designs—most famously Architectural Fantasies (1933)—earning him the epithet 'the Soviet Piranesi'.

== The Sotsgorod and town planning ==
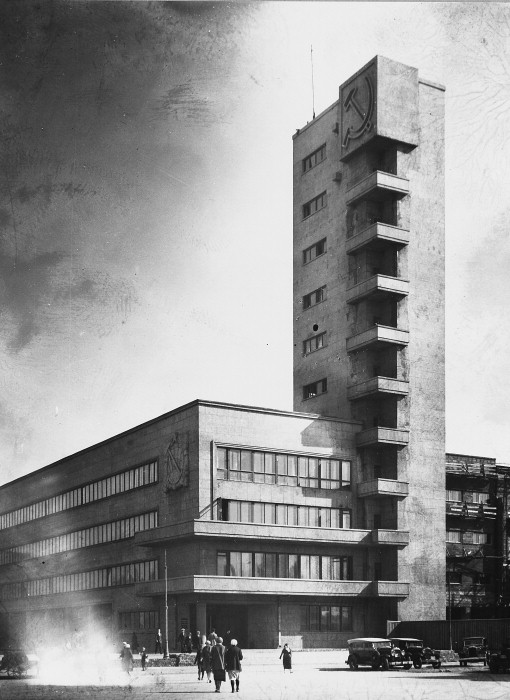
Town Hall by Noi Trotsky, Leningrad, 1932–1934

Despite the ambitiousness of many Constructivist proposals for reconstructed cities, there were fairly few examples of coherent Constructivist town planning. However, the Narvskaya Zastava district of Leningrad became a focus for Constructivism. Beginning in 1925 communal housing was designed for the area by architects like Alexander Gegello and OSA's Alexander Nikolsky, as well as public buildings like the Kirov Town Hall by Noi Trotsky (1932–4), an experimental school by G.A Simonov and a series of Communal laundries and kitchens, designed for the area by local ASNOVA members. An example of a finished Constructivist neighborhood is Sotsmisto (Sotsgorod) of Zaporizhzhia.

Many of the Constructivists hoped to see their ambitions realised during the 'Cultural Revolution' that accompanied the first five-year plan. At this point the Constructivists were divided between urbanists and disurbanists who favoured a garden city or linear city model. The Linear City was propagandised by the head of the Finance Commissariat Nikolay Milyutin in his book Sozgorod, aka Sotsgorod (1930). This was taken to a more extreme level by the OSA theorist Mikhail Okhitovich. His disurbanism proposed a system of one-person or one-family buildings connected by linear transport networks, spread over a huge area that traversed the boundaries between the urban and agricultural, in which it resembled a socialist equivalent of Frank Lloyd Wright's Broadacre City. The disurbanists and urbanists proposed projects for new cities such as Magnitogorsk were often rejected in favour of the more pragmatic German architects fleeing Nazism, such as 'May Brigade' (Ernst May, Mart Stam, Margarete Schütte-Lihotzky), the 'Bauhaus Brigade' led by Hannes Meyer, and Bruno Taut.

The city-planning of Le Corbusier found brief favour, with the architect writing a 'reply to Moscow' that later became the Ville Radieuse plan, and designing the Tsentrosoyuz government building with the Constructivist Nikolai Kolli. The duplex apartments and collective facilities of the OSA group were a major influence on his later work. Another famous modernist, Erich Mendelsohn, designed Leningrad's Red Banner Textile Factory and popularised Constructivism in his book Russland, Europa, Amerika. A Five Year Plan project with major Constructivist input was DniproHES, designed by Victor Vesnin et al. El Lissitzky also popularised the style abroad with his 1930 book The Reconstruction of Architecture in Russia.

== The end of constructivism ==
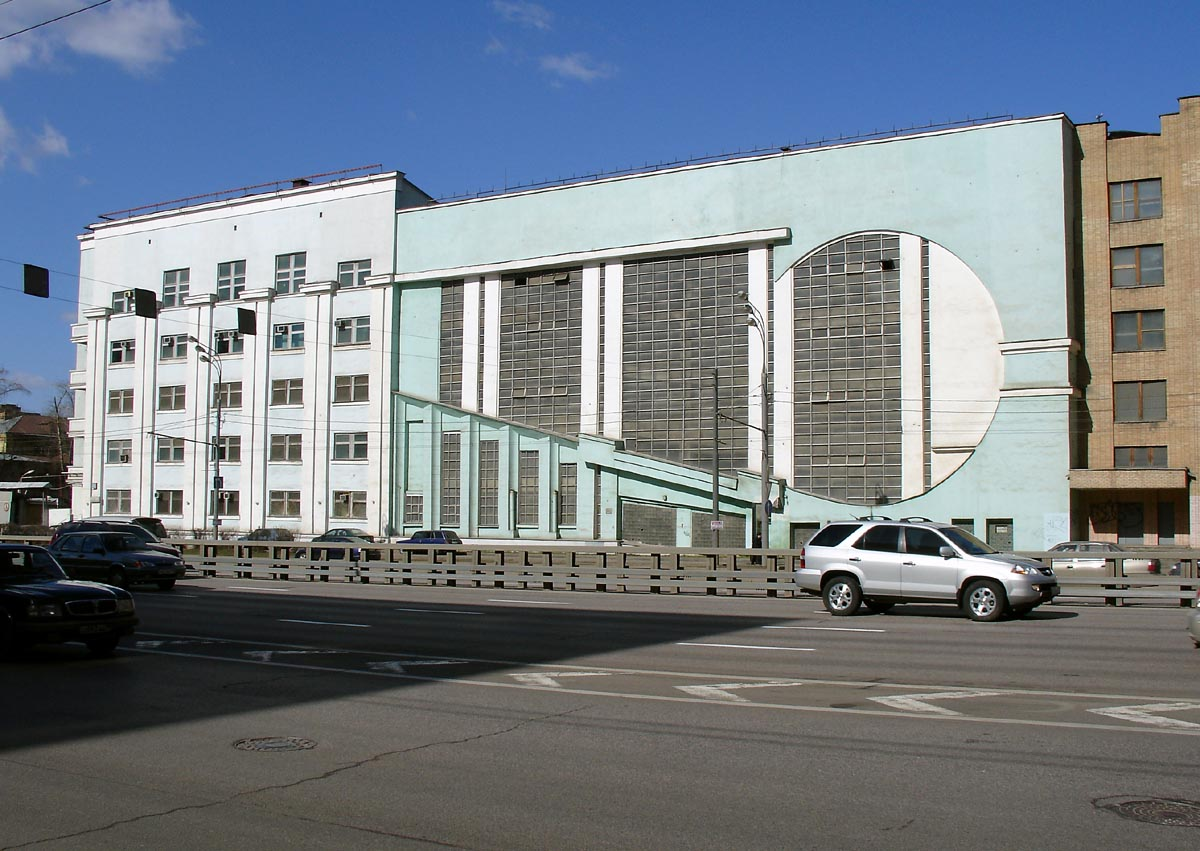
Intourist Garage by Konstantin Melnikov, 1933

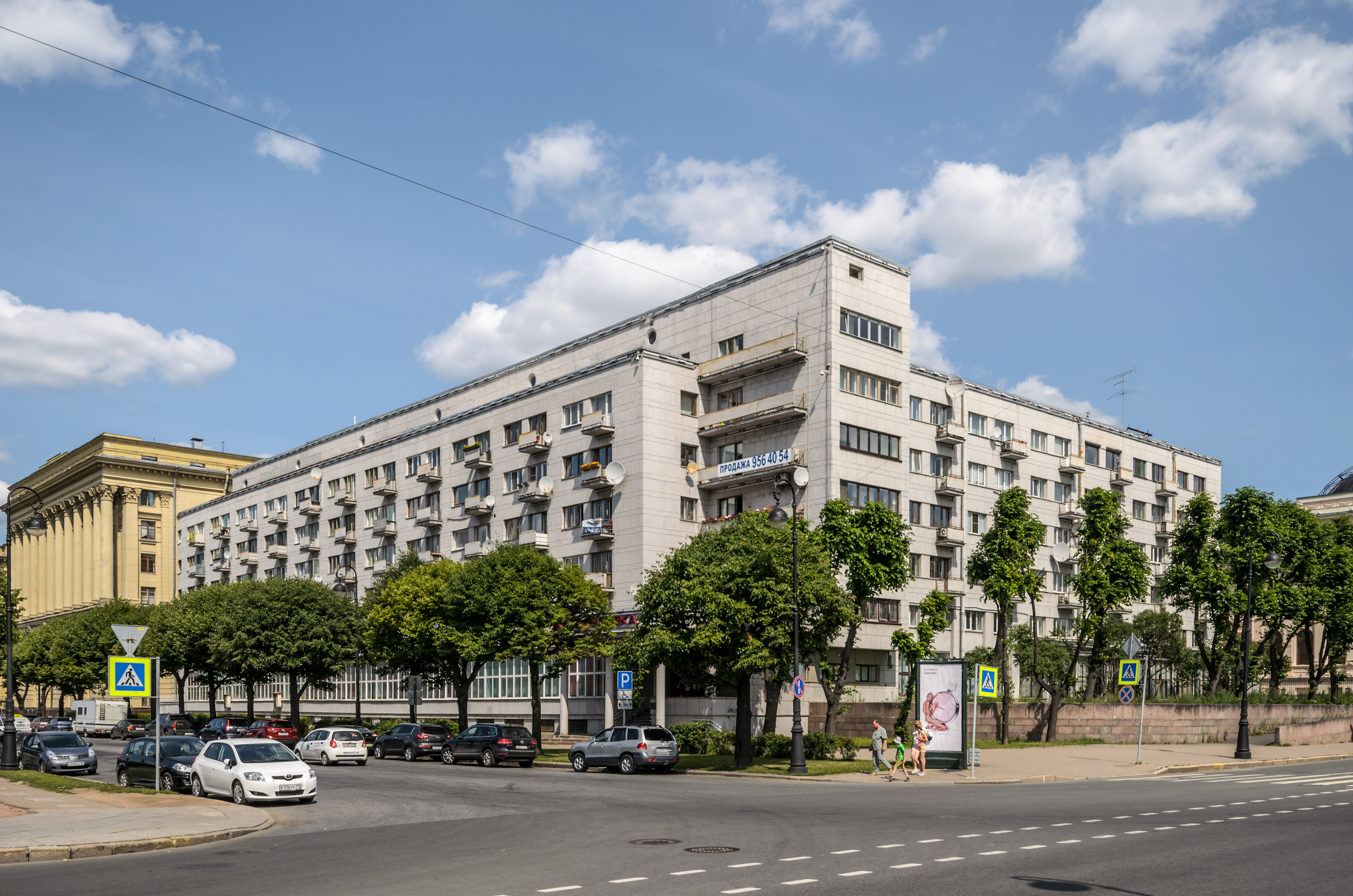
Political Convicts House in Saint Petersburg, 1933

The 1932 competition for the Palace of the Soviets, a grandiose project to rival the Empire State Building, featured entries from all the major Constructivists as well as Walter Gropius, Erich Mendelsohn and Le Corbusier. However, this coincided with widespread criticism of Modernism, which was always difficult to sustain in a still mostly agrarian country. There was also the critique that the style merely copied the forms of technology while using fairly routine construction methods. The winning entry by Boris Iofan marked the start of eclectic historicism of Stalinist Architecture, a style which bears similarities to Post-Modernism in that it reacted against modernist architecture's cosmopolitanism, alleged ugliness and inhumanity with a pick and mix of historical styles, sometimes achieved with new technology. Housing projects like the Narkomfin were designed for the attempts to reform everyday life in the 1920s, such as collectivisation of facilities, equality of the sexes and collective raising of children, all of which fell out of favour as Stalinism revived family values. The styles of the old world were also revived, with the Moscow Metro in particular popularising the idea of 'workers' palaces'.

A.Kuznetsov, V.Movchan, G.Movchan, L.Meilman, All-Union Electrotechnical Institute, Moscow, 1927–1930 (video)

By the end of the 1920s Constructivism was the country's dominant architecture, and surprisingly many buildings of this period survive. Initially the reaction was towards an art decoesque Classicism that was initially inflected with Constructivist devices, such as in Iofan's House on Embankment of 1929–32. For a few years some structures were designed in a composite style sometimes called Postconstructivism.

After this brief synthesis, Neo-Classical reaction was totally dominant until 1955. Rationalist buildings were still common in industrial architecture, but extinct in urban projects. Last isolated constructivist buildings were launched in 1933–1935, such as Panteleimon Golosov's Pravda building (finished 1935), the Moscow Textile Institute (finished 1938) or Ladovsky's rationalist vestibules for the Moscow Metro. Clearly Modernist competition entries were made by the Vesnin brothers and Ivan Leonidov for the Narkomtiazhprom project in Red Square, 1934, another unbuilt Stalinist edifice. Traces of Constructivism can also be found in some Socialist Realist works, for instance in the Futurist elevations of Iofan's ultra-Stalinist 1937 Paris Pavilion, which had Suprematist interiors by Nikolai Suetin.

== Legacy ==
Due in part to its political commitment—and its replacement by Stalinist architecture—the mechanistic, dynamic forms of Constructivism were not part of the calm Platonism of the International Style as it was defined by Philip Johnson and Henry-Russell Hitchcock. Their book included only one building from the USSR, an electrical laboratory by a government team led by Nikolaev. During the 1960s Constructivism was rehabilitated to a certain extent, and both the wilder experimental buildings of the era (such as the Globus Theatre or the Tbilisi Roads Ministry Building) and the unornamented Khrushchyovka apartments are in a sense a continuation of the aborted experiment, although under very different conditions. Outside the USSR, Constructivism has often been seen as an alternative, more radical modernism, and its legacy can be seen in designers as diverse as Team 10, Archigram and Kenzo Tange, as well as in much Brutalist work. Their integration of the avant-garde and everyday life has parallels with the Situationists, particularly the New Babylon project of Guy Debord and Constant Nieuwenhuys.

High Tech architecture also owes a debt to Constructivism, most obviously in Richard Rogers' Lloyd's building. Zaha Hadid's early projects were adaptations of Malevich's Architektons, and the influence of Chernikhov is clear on her drawings. Deconstructivism evokes the dynamism of Constructivism, though without the social aspect, as in the work of Coop Himmelb(l)au. In the late 1970s Rem Koolhaas wrote a parable on the political trajectory of Constructivism called The Story of the Pool, in which Constructivists escape from the USSR in a self-powering Modernist swimming pool, only to die, after being criticised for much the same reasons as they were under Stalinism, soon after their arrival in the USA. Meanwhile, many of the original Constructivist buildings are poorly preserved or in danger of imminent demolition.

== Gallery ==
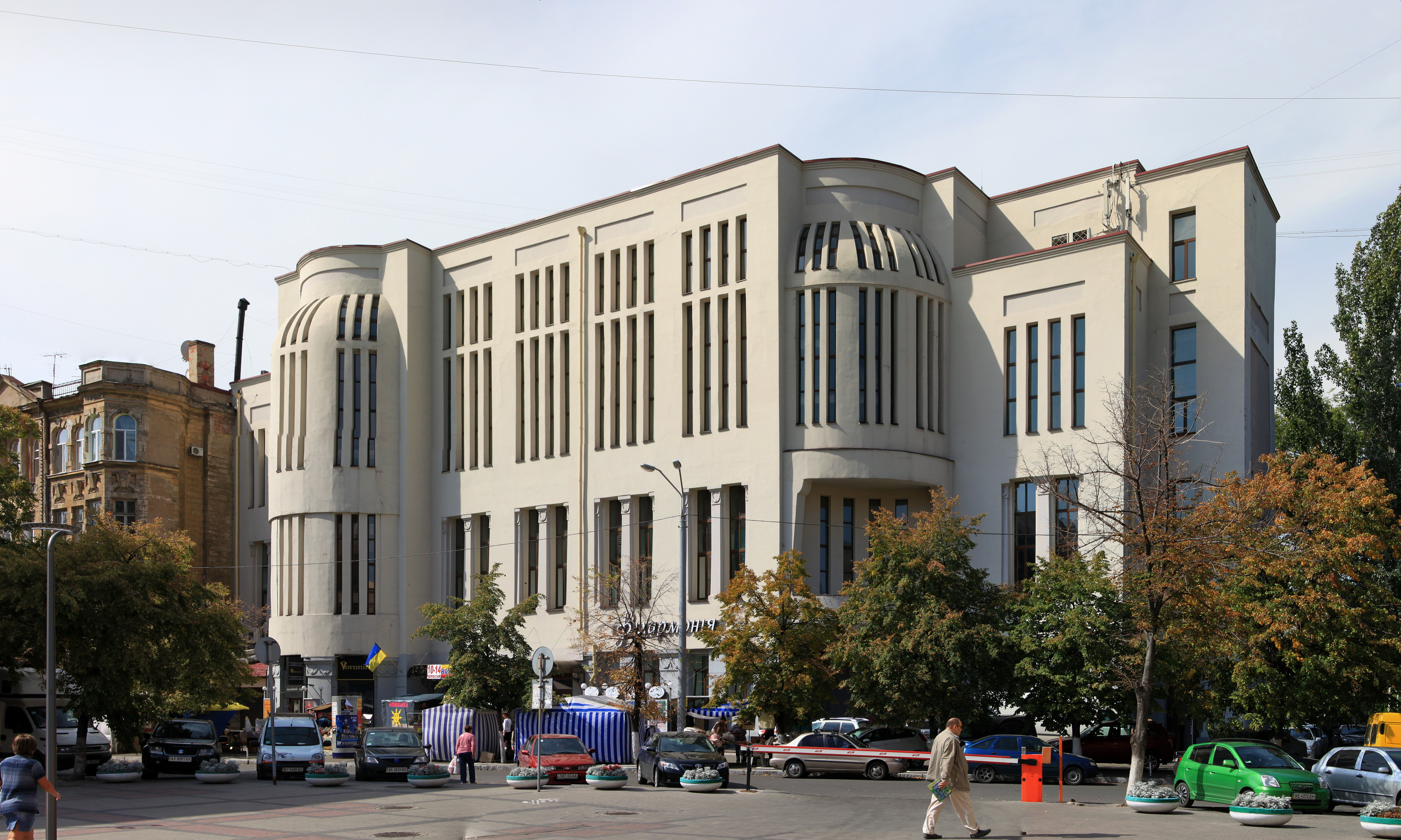
Public Assembly Building (now Philharmonic Theater) in Dnipro (1912), which is considered a precursor of Constructivism.

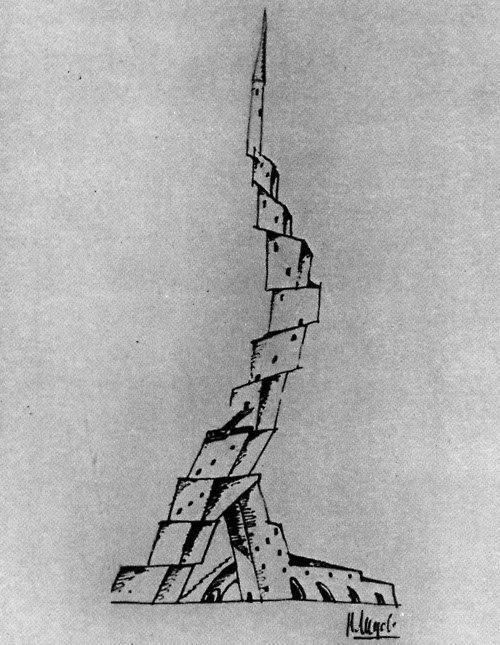
Collective Housing design (Nikolai Ladovsky, 1920)

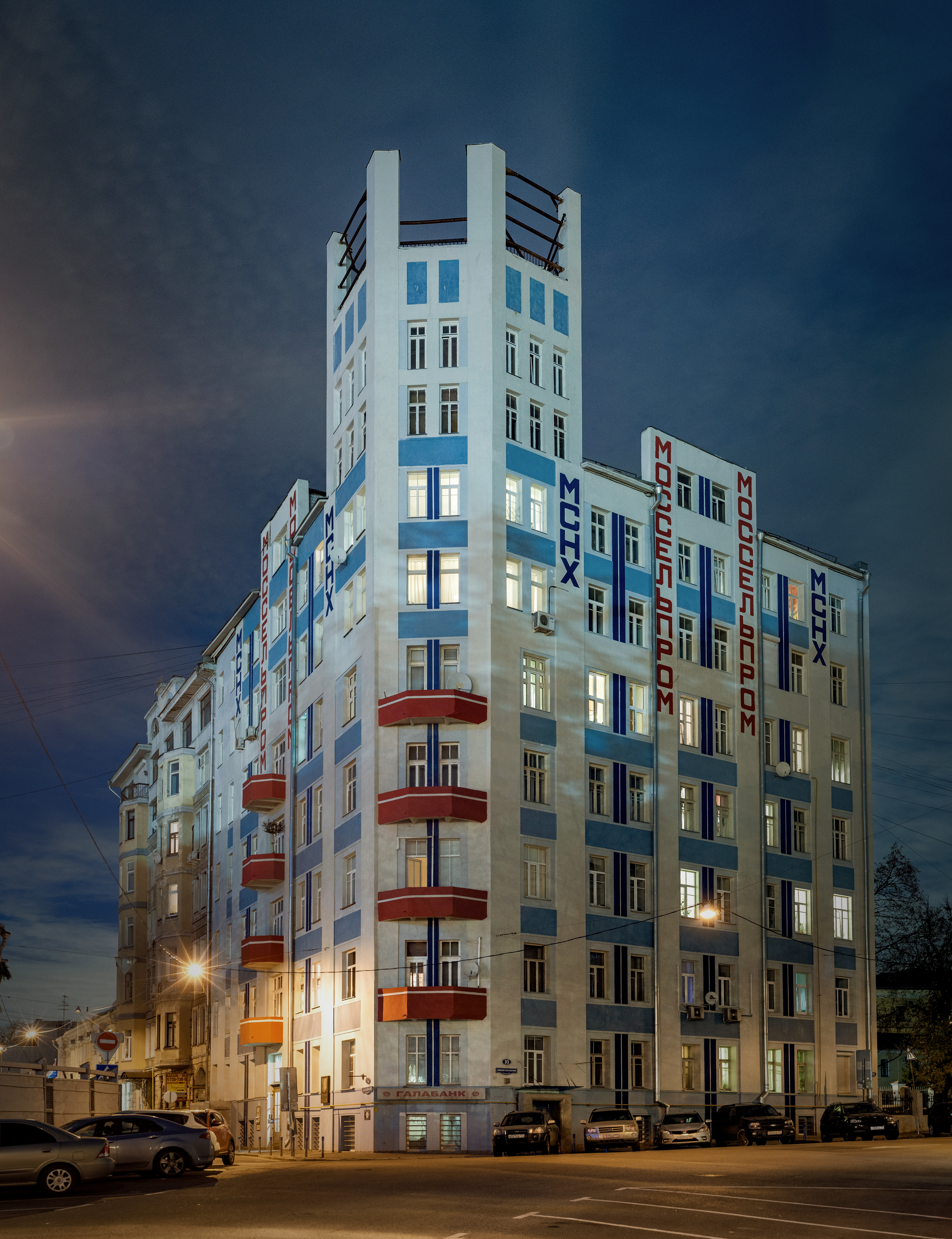
Mosselprom building (David Kogan, 1923–4)

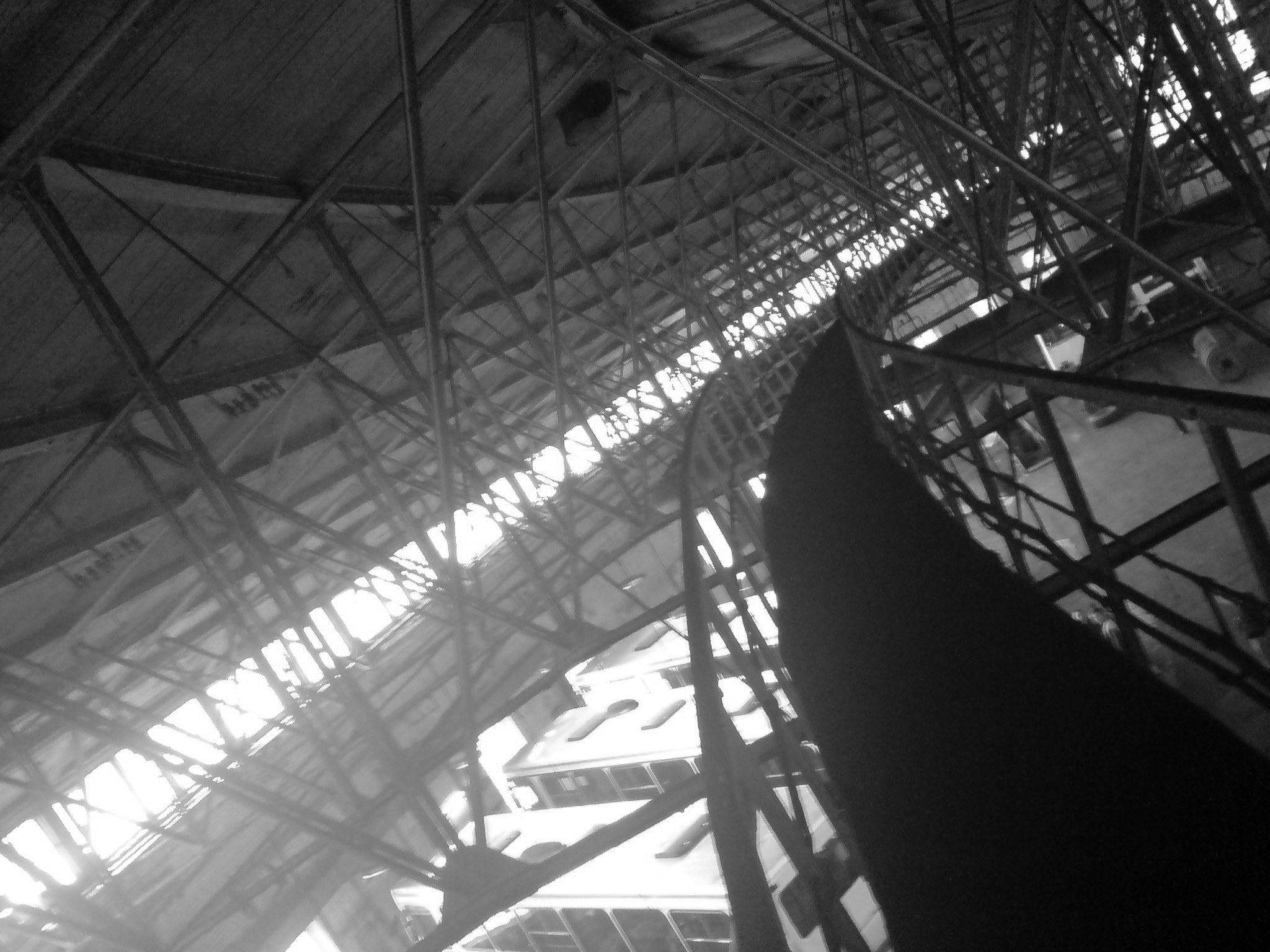
Novo-Ryazanskaya Street Garage (Melnikov, 1926)

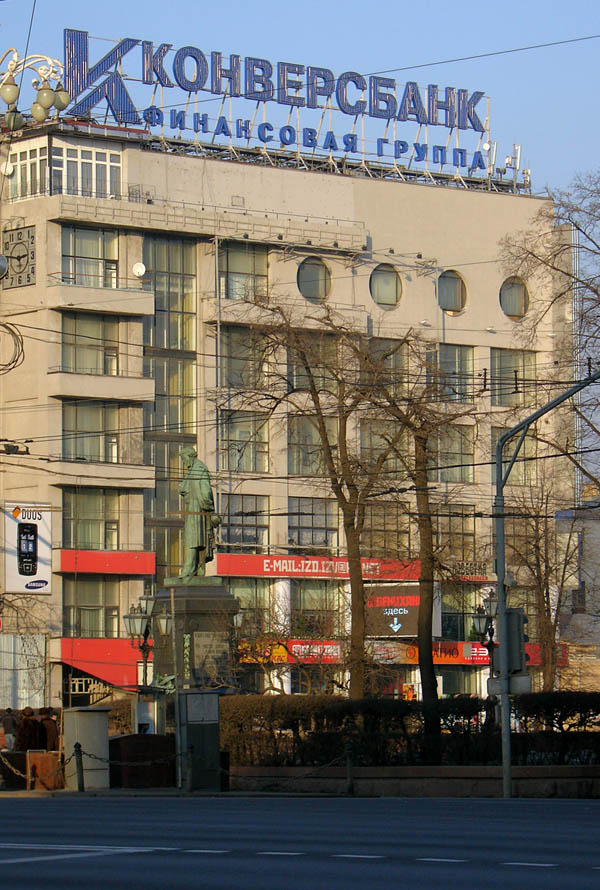
Izvestia Building, Moscow (Grigori & Mikhail Barkhin, 1926)

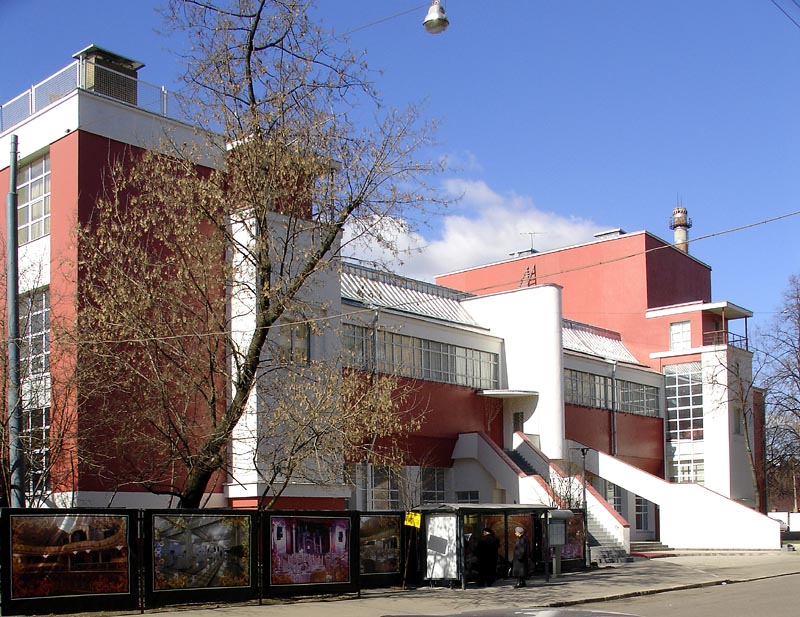
Svoboda Factory Club (Melnikov, 1927)

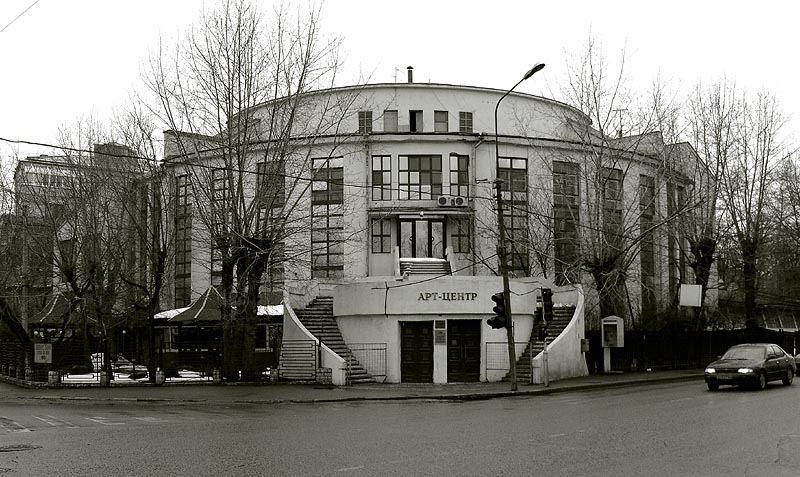
Kauchuk Factory Club (Melnikov, 1927)

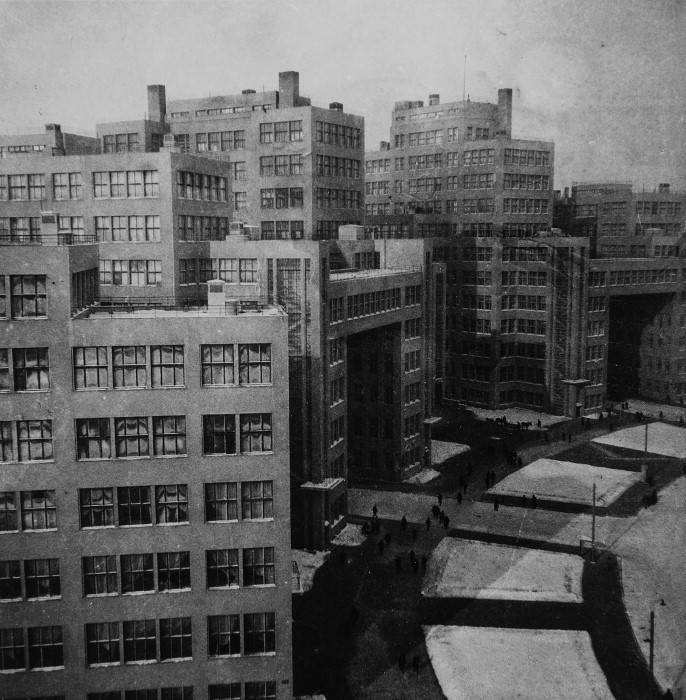
Derzhprom in Kharkiv, (Sergei Serafimov, Samuel Kravets and Mark Felger, late 1920s)

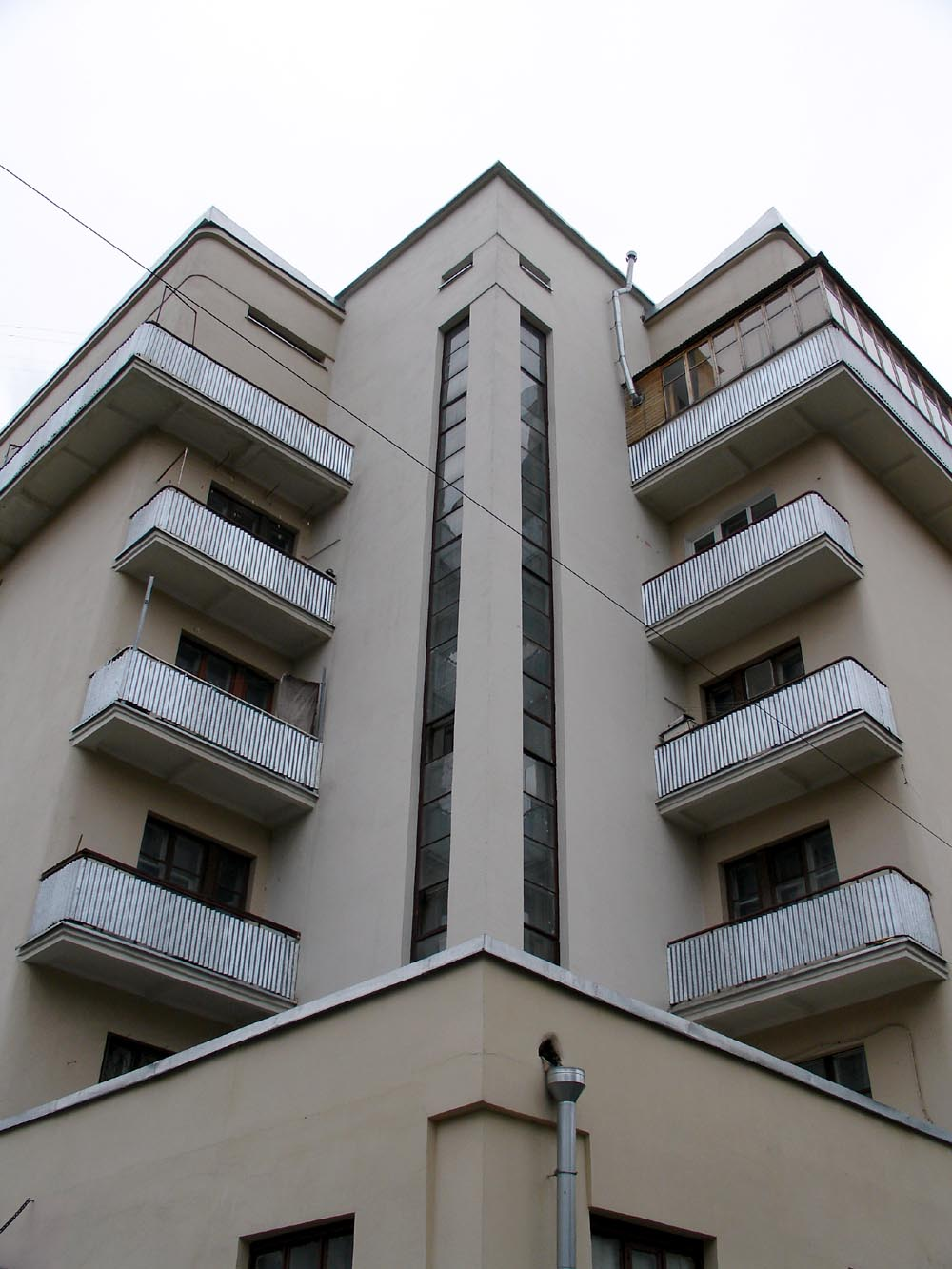
Flats, Zamoskvorechye, Moscow (late 1920s)

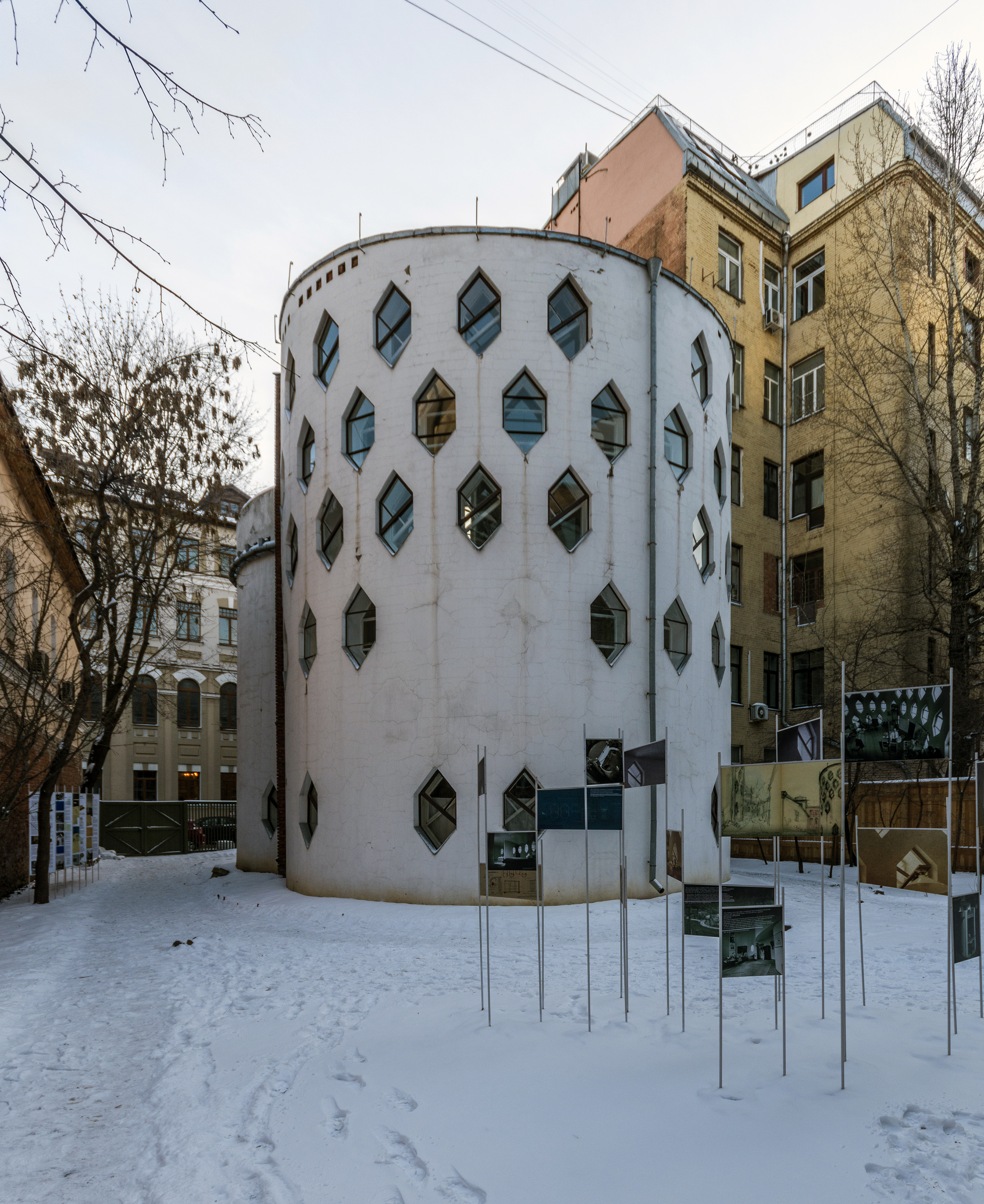
Melnikov House in Moscow. It was at the top of UNESCO's list of "Endangered Buildings". There is an international campaign to save it.

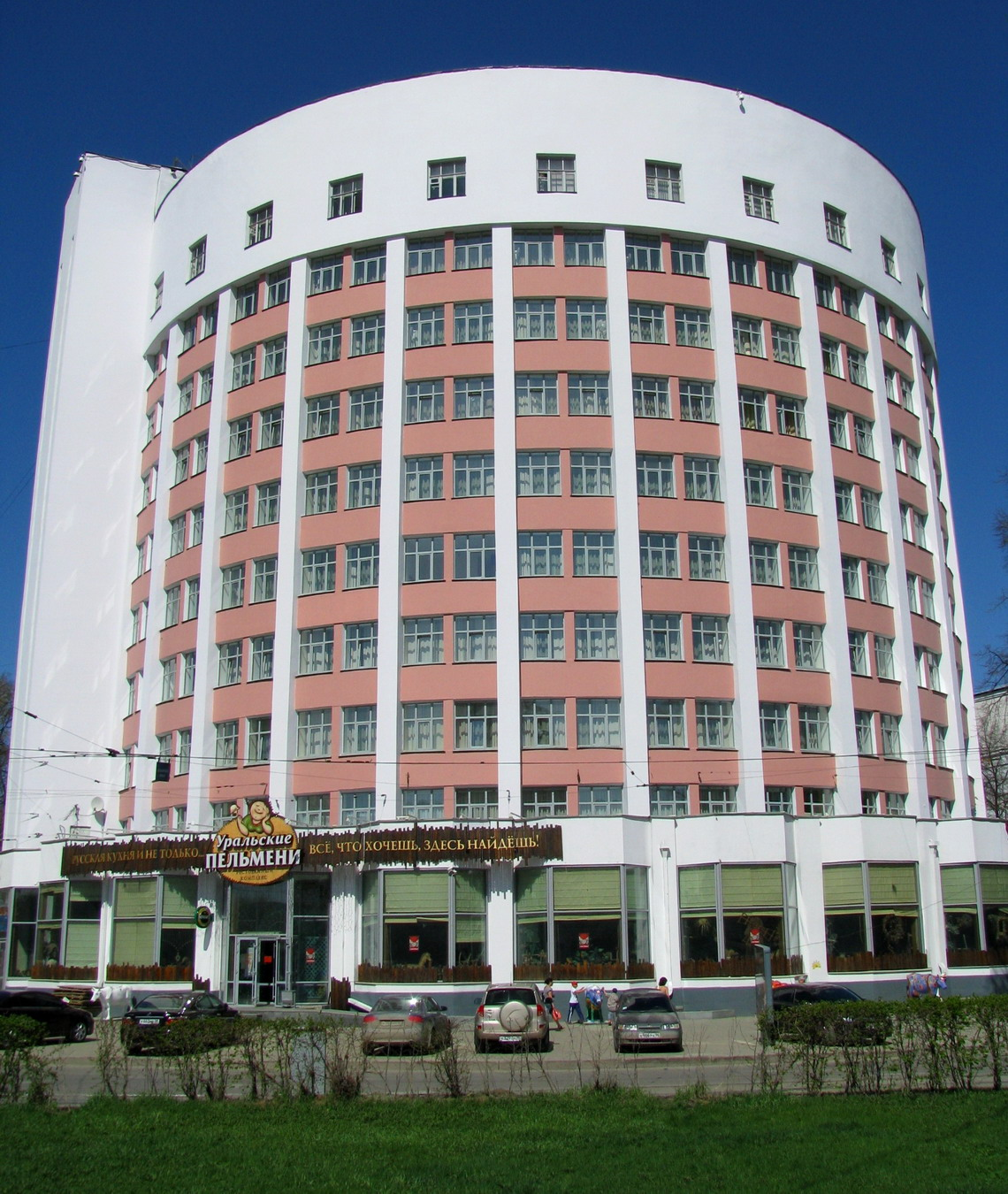
Hotel Iset (Yekaterinburg, Chekists Village)

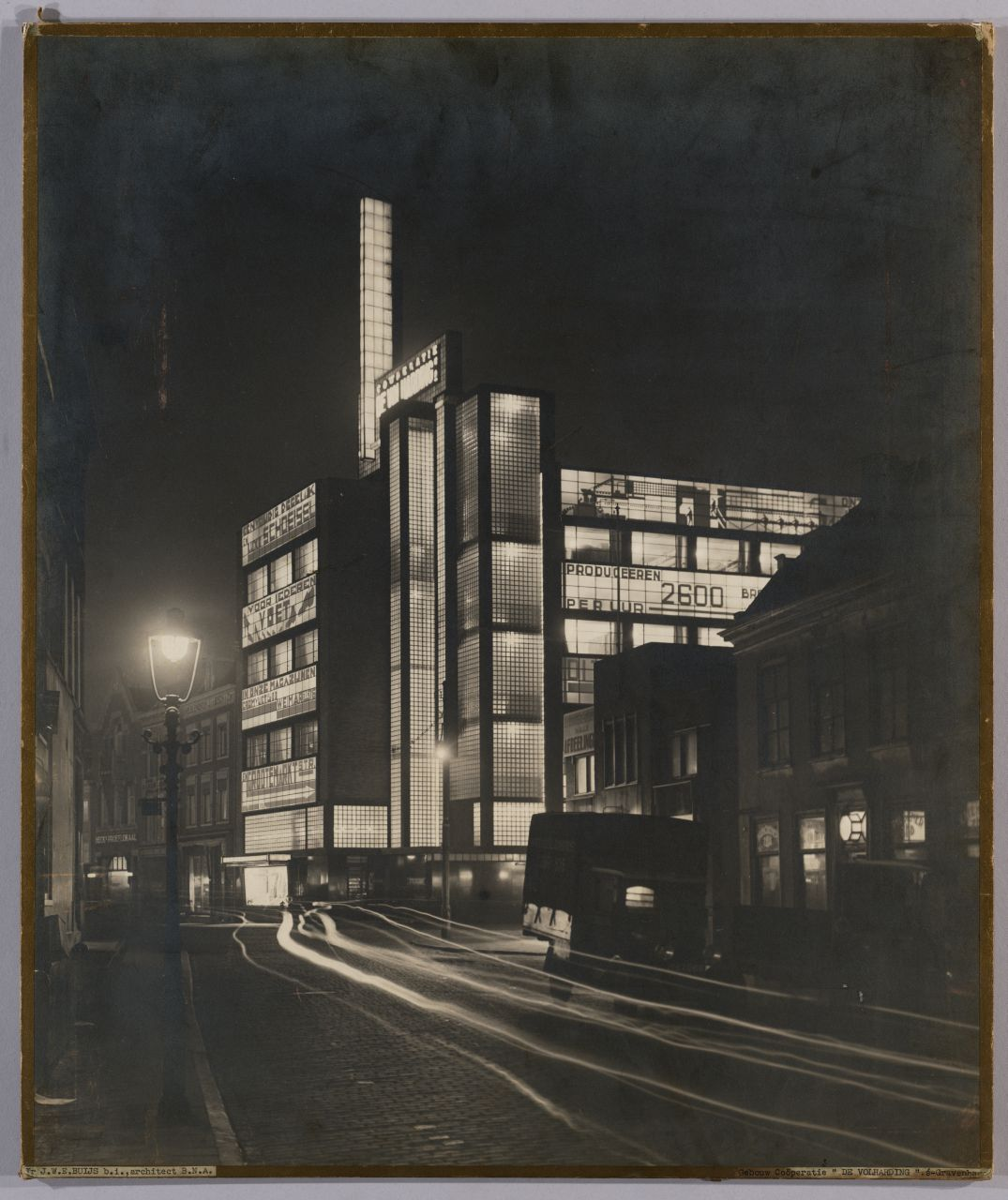
De Volharding, mixed-use building by Jan Buijs (The Hague, 1927–28)

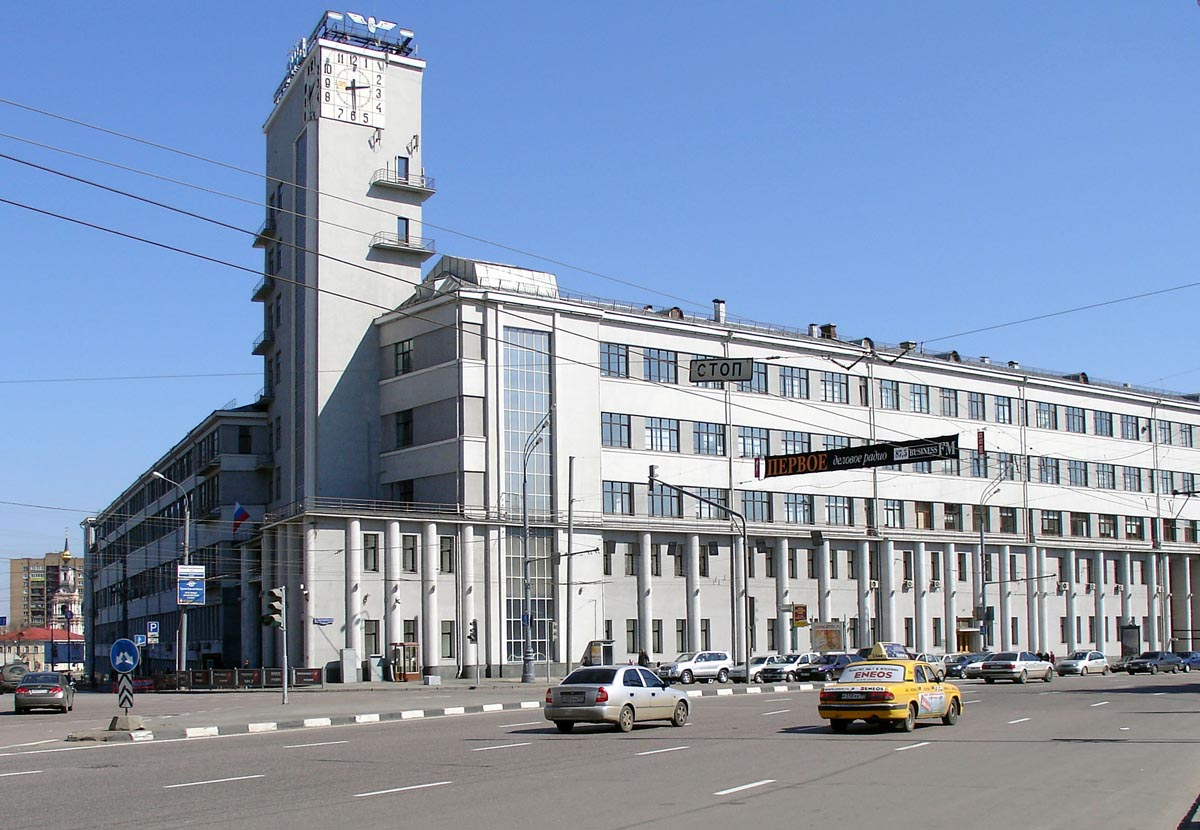
The Peoples Commissariat For Communication Lines (Ivan Fomin, 1929)

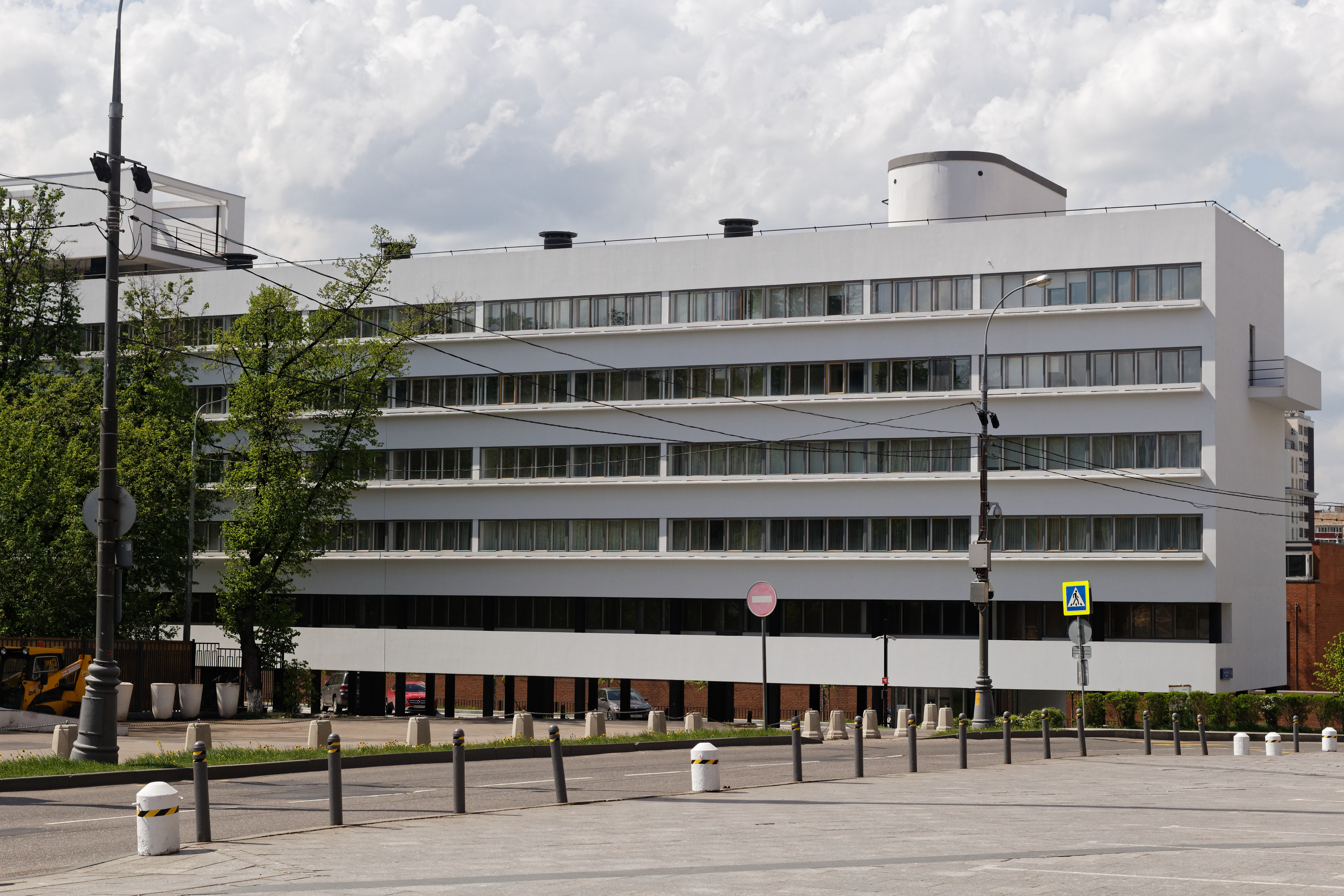
Narkomfin Building, apartment house (Moisei Ginzburg, 1930)

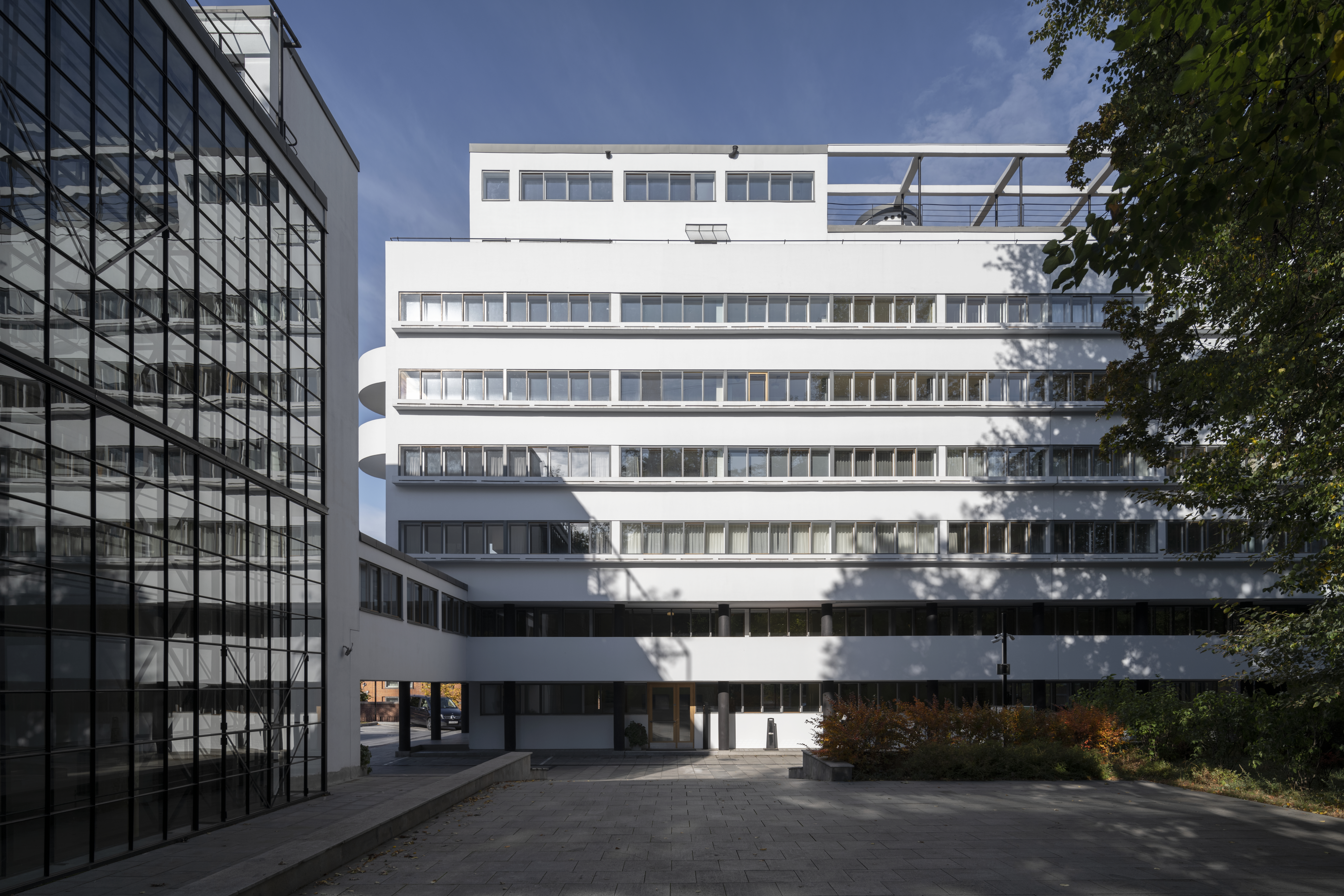
Narkomfin Building, apartment house (Moisei Ginzburg, 1930)

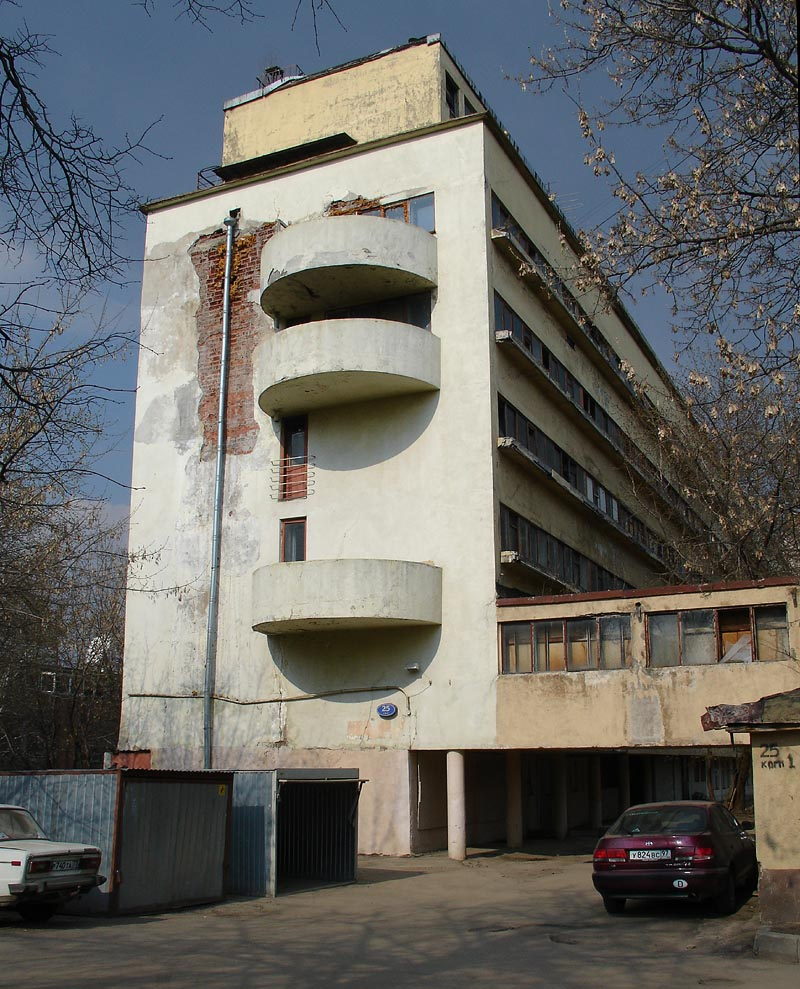
Narkomfin Building before its restoration in 2020 (Moisei Ginzburg, 1930)

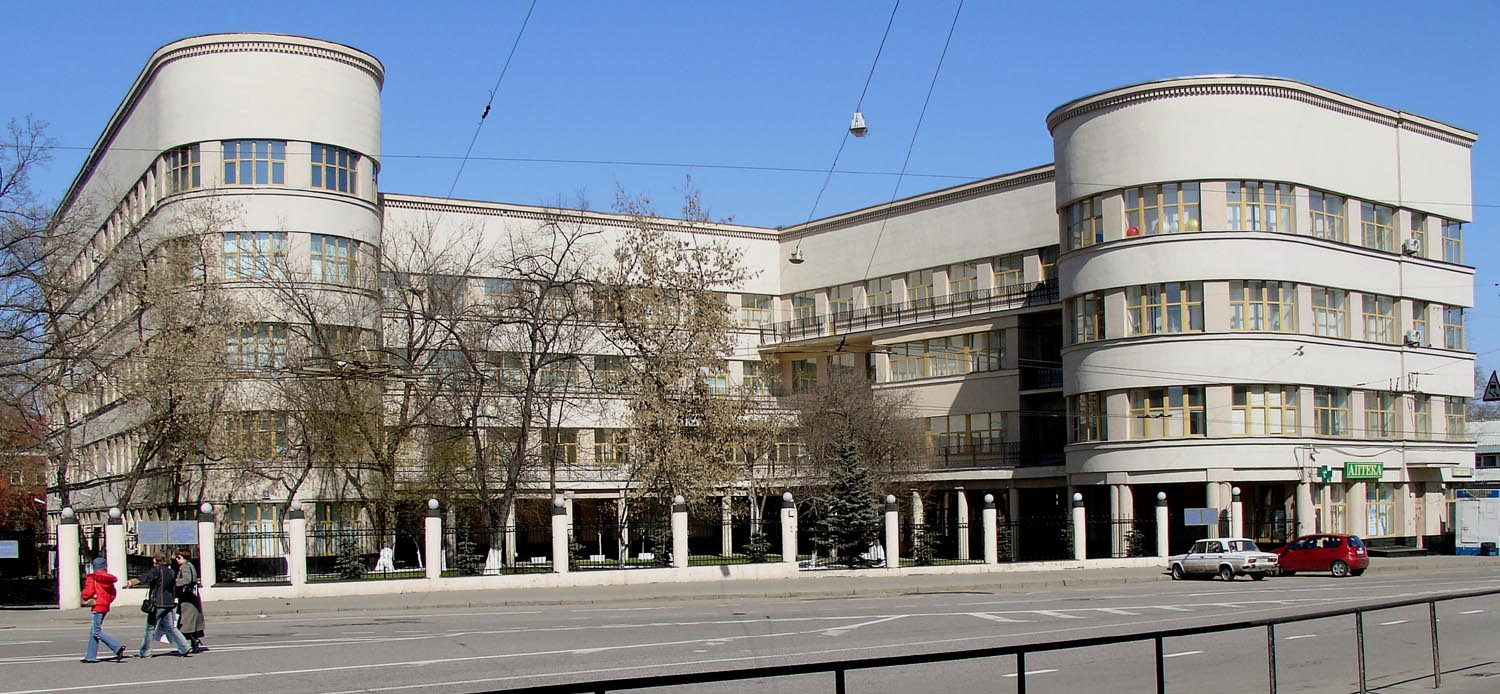
MPS Building, Moscow (Ivan Fomin, 1930s)

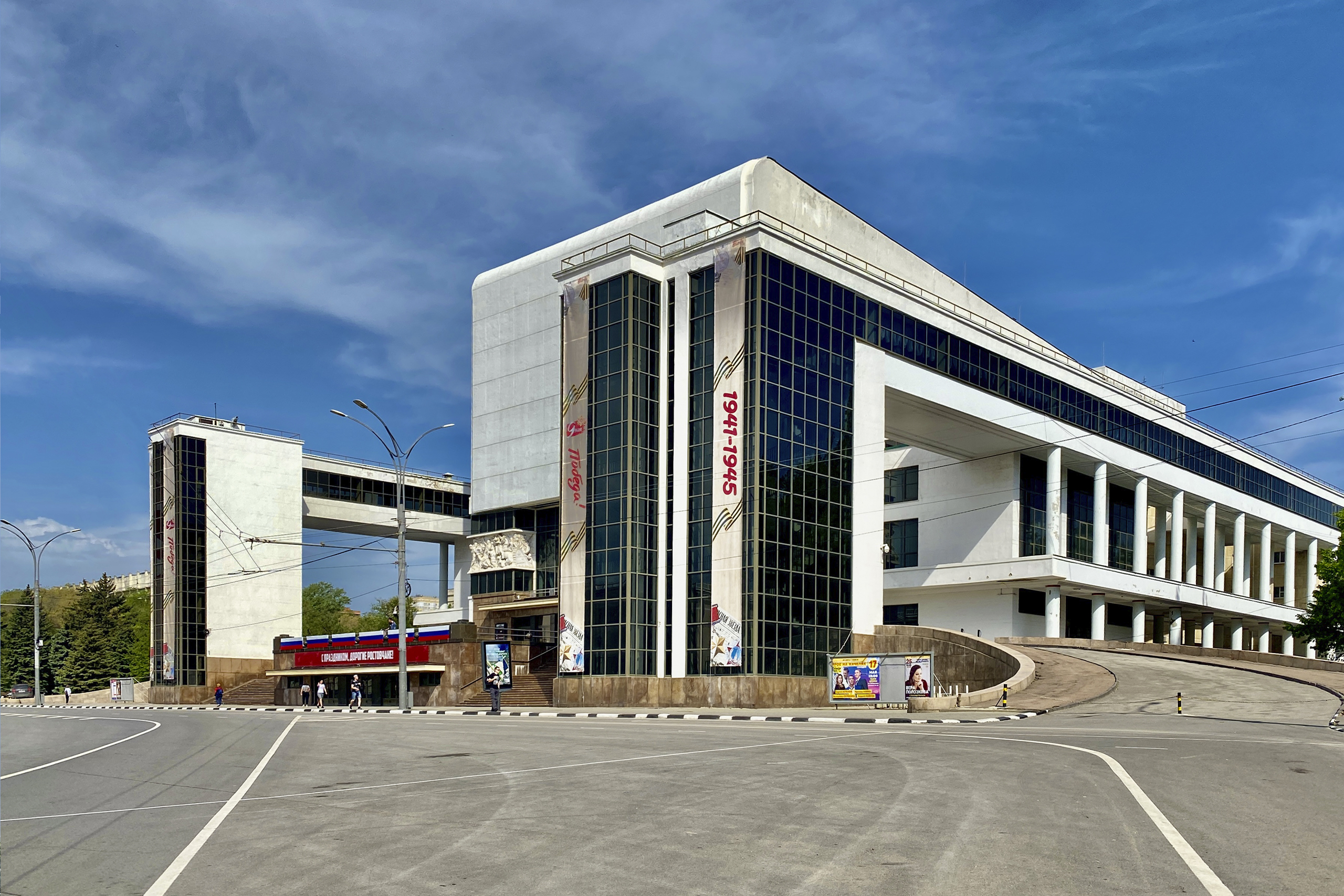
Maxim Gorky Theatre, Rostov-na-Donu, 1935

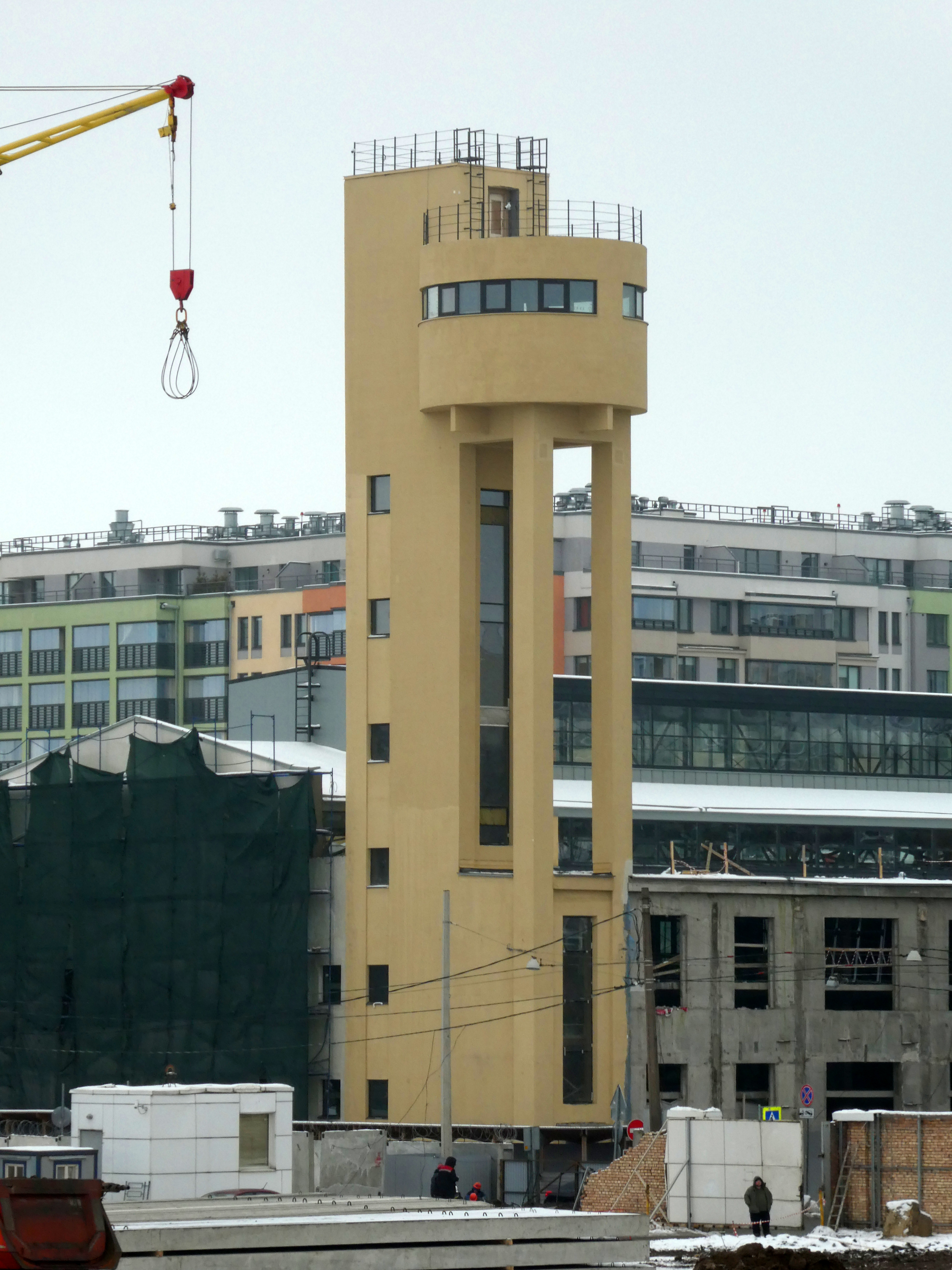
Red Carnation Factory, St Petersburg (Yakov Chernikhov)

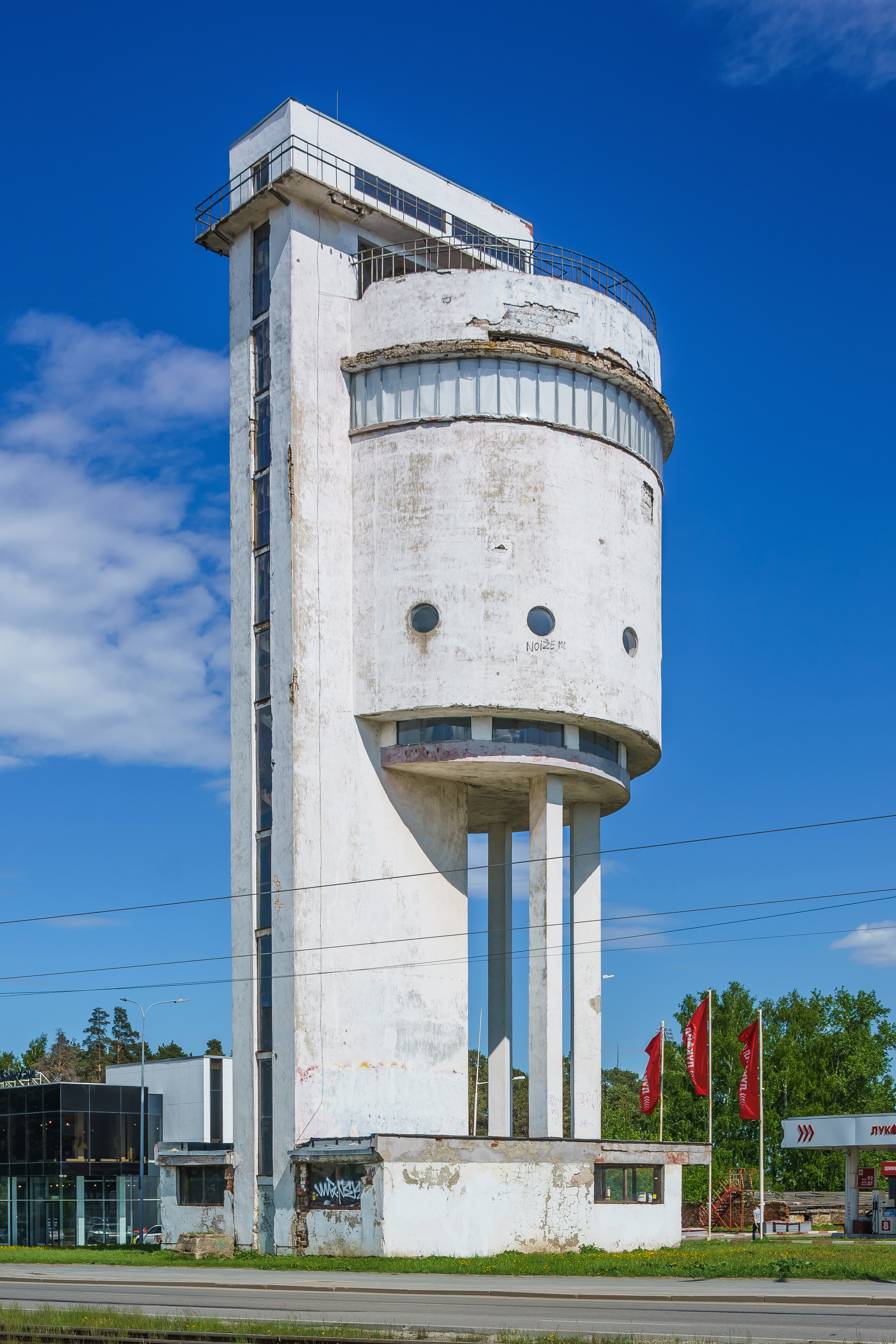
White Tower, Yekaterinburg (1931)

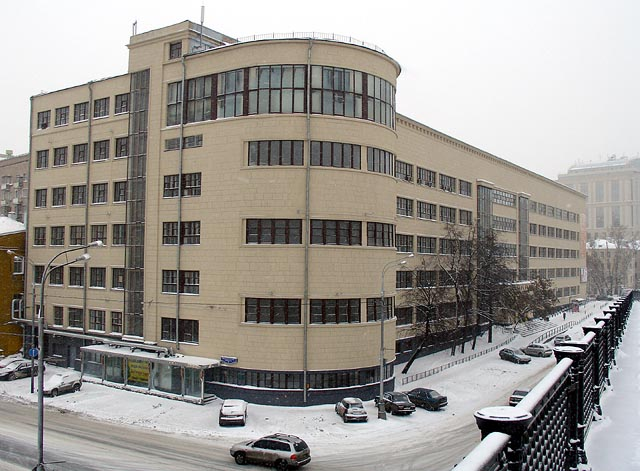
Textile Institute, Moscow (1930–8)

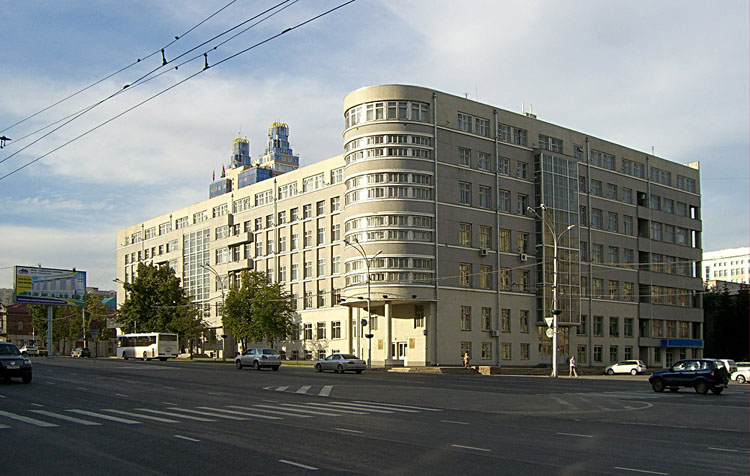
Regional administration building, 1930–1932, Novosibirsk

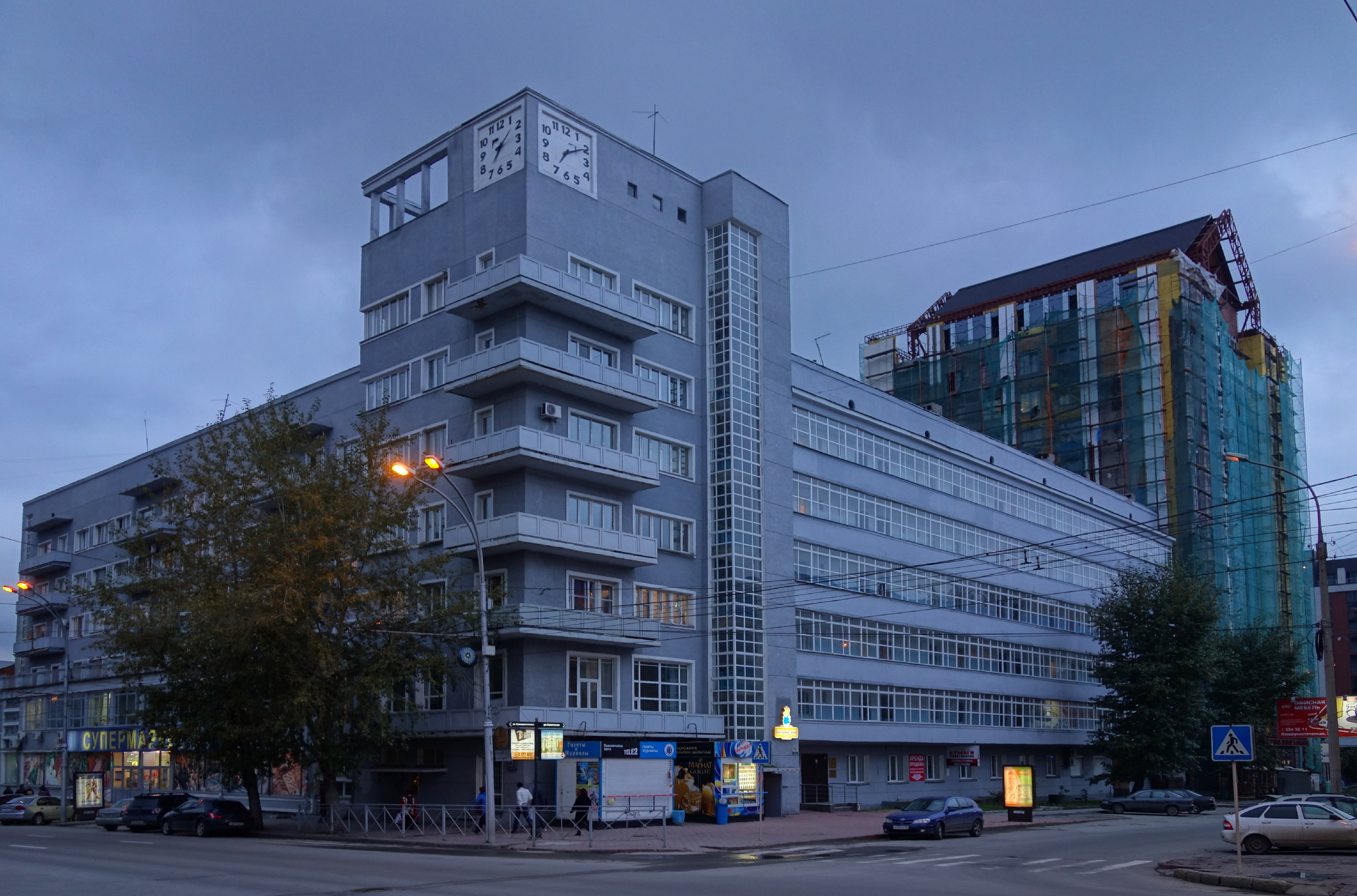
Krasny Prospekt 11, Novosibirsk

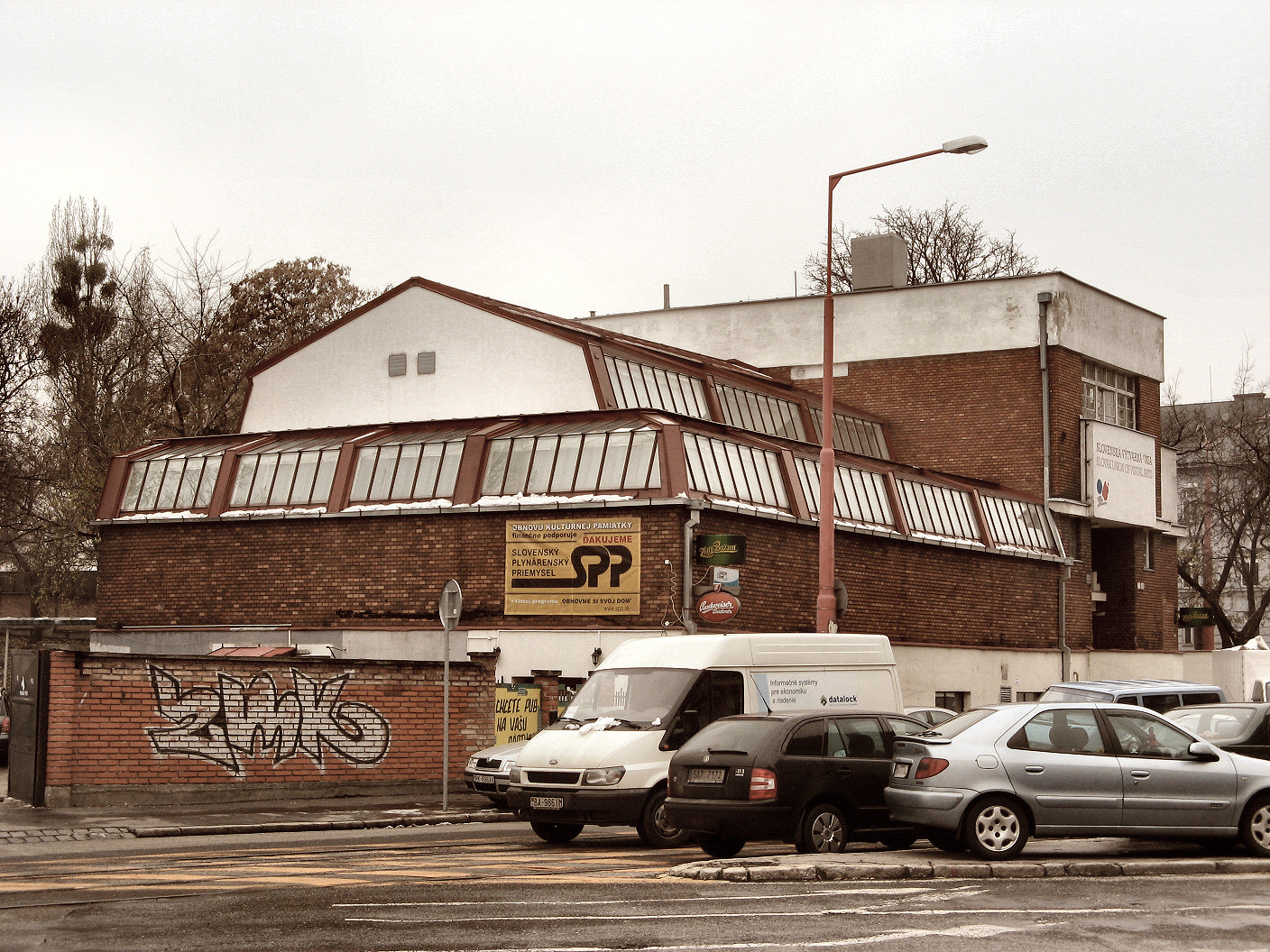
Club of Slovak Artists, Bratislava, Slovakia, 1926

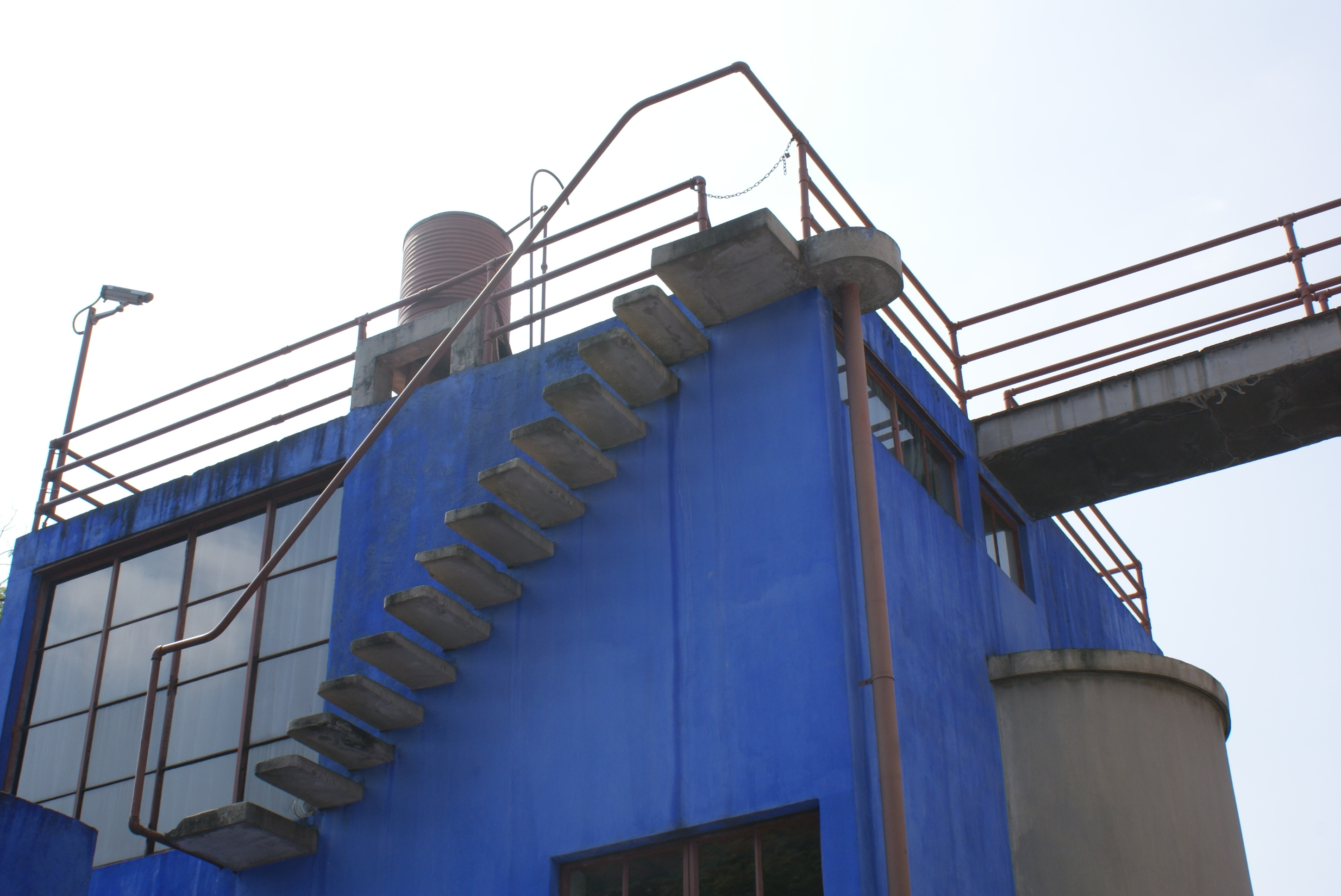
House and studio of Diego Rivera and Frida Kahlo in Mexico City, by Juan O'Gorman, 1932

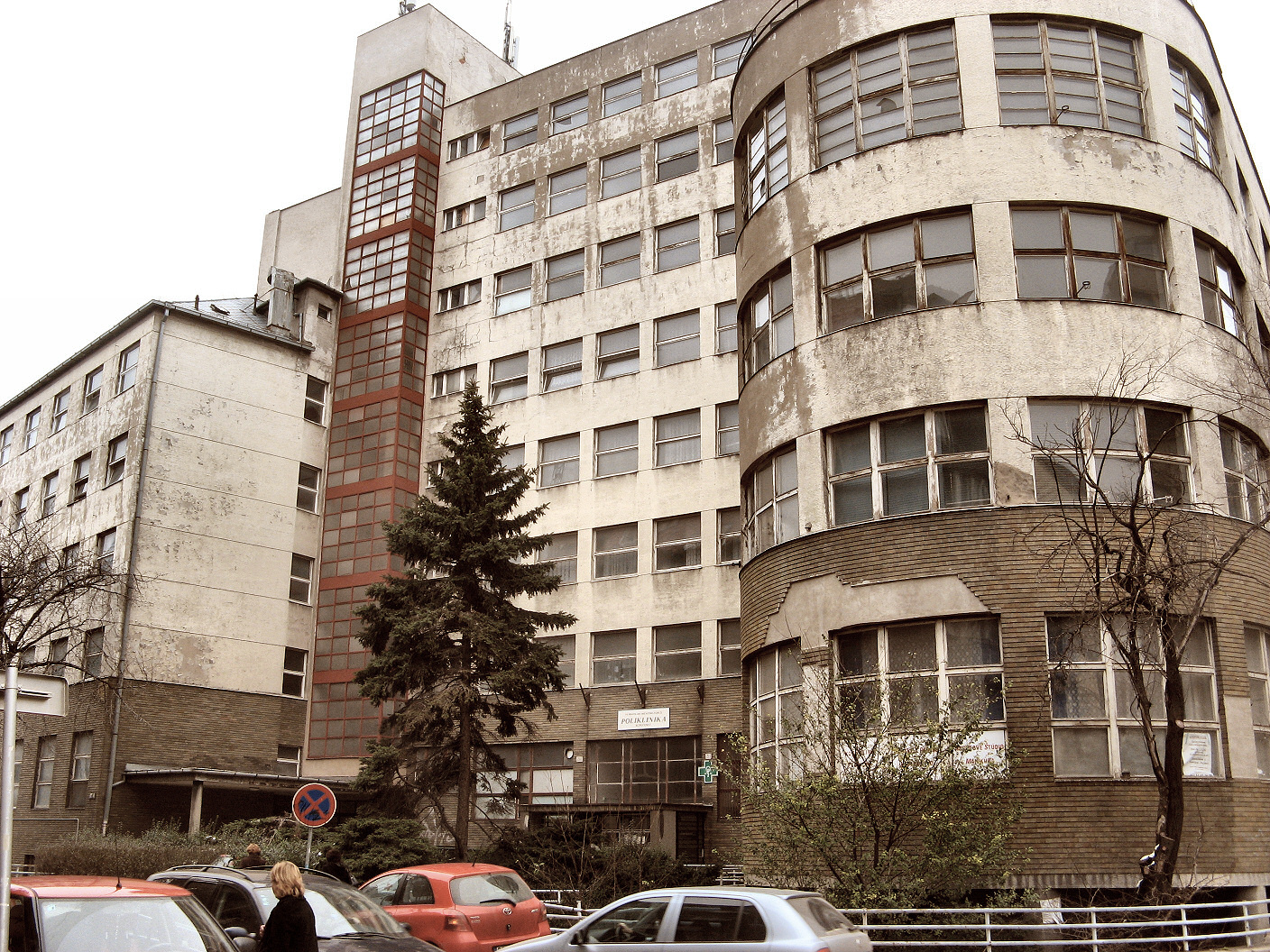
Former hospital Bezručova by Alois Balán and Jiří Grossmann, Bratislava (Slovakia), 1939

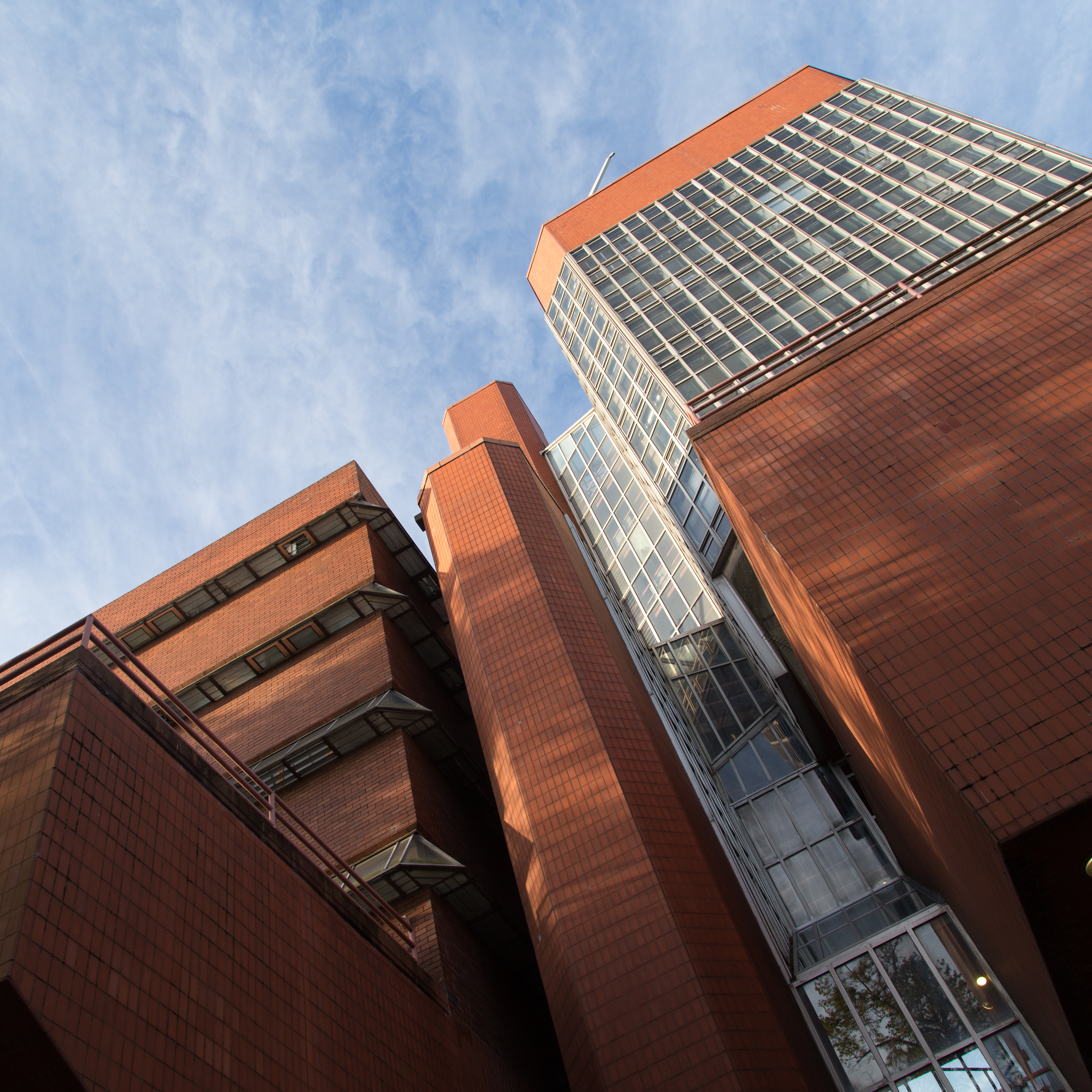
University of Leicester Engineering Building by James Stirling (1963)

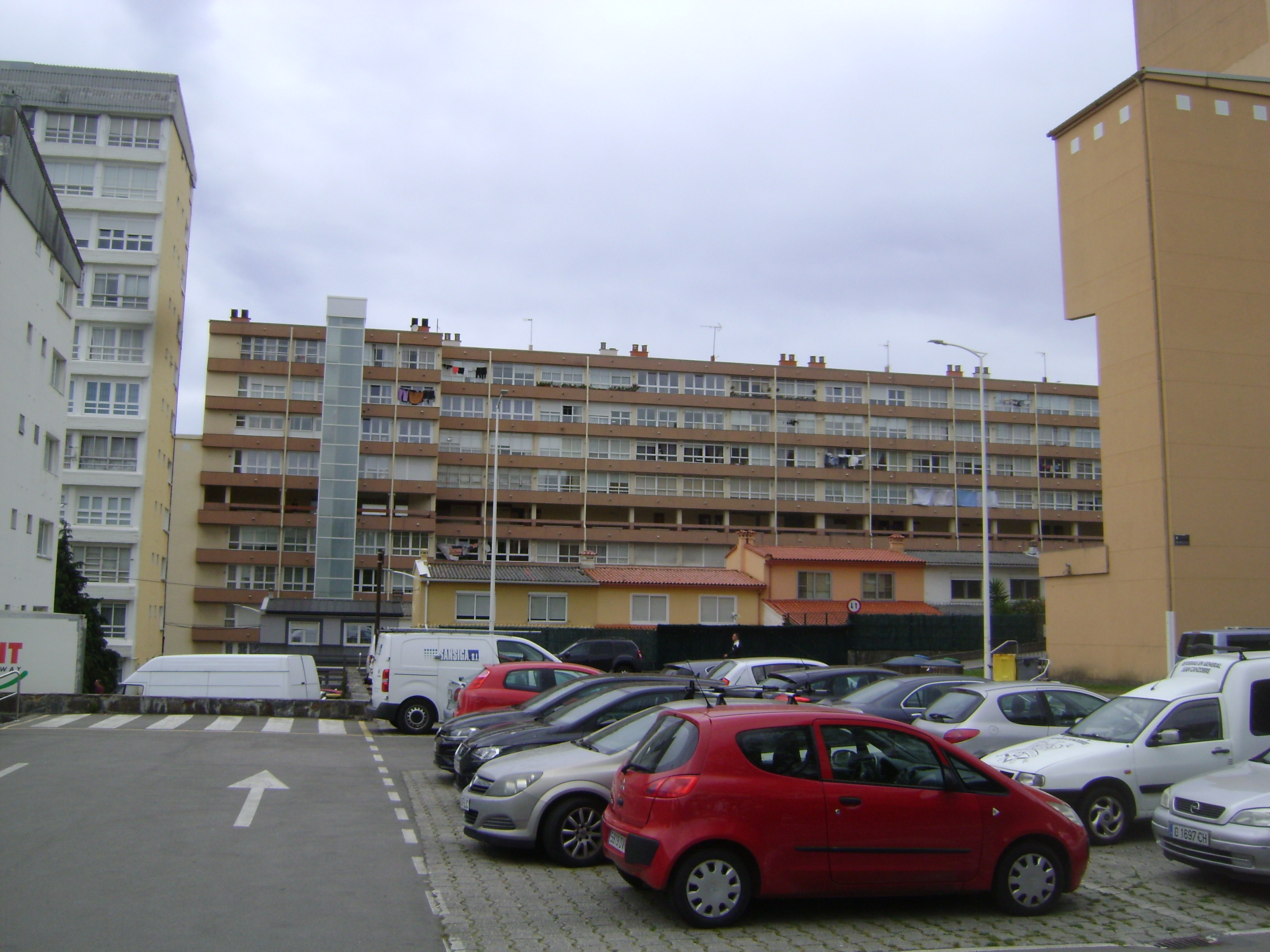
Barrio de las Flores, La Coruña, Galicia, (Spain) (1960s).

== Constructivist buildings and other modernist projects in the former USSR ==
=== Moscow ===
- Mosselprom building (1925) by Nikolai Strukov
- Bakhmetevsky Bus Garage (1927) by Konstantin Melnikov and Vladimir Shukhov
- Kauchuk Factory Club (1929) by Konstantin Melnikov
- Svoboda Factory Club (1929) by Konstantin Melnikov
- Novo-Ryazanskaya Street Garage (1929) by Konstantin Melnikov and Vladimir Shukhov
- Melnikov House (1929) by Konstantin Melnikov
- Narkomfin Building (1930) by Moisei Ginzburg and Ignaty Milinis
- Rusakov Workers' Club (1929) by Konstantin Melnikov
- Zuev Workers' Club (1929) by Ilya Golosov
- Tsentrosoyuz building (1936) by Le Corbusier and Nikolai Kolli
- Gosplan Garage (1936) by Konstantin Melnikov
- ZiL House of Culture (1937) by Vesnin brothers

=== Leningrad (Saint-Petersburg) ===
- Stadium for metal workers "Red Profintern" (1927) by Aleksandr Nikolsky and Lazar Khidekel
- Red Flag Textile Factory (1929) by Erich Mendelsohn
- Bolshoy Dom in Leningrad (1932) by Noi Trotsky, Alexander Gegello and Andrey Ol.
- Kirov District House of Soviets (1935) by Noi Trotsky
- Moscow District House of Soviets (1935) by Igor Fomin, Igor Daugul and Boris Serebrovsky
- 1st House of Lensovet (1934) by Evgeny Levinson and Igor Fomin
- Club for the shipyard workers in Leningrad. by Aleksandr Nikolsky and Lazar Khidekel
- Pumping station. Vasilyeostrovskaya pumping station near the harbor in Leningrad. Construction (1929-1930) by Lazar Khidekel
- Dubrovskaya Thermal Power Plant and Residential settlement Dubrovskaya TPP. Planning and construction of the first in the Soviet Union socialist town – sotsgorodok for workers and specialists (1931–1933) by Lazar Khidekel

=== Minsk ===
- Government House, Minsk (and similar Oblispolkom in Mogilev) by Iosif Langbard

=== Kharkiv ===
- Derzhprom (1928) by Sergey Serafimov, Samuil Kravets and Marc Folger
- House of Projects (1932) by Sergey Serafimov and Maria Sandberg-Serafimova
- KhTZ neighborhood (1930–1931), originally named Sotsmisto Novyi Kharkiv
- Post Office (1929) by Arkady Mordvinov

=== Zaporizhzhia ===
- DniproHES (1932) by Viktor Vesnin and Nikolai Kolli
- Sotsmisto (Sotsgorod) of Zaporizhzhia (1929–1932)

=== Sverdlovsk (Yekaterinburg) ===
- White Tower (1931) by Moisei Reisher
- Builders Club (1929) by Yakov Kornfeld
- House of Printing (1930) by Vladimir Sigov
- 'Gorodok chekistov' (1933) by Ivan Antonov, Veniamin Sokolov and Arseny Tumbasov
- House of Communications (1933) by Kasyan Solomonov

=== Kuybyshev (Samara) ===
- House of Red Army (1930) by Pyotr Scherbachov
- Factory kitchen (1933) by Evgenya Maksimova
- House of Industry (1933) by Vasily Sukhov

=== Novosibirsk ===
- Prombank Dormitory (1927) by I. A. Burlakov
- Polyclinic No. 1 (1928) by P. Shyokin
- Business House (1928) by D. F. Fridman and I. A. Burlakov
- Aeroflot House (1930s)
- State Bank (1930) by Andrey Kryachkov
- Rabochaya Pyatiletka (1930)
- Krayispolkom (Regional Administration Building, 1932) by Boris Gordeev and Sergey Turgenev
- Soyuzzoloto House (1932) by Boris Gordeyev and A. I. Bobrov
- NKVD House (Serebrennikovskaya Street 16) (1932) by Ivan Voronov and Boris Gordeyev
- Novosibirsk Chemical Engineering Technical School (1932) by A. I. Bobrov
- Kuzbassugol Building Complex (1933) by D. A. Ageyev, B. A. Bitkin and Boris Gordeyev
- House of Kraysnabsbyt (1934) by Boris Gordeev and Sergey Turgenev
- Dinamo Residential Complex (1936) by Boris Gordeyev, S. P. Turgenev, V. N. Nikitin
- NKVD House (Serebrennikovskaya Street 23) (1936) by Sergey Turgenev, Ivan Voronov and Boris Gordeyev

=== Non-implemented projects ===
- Tatlin's Tower project by Vladimir Tatlin
- Narkomtiazhprom Project

== Bibliography ==
- Reyner Banham, Theory and Design in the First Machine Age (Architectural Press, 1972)
- Victor Buchli, An Archaeology of Socialism (Berg, 2002)
- Campbell/Lynton (eds.), Art and Revolution (Hayward Gallery, London 1971)
- Catherine Cooke:
  - Architectural Drawings of the Russian Avant-Garde (MOMA, 1990)
  - The Avant Garde (AD magazine, 1988)
  - "Fantasy and Construction: Iakov Chernikhov" (AD magazine, vol. 59 no. 7–8, London 1989)
  - together with Igor Kazus, Soviet Architectural Competitions (Phaidon, 1992)
- Kenneth Frampton, Modern Architecture: a Critical Introduction (Thames & Hudson, 1980)
- Moisei Ginzburg, Style and Epoch (MIT, 1981)
- Selim Khan-Magomedov:
  - Alexander Vesnin and Russian Constructivism (Thames & Hudson 1986)
  - Pioneers of Soviet Architecture (Thames & Hudson 1988), ISBN 978-0-500-34102-5
  - 100 Masterpieces of Soviet Avant-garde Architecture Russian Academy of Architecture. M., Editorial URSS, 2005
  - Lazar Khidekel (Creators of Russian Classical Avant-garde series) 2008 (Russian), 2010 (English)
- Rem Koolhaas, "The Story of the Pool" (1977) included in Delirious New York (Monacelli Press, 1997), ISBN 978-1-885254-00-9
- El Lissitzky, The Reconstruction of Architecture in the Soviet Union (Vienna, 1930)
- Karl Schlögel, Moscow (Reaktion, 2005)
- Karel Teige, The Minimum Dwelling (MIT, 2002)
