= 1927 in architecture =

The year 1927 in architecture involved some significant architectural events and new buildings.

== Events ==
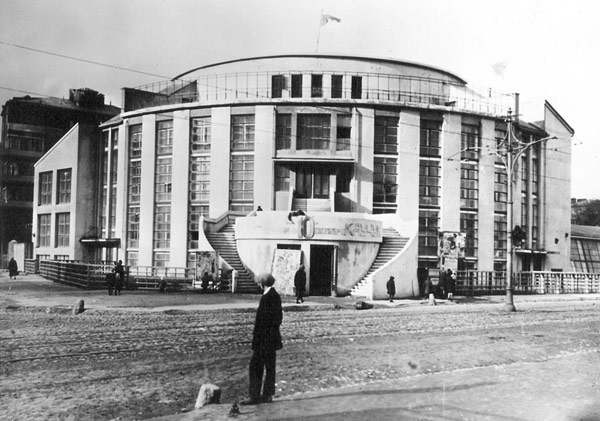
Melnikov stands in front of his completed Kauchuk Factory Club

- July 11 – 1927 Jericho earthquake destroys or damages many mosques and other buildings in the area of Mandatory Palestine.
- The opening of the Bakhmetevsky Bus Garage in Moscow, designed by Konstantin Melnikov and Vladimir Shukhov, marks the beginning of Melnikov's "golden season", designing over ten buildings in one year, including extant Kauchuk Factory Club, Rusakov Workers' Club, Svoboda Factory Club and his own residence in Moscow. These buildings are completed in 1928–1929.
- The 15th century Chapelle de St. Martin de Seyssuel is relocated from Chasse-sur-Rhône to Long Island, New York.
- The first photo-mural is used to decorate a living room. It is soon embraced by architectural designers, becoming common in the 1930s.

== Buildings and structures ==
=== Buildings opened ===
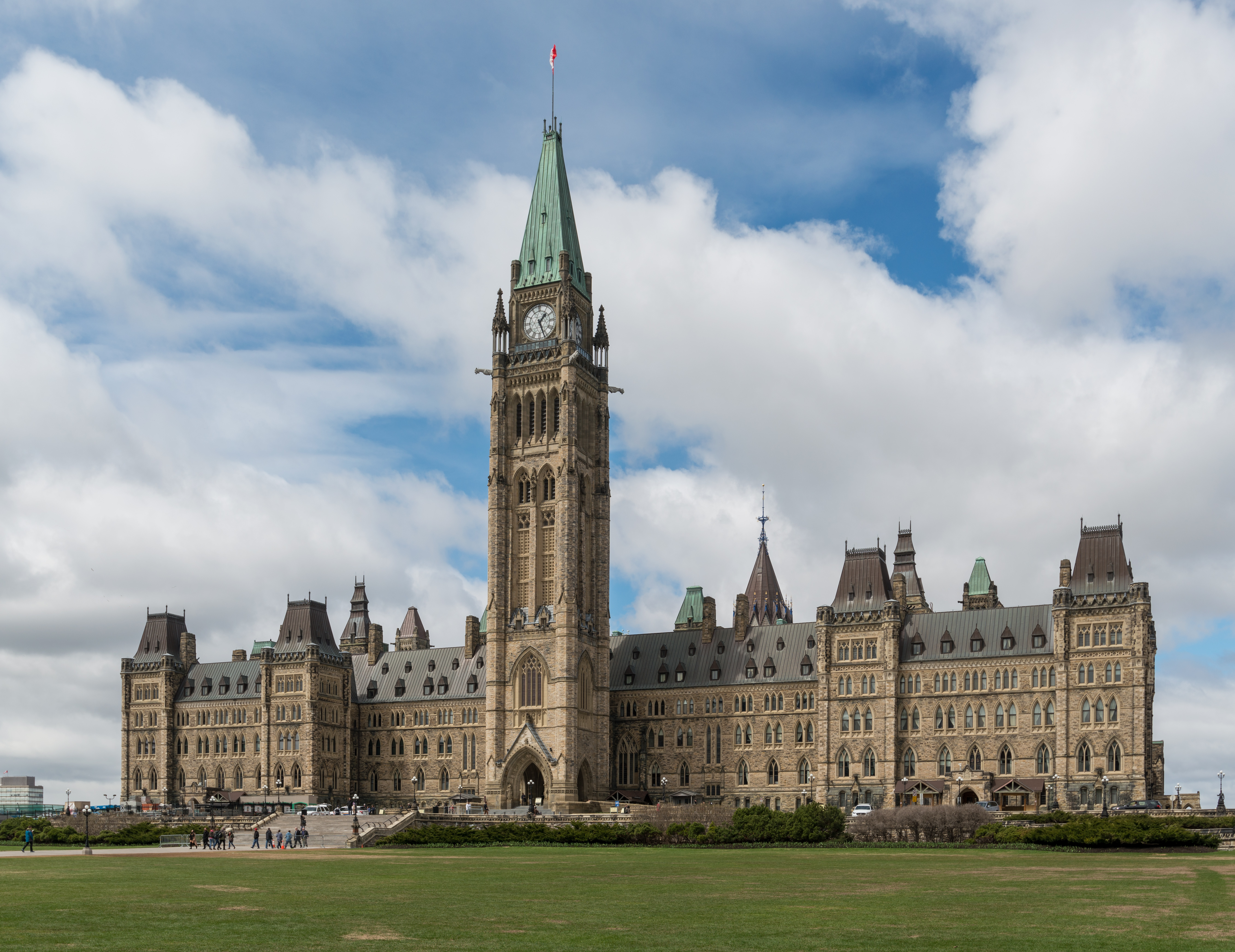
Centre Block, the main building of the Parliament of Canada on Parliament Hill in Ottawa, Canada

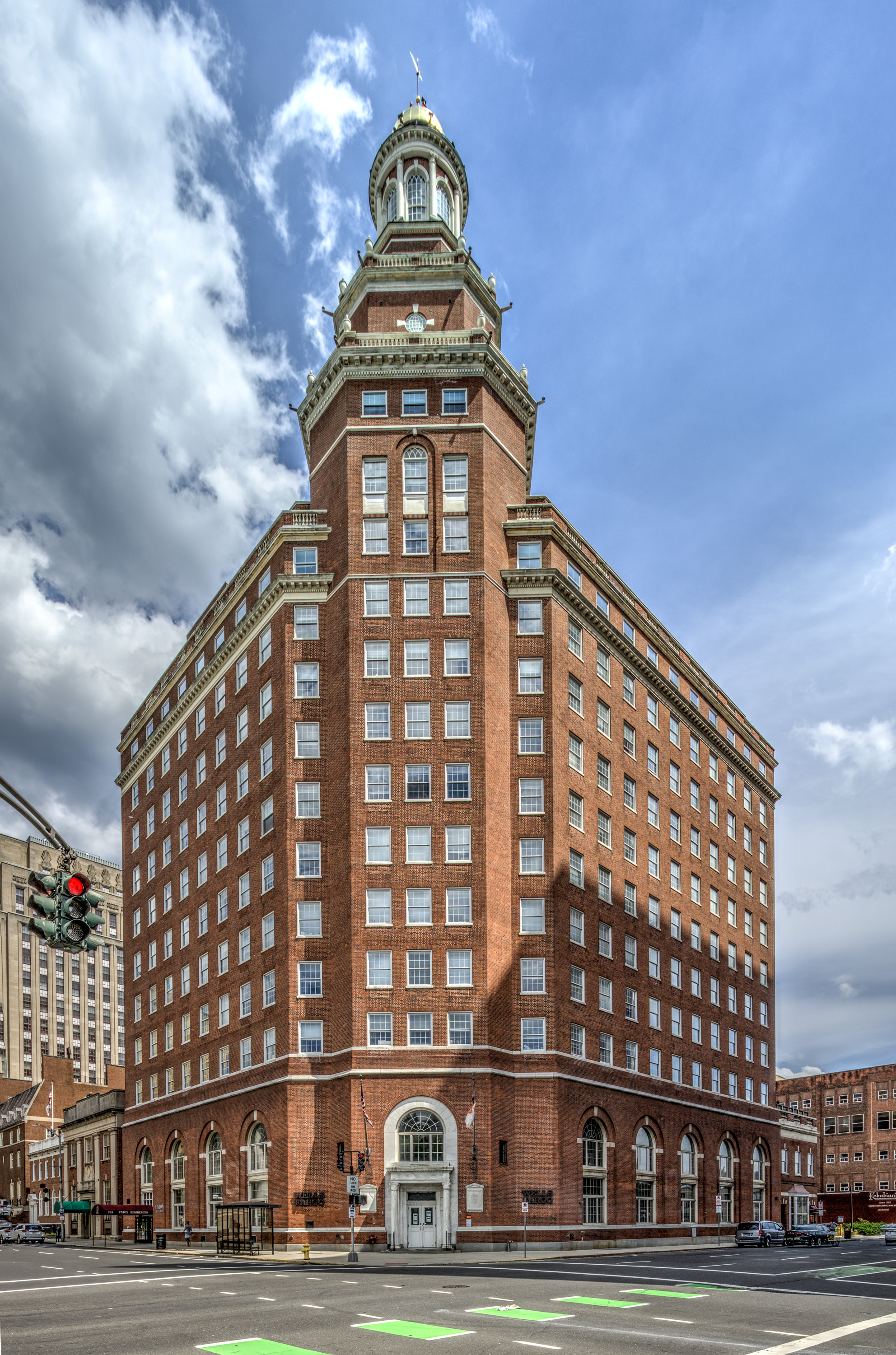
Union and New Haven Trust Building, New Haven, Connecticut

- January – Temepara Tapu o Ihoa (Holy Temple of Jehovah), Rātana Pā, New Zealand, is privately opened.
- July 1 – Centre Block, the main building of the Parliament of Canada on Parliament Hill in Ottawa, rebuilt after a fire in 1916 to a design by John A. Pearson and Jean Omer Marchand, is officially opened.
- July 6 – Central Fire Station in Leicester, England, designed by Albert E. and Tom Sawday, is officially opened.
- July 14 – Scottish National War Memorial at Edinburgh Castle, designed by Robert Lorimer, is opened.
- July 24 – Menin Gate Memorial to the Missing at Ypres, Belgium, designed by Sir Reginald Blomfield, is unveiled.
- October 9 – Norwich War Memorial in England, designed by Sir Edwin Lutyens, is unveiled.
- October 24 – Fred F. French Building in Midtown Manhattan, New York City, designed by H. Douglas Ives with Sloan & Robertson, is opened.

=== Buildings completed ===
- Weissenhof Estate in Stuttgart, Germany, designed by a team led by Ludwig Mies van der Rohe.
- Double house in Brno, designed by Otto Eisler.
- 5 villas in rue Mallet-Stevens, Paris, designed by Robert Mallet-Stevens.
- The rebuilt Quadrant in Regent Street, London, England.
- The Shrine of Remembrance in Melbourne, Australia.
- The Antoniuskirche (Basel) in Switzerland, designed by Karl Moser.
- The Art Deco LeVeque Tower, designed by C. Howard Crane and John Gill & Sons, in Columbus, Ohio, United States. At 555.5 feet (169.3 meters) tall, it is just slightly higher than the Washington Monument.
- The Ahwahnee Hotel in Yosemite National Park, California, designed by Gilbert Stanley Underwood.
- Union and New Haven Trust Building, New Haven, Connecticut, designed by Cross & Cross.

== Awards ==
- AIA Gold Medal – Howard Van Doren Shaw.
- RIBA Royal Gold Medal – Herbert Baker.

== Births ==
- January 30 – Roberto Gottardi, Italian architect (died 2017)
- March 3 – Christian Menn, bridge architect (died 2018)
- June 18 – Ruth Rivera Marín, Mexican architect (died 1969)
- July 6 – Anton Alberts, Dutch architect best known for the ING Bank, Amsterdam (died 1999)
- August 26 – B. V. Doshi, Indian architect (died 2023)
- December 4 – Gae Aulenti, Italian architect, interior and lighting designer (died 2012)

== Deaths ==
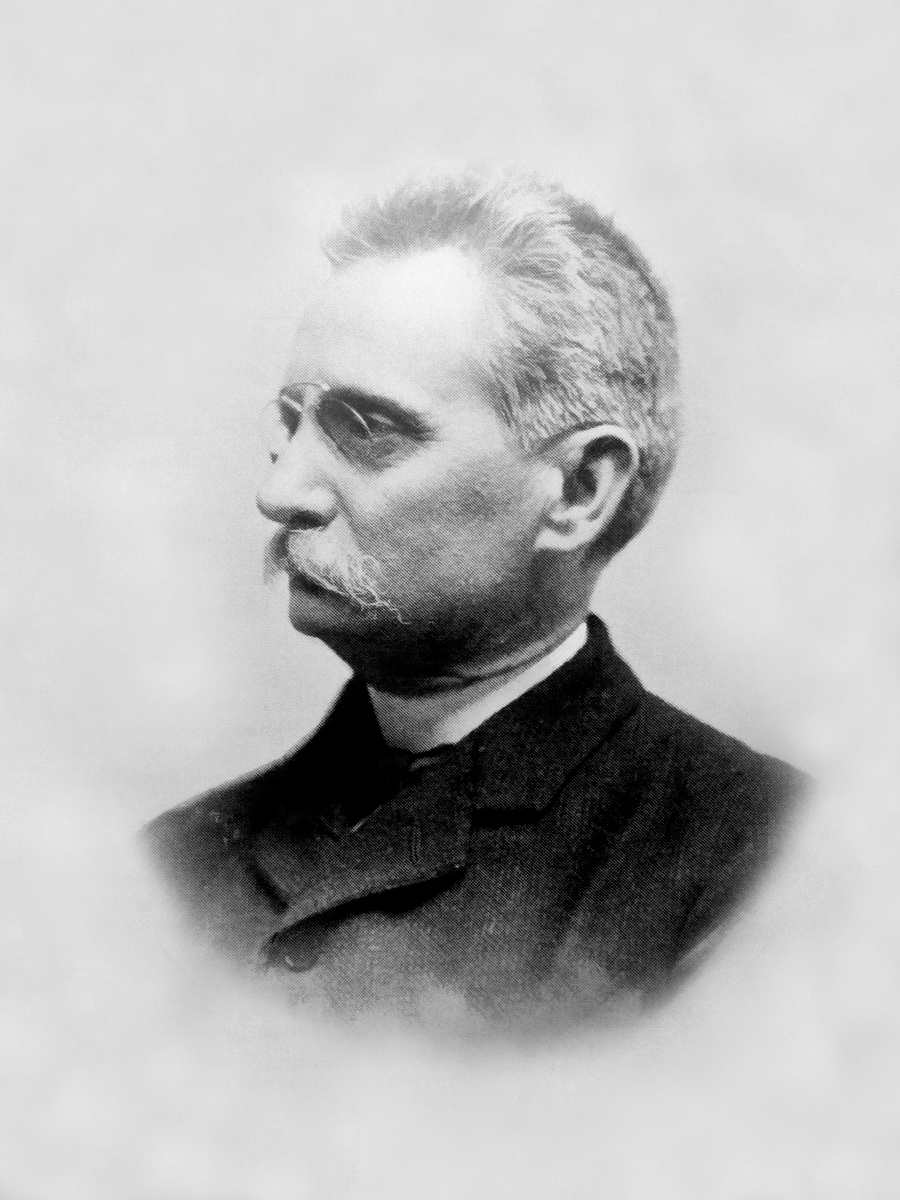
Lluís Domènech i Montaner

- January 3 – Antonio Rivas Mercado, Mexican architect (born 1853)
- January 25 – Mark Judge, British architect and engineer (born 1847)
- March 12 – John Beavor-Webb, Irish-born American naval architect (born 1849)
- June 23 – Colonel Sir Robert William Edis, English architect and interior decorator (born 1839)
- July 13 – Mimar Kemaleddin Bey, Turkish architect (born 1870; cerebral hemorrhage)
- September 9 – Henry Ward, British architect (born 1852)
- October 29 – Hermann Muthesius, German architect and writer on architecture (born 1861)
- December 26 – Joseph Schwartz, American architect (born 1858)
- December 27 – Lluís Domènech i Montaner, Catalan Spanish architect (born 1850)
