= Deaths in August 1999 =

The following is a list of notable deaths in August 1999.

Entries for each day are listed alphabetically by surname. A typical entry lists information in the following sequence:

- Name, age, country of citizenship at birth, subsequent country of citizenship (if applicable), reason for notability, cause of death (if known), and reference.

== August 1999 ==
=== 1 ===
- Rudy Burckhardt, 85, Swiss-American filmmaker and photographer, suicide by drowning.
- Francisco Cascante, 71, Cuban Olympic gymnast (1952).
- Nirad C. Chaudhuri, 101, Indian English-language writer.
- Dudley Coulson, 70, British-Kenyan Olympic field hockey player (1956).
- Robert S. Gawthrop III, 56, American district judge (United States District Court for the Eastern District of Pennsylvania).
- Tommy Hinnershitz, 87, American race car driver.
- Kalyan Kumar, 71, Indian film actor and producer.
- Naseer Malik, 49, Pakistani cricket player.
- Paris Pişmiş, 88, Armenian-Mexican astronomer.
- İrfan Özaydınlı, 75, Turkish soldier and politician.

=== 2 ===
- Alberto Gironella, 69, Mexican painter.
- Gregorio Cárdenas Hernández, Mexican serial killer.
- Sunthorn Kongsompong, 68, Thai military commander and politician, Prime Minister (1991–1992), lung cancer.
- Alf Miller, 82, English football player and coach.
- Willie Morris, 64, American writer and editor.
- Bernhard Quandt, 96, German politician.
- Jim Slaughter, 71, American basketball player (Baltimore Bullets).
- Peter Vanneck, 77, British Royal Navy officer, fighter pilot and politician.

=== 3 ===
- Abd al-Wahhab Al-Bayati, 72, Iraqi poet.
- Rodney Ansell, 44, Australian cattle grazier, buffalo hunter and inspiration for Crocodile Dundee, killed in a police shootout.
- Byron Farwell, 78, American military historian, biographer, and politician.
- Myung Jae-nam, 61, Korean Hapkido practitioner, stomach cancer.
- Dick Latvala, 56, American musician and tape archivist for rock band the Grateful Dead.
- Ramón Lavín, 37, Spanish Olympic swimmer (1980).
- Ramón Martínez, 73, Spanish fencer and Olympian (1960).
- Bob Mollohan, 89, American politician, member of the United States House of Representatives (1953-1957, 1969-1983).
- Yitzhak Rafael, 85, Israeli politician.
- Leroy Vinnegar, 71, American jazz bassist, heart attack.
- Roy Wiggins, 73, American steel guitarist.

=== 4 ===
- Akhlaq Ahmed, 49, Pakistani playback singer, blood cancer.
- Willem Jens, 90, Dutch Olympic rower (1936).
- Liselott Linsenhoff, 71, German equestrian and Olympic champion (1956, 1968, 1972).
- Victor Mature, 86, American film actor (One Million B.C., Samson and Delilah, Kiss of Death), leukemia.
- Lucrecia Reyes-Urtula, 70, Filipina choreographer, theater director and author.
- Leo Sanders, 85, American baseball player.
- Derrick Shepard, 35, American gridiron football player (Washington Redskins, New Orleans Saints, Dallas Cowboys), heart attack.
- Carl Toms, 72, British set and costume designer, emphysema.

=== 5 ===
- Charles Anthony Boyd, 39, American serial killer.
- Friedhelm Dick, 55, German footballer.
- James Failla, 80, American mobster (Gambino crime family).
- Henry Holloway, 68, Australian rugby player and coach.
- John Kacere, 79, American visual artist.
- David Munro, 55, English documentary filmmaker, cancer.
- Rimma Zhukova, 74, Soviet and Russian speed skater.

=== 6 ===
- Mihai Băcescu, 91, Romanian zoologist.
- Ilse Pausin, 80, Austrian pair skater and Olympic medalist (1936).
- Kalpnath Rai, 58, Indian politician, heart attack.
- Rita Sakellariou, 64, Greek singer, cancer.
- Muhammad Shariff, 78, Pakistani Army general.
- Claudette Sorel, 66, American pianist and educator, cancer.
- Cec Waters, 77, Australian rugby league footballer.
- Jerry Yulsman, 75, American novelist and a photographer, lung cancer.

=== 7 ===
- Wally Albright, 73, American former child actor.
- Jonathan Boyd, 54, Australian professional wrestler, heart attack.
- Herbert Hagen, 85, German SS-Sturmbannführer and war criminal during World War II.
- Mustafa Hukić, 48, Bosnian footballer.
- Brion James, 54, American actor (Blade Runner, The Fifth Element, 48 Hrs.), heart attack.
- J. Andrew Keith, 40, American role-playing game designer.
- Harry Litwack, 91, American college basketball coach (Temple Owls).
- Desmond Marquette, 90, American film editor.
- Kazuo Miyagawa, 91, Japanese cinematographer.
- Ted Natt, 58, American newspaper publisher (The Daily News), helicopter crash.
- Tsou Tang, 80, Chinese-American political scientist.
- John Van Ryn, 94, American tennis player.

=== 8 ===
- Virginia Allan, 82, American educator and women's employment advocate.
- Sonny Cullen, 65, Irish Olympic cyclist (1960).
- Yolanda Sofia Vargas Pereira Dulché, 73, Mexican writer.
- Paavo Rintala, 68, Finnish novelist and theologian.
- Dora Schaul, 85, German resistance activist during World War II.
- Harry Walker, 82, American baseball player, manager and coach.

=== 9 ===
- Ira Baldwin, 103, American academic and administrator.
- John Hallett, 81, Australian politician.
- Cliff Hanley, 76, Scottish journalist, novelist, playwright and broadcaster .
- William Arthur Irwin, 101, Canadian journalist and diplomat, asthma.
- Georg Marischka, 77, Austrian actor, screenwriter, and film producer.
- John O'Neill, 56, Australian rugby player, cancer.
- Helen Rollason, 43, British sports journalist and television presenter, colorectal cancer.
- Jackie Sato, 41, professional wrestler from Yokohama, Japan, stomach cancer.
- Riley Smith, 88, American football player (Boston/Washington Redskins).
- Roger Stott, 56, Britishpolitician, liver cancer.
- Willard Swihart, 84, American basketball player.
- Abraham H. Taub, 88, American mathematician and physicist.
- Yury Volyntsev, 67, Soviet and Russian film and theater actor.

=== 10 ===
- Ernesto Melo Antunes, 65, Portuguese military officer.
- Ernst Bader, 85, German actor, composer and songwriter (lyricist).
- Giuseppe Delfino, 77, Italian fencer and Olympic champion (1952, 1956, 1960, 1964).
- Lenko Grčić, 74, Croatian football player and coach.
- Jens Hoyer Hansen, 59, Danish-born New Zealand jeweller, cancer.
- Jennifer Paterson, 71, British chef and television personality (Two Fat Ladies), lung cancer.
- Anthony Stanislas Radziwill, 40, American television executive and filmmaker, cancer.
- Kari Suomalainen, 78, Finnish political cartoonist.
- Baldev Upadhyaya, 99, Indian literary historian, essayist and critic.

=== 11 ===
- Lajos Baranyai, 60, Hungarian Olympic boxer (1960).
- Dickie Davis, 77, English footballer.
- Robert Dorfmann, 87, French film producer.
- James Otto Earhart, 56, American murderer, execution by lethal injection.
- Paul Gibson, 74, American football player (Buffalo Bills).
- Robert Thomas Jones, 89, American engineer.
- Ernst Kaether, 95, German Wehrmacht general during World War II.
- Luz Machado, 83, Venezuelan political activist, journalist and poet.
- Ramnath Parkar, 52, Indian cricket player.
- Mimi Pollak, 96, Swedish actress and theatre director.
- Byron Randall, 80, American West Coast artist, emphysema.
- Tommy Ridgley, 73, American R&B singer and bandleader, lung cancer.
- Henk Chin A Sen, 65, Surinamese politician.
- A. G. Ram Singh, 89, Indian first-class cricket player.

=== 12 ===
- Pavel Arsyonov, 63, Soviet and Russian film actor, screenwriter and film director.
- Jean Drapeau, 83, Canadian lawyer and politician.
- Ross Elliott, 82, American television and film character actor, cancer.
- Albert E. Green, 86, British applied mathematician and research scientist.
- John Rigby Hale, 75, British historian.
- Josh Johnson, 85, American baseball player.
- Wilfrid Kalaugher, 94, New Zealand athlete, scholar, and Olympian (1928).
- Georges Roux, 84, French writer and historian.
- Bob Wilson, 83, American politician, member of the United States House of Representatives (1953-1981).
- Martin Wong, 53, Chinese-American painter, AIDS related illness.
- Can Yücel, 72, Turkish poet, throat cancer.

=== 13 ===
- Susana Ferrari Billinghurst, 85, Argentine aviator.
- Ignatz Bubis, 72, German Jewish leader.
- Jaime Garzón Forero, 38, Colombian comedian, journalist, politician, and peace activist, shot.
- John Geering, 58, British cartoonist.
- Frederick Hart, 55, American sculptor, cancer.
- Nathaniel Kleitman, 104, American physiologist and sleep researcher.
- Maria Krüger, 94, Polish children's literature writer and journalist.
- Jean-Claude Lefebvre, 62, French basketball player.
- Argentina Díaz Lozano, 86, Honduran journalist and novelist.
- Sulo Nurmela, 91, Finnish cross-country skier and Olympic champion (1936).
- Herberto Sales, 81, Brazilian journalist and writer.

=== 14 ===
- Evelyn Adams, 75, American baseball player (AAGPBL).
- Lane Kirkland, 77, American labor union leader, cancer.
- Philip Klutznick, 92, American administrator, Secretary of Commerce (1980–1981), Alzheimer's disease.
- Pat Mullin, 81, American baseball player (Detroit Tigers).
- John Pingel, 82, American football player (Detroit Lions).
- Pee Wee Reese, 81, American baseball player (Brooklyn Dodgers) and member of the MLB Hall of Fame, lung cancer.
- Lidia Selkregg, Italian geologist.

=== 15 ===
- Patricia Beer, 79, English poet and critic.
- Hugh Casson, 89, English architect, interior designer, artist and writer.
- Frank Castle, 75, English sprint athlete and rugby player.
- Paddy Devlin, 74, Irish social democrat, labour and civil rights activist.
- Greek George, 86, Catcher in Major League Baseball.
- Stan Kemp, 75, Canadian ice hockey player (Toronto Maple Leafs).
- Vladimir Loshchilov, 67, Soviet Olympic shot putter (1956).
- Mark McPhee, 35, Australian cricketer, traffic collision.
- Olga Orozco, 79, Argentine poet, cardiovascular disease.
- Pierre Ranzoni, 78, French footballer
- Celestine Sibley, 85, American newspaper reporter.

=== 16 ===
- Anton Alberts, 72, Dutch architect.
- David W. Allen, 54, American film and television stop motion animator, cancer.
- Ron Aspinall, 80, English cricket player.
- Carlos Cachaça, 97, Brazilian samba songwriter.
- Roy Edwards, 62, Canadian ice hockey player (Detroit Red Wings, Pittsburgh Penguins).
- Nancy Guild, 73, American film actress, emphysema.
- Regina Kent, 31, Hong Kong actress, brain cancer.
- Rose Leon, 85, Jamaican businesswoman and politician, homicide.
- Bernard Parrish, 80, American politician.
- Hédard Robichaud, 87, Canadian politician.
- Rudolf Sremec, 89, Yugoslav and Croatian film director.

=== 17 ===
- Randy Heflin, 80, American baseball player (Boston Red Sox).
- Charles Samuel Joelson, 83, American lawyer and politician, member of the United States House of Representatives (1961-1969).
- Reiner Klimke, 63, German equestrian and Olympic champion (1960, 1964, 1968, 1976, 1984, 1988), heart attack.
- Henri Paret, 69, French racing cyclist.
- Bill Tyquin, 80, Australian rugby player.

=== 18 ===
- Alfred Bickel, 81, Swiss football player and coach.
- Albert Frazier, 84, American football and baseball coach.
- Alf Kirchen, 85, English football player.
- Hanoch Levin, 55, Israeli dramatist, author and poet, heart attack.

=== 19 ===
- Giuseppe Beviacqua, 84, Italian long-distance runner and Olympian (1936).
- Irene Falcón, 91, Spanish journalist, feminist and activist, respiratory condition.
- Dee Fondy, 74, American baseball player (Chicago Cubs, Pittsburgh Pirates, Cincinnati Reds).
- Ian Orr-Ewing, Baron Orr-Ewing, 87, British politician.
- Kim Perrot, 32, American basketball player (Houston Comets), lung cancer.
- Arthur Pinajian, 85, Armenian-American comic book writer.
- Rodrigo Riera, 75, Venezuelan guitarist and composer.
- Shaukat Hussain Rizvi, 85, Pakistani actor, film producer and director.

=== 20 ===
- Arthur Cain, 78, British evolutionary biologist and ecologist.
- Carlos Couto, 69, Brazilian Olympic fencer (1968).
- Albert von Einsiedel, 82, Filipino sports shooter and Olympian (1948).
- Bob Gallion, 75, American country music singer.
- Héctor García, 73, Uruguayan Olympic basketball player (1948, 1952, 1956).
- Joseph Hasenfus, 86, American Olympic canoeist (1936).
- Josef Herink, 83, Czech medical doctor and mycologist.
- Bobby Sheehan, 31, American musician and songwriter, accidental overdose.
- Josane Sigart, 90, Belgian tennis player.
- Abdus Salam Talukder, 62, Bangladeshi politician and lawyer.

=== 21 ===
- Leo Castelli, 91, Italian-American art dealer.
- Venya D'rkin, 29, Russian language bard, cancer.
- Faisal bin Fahd, 54/55, Saudi prince, heart attack.
- Cilly Feindt, 90, German circus performer and stage and film actress.
- Nap Gulley, 74, American baseball player.
- Jimmy Roe, 90, American soccer player.
- Sigfús Sigurðsson, 77, Icelandic Olympic athlete (1948).
- Edward Slowinski, 76, Canadian ice hockey player (New York Rangers).
- Hans von Herwarth, 95, German diplomat.
- Yevgeni Yeliseyev, 90, Soviet and Russian football player and coach.

=== 22 ===
- Aleksandr Demyanenko, 62, Russian film and theater actor, heart attack.
- Richard Cameron Freeman, 72, American district judge (United States District Court for the Northern District of Georgia).
- Yann Goulet, 85, French sculptor.
- Marguerite Muni, 70, French actress.
- Hide Hyodo Shimizu, 91, Japanese-Canadian educator and activist.

=== 23 ===
- Carlos Iturri, 82, Peruvian Olympic fencer (1948).
- Charles Lundmark, 72, American Olympic canoeist (1960).
- Martha Rountree, 87, American pioneering broadcast journalist.
- Ray F. Smith, 80, American agronomist and entomologist.
- Frank Tredrea, 79, New Zealand racing cyclist.
- Norman Wexler, 73, American screenwriter (Saturday Night Fever, Serpico, Raw Deal), heart attack.
- James White, 71, Northern Irish author of science fiction short stories and novels, stroke.

=== 24 ===
- Georges Boulogne, 82, French football player and manager.
- Roberto Bussinello, 71, Italian racing driver.
- Warren Covington, 78, American big band trombonist.
- Mary Jane Croft, 83, American actress (The Adventures of Ozzie & Harriet, I Love Lucy, Our Miss Brooks).
- Jo Gullett, 84, Australian soldier, politician, diplomat and journalist.
- Alexandre Lagoya, 70, French classical guitarist.
- William Kaye Lamb, 95, Canadian historian, archivist and librarian.
- Fran Matthews, 82, American baseball player.
- Lonnie Summers, 84, American baseball player.

=== 25 ===
- Rob Fisher, 42, British songwriter and musician (Naked Eyes, Climie Fisher), colorectal cancer.
- Dave Holmes, 75, American football player and coach, heart attack.
- George Petty-Fitzmaurice, 8th Marquess of Lansdowne, 86, British peer and politician.
- George Sugarman, 87, American painter and sculptor.
- Georg Thomalla, 84, German actor.
- Jack Whent, 79, English soccer player.

=== 26 ===
- Louise Bellocq, 90, French writer, poet, and woman of letters.
- Tinus van Gelder, 87, Dutch Olympic cyclist (1948).
- Tonči Gulin, 61, Croatian football player.
- Elena Murgoci, 39, Romanian long-distance runner and Olympian (1992), stabbed.
- Raymond Vernon, 85, American economist, cancer.

=== 27 ===
- Elizabeth Blackbourn, English table tennis player.
- Harold Jack Bloom, 75, American television producer and screenwriter, cancer.
- Hélder Câmara, 90, Brazilian Roman Catholic archbishop, heart attack.
- Nyoshul Khenpo Jamyang Dorje, 67, Tibetan lama.
- Bai Guang, 78, Chinese actress and singer, colon cancer.
- Enzo Martinelli, 87, Italian mathematician.
- Louise Thompson Patterson, 97, American social activist and college professor.
- Ralph Riley, 74, British geneticist.

=== 28 ===
- Rafael Manzanares Aguilar, 81, Honduran folklorist, author, and musical composer.
- Stephen Akinmurele, 21, British suspected serial killer, suicide by hanging.
- Harvie M. Conn, 66, Canadian missionary.
- Johnny Gerlach, 82, American Major League Baseball player (Chicago White Sox).
- Dave Pope, 78, American baseball player (Cleveland Indians, Baltimore Orioles).

=== 29 ===
- Ann Baker, 84, American jazz singer.
- Jaime Fields, 29, American gridiron football player (Kansas City Chiefs), traffic collision.
- Paul Horiuchi, 93, American painter and collagist, Alzheimer's disease.
- Claudio Lezcano, 69, Paraguayan football player.
- Willy Rathnov, 62, Danish film actor, neck cancer.
- Emeline Hill Richardson, 89, American classical archaeologist and Etruscan scholar.
- Luca Sportelli, 72, Italian actor.

=== 30 ===
- Abdullah Al-Baradouni, 70, Yemeni writer, poet and critic.
- Reindert Brasser, 86, Dutch athlete and Olympian (1936).
- Hans Heinrich Eggebrecht, 80, German musicologist and academic.
- George Golding, 93, Australian runner, hurdler, and Olympian (1932).
- Warren Huston, 85, American baseball player (Philadelphia Athletics, Boston Braves).
- Kristapor Ivanyan, 78, Soviet and Armenian lieutenant general.
- Jean-Baptiste Maquet, 77, Belgian Olympic fencer (1952).
- William A. Niering, 75, American botanist.
- Raymond Poïvet, 89, French cartoonist.
- Fritz Shurmur, 67, American football coach, liver cancer.
- Edward Stewart, 84, American set decorator (All That Jazz, The Wiz, Network), Oscar winner (1980).
- István Timár-Geng, 76, Hungarian Olympic basketball player (1948).

=== 31 ===
- Marguerite Chapman, 81, American actress.
- Ed Kea, 51, Dutch-born Canadian ice hockey player (Atlanta Flames, St. Louis Blues), drowned.
- Sylvia Potts, 55, New Zealand middle-distance athlete and Olympian (1968), cancer.
- Henry Earl Singleton, 82, American electrical engineer and business executive.
- Irina Yanina, 32, Russian medical sergeant.
