= Svoboda Factory Club =

Avant-garde building in Russia

Coordinates: 55°48′2″N 37°34′53″E

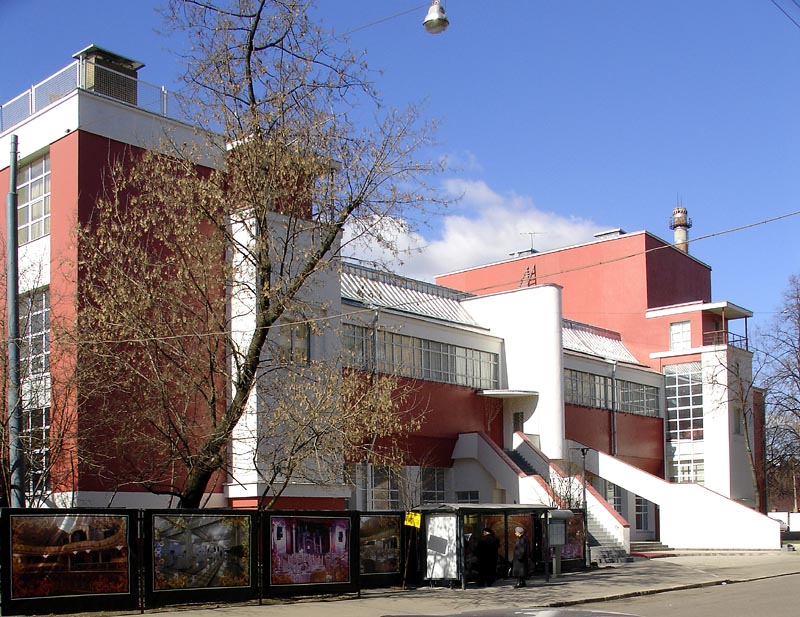
- Interactive map of the Svoboda Factory Club area

General information
- Architectural style: Avant-garde
- Location: 41A Vyatskaya Street, Moscow, Russia
- Construction started: 1927
- Completed: 1929
- Client: Chemists' Trade Union

Technical details
- Structural system: Masonry, steel roof structure

Design and construction
- Architect: Konstantin Melnikov

Svoboda Factory Club (Russian:Клуб фабрики "Свобода"), conceived as Chemists Trade Union Club (Клуб Химиков), also known as Maxim Gorky Palace of Culture (Дворец культуры имени Горького), is a listed memorial avant-garde building in Moscow, Russia, designed by Konstantin Melnikov in 1927 and completed in 1929. It is located at 41A, Vyatskaya Street, in Savyolovsky District.

== Evolution of design ==
Upon his return from Paris in 1925 and completion of Bakhmetevsky Bus Garage, Melnikov enjoyed a rush of commissions from trade unions, who launched a nationwide campaign to build workers' clubs in 1926. After negotiations with the Communal Workers Unions, who accepted his concept for Rusakov Workers' Club and rejected his Zuev Workers' Club (awarded to Ilya Golosov), Melnikov was employed by the Chemists' Union who planned to build one large (Svoboda Factory) and one small (Frunze Factory) club.

Initial concept for Svoboda Club was a flat elliptical tube raised above ground floor pilotis.

== Architecture ==
In the age of total steel rationing, the tubular concept was immediately blocked. Melnikov had to minimize the use of steel to the bare minimum (main span girders).

== Preservation ==
As of March, 2007, Svoboda Club is in quite good exterior condition. The building is painted to its original white-red color scheme. The only difference with 1920s photographs is the lack of color accent around end block windows (originally, there was a third color - a paler shade of red).

2007 photographs

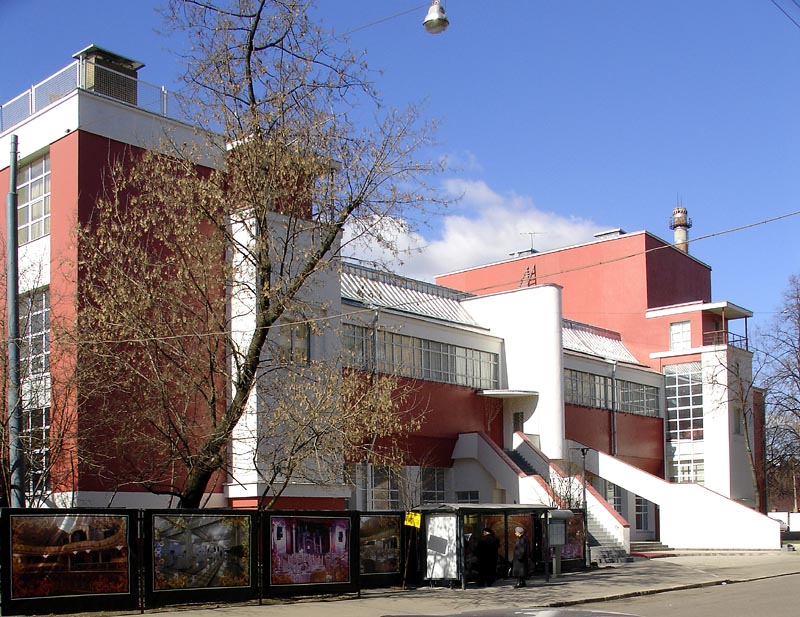
Vyatskaya Street facade

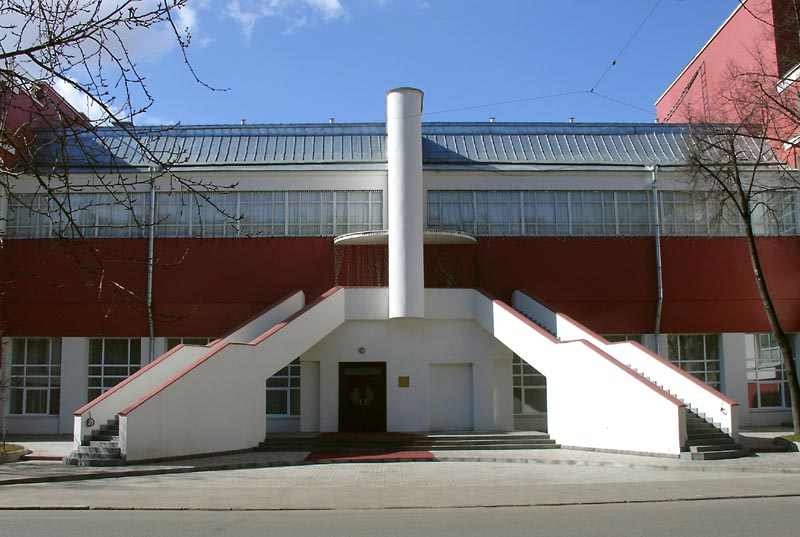
Facade stairs - fire escape from the theater hall

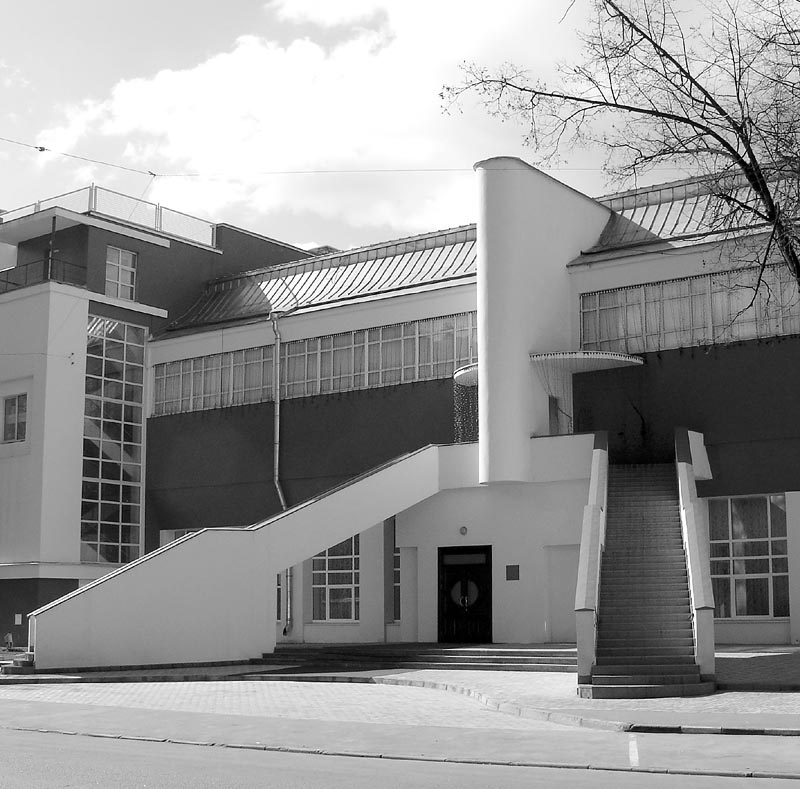
Stairs, side view

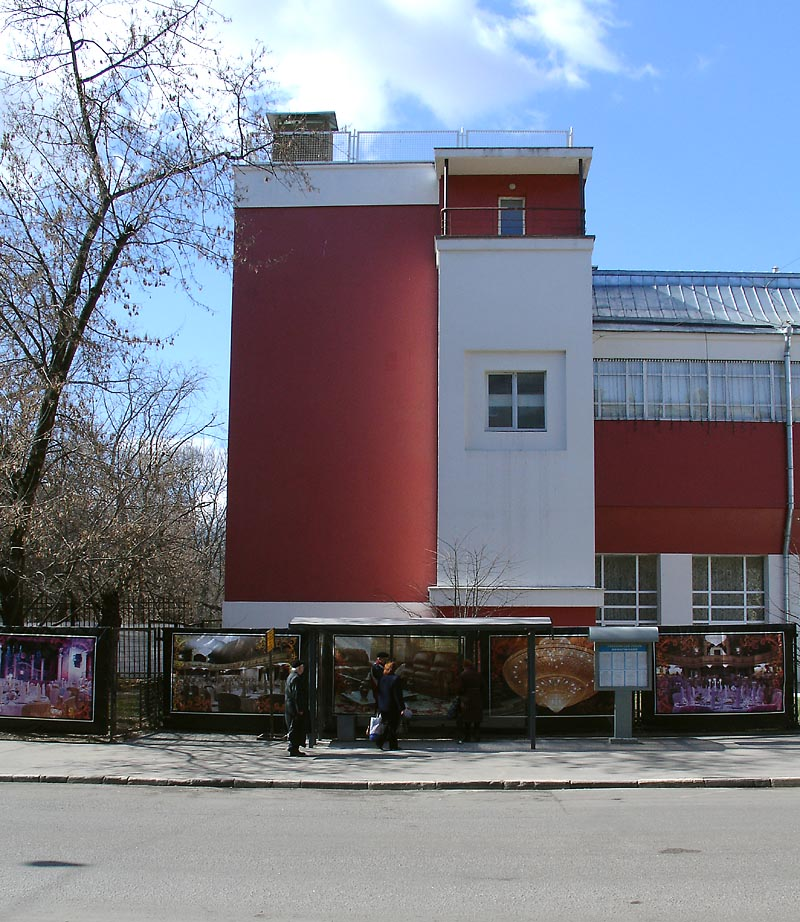
Original facade colors restored in 2000s
