= Iturri =

Iturri is a Basque surname. Notable people with the surname include:

- Carlos Iturri (1917–1999), Peruvian fencer
- Simón Iturri Patiño (1862–1947), Bolivian industrialist

It is also "fountain" in Basque and a street in Bilbao
