= Novo-Ryazanskaya Street Garage =

Constructivist building in Moscow, Russia

Truck garage in Novoryazanskaya Street
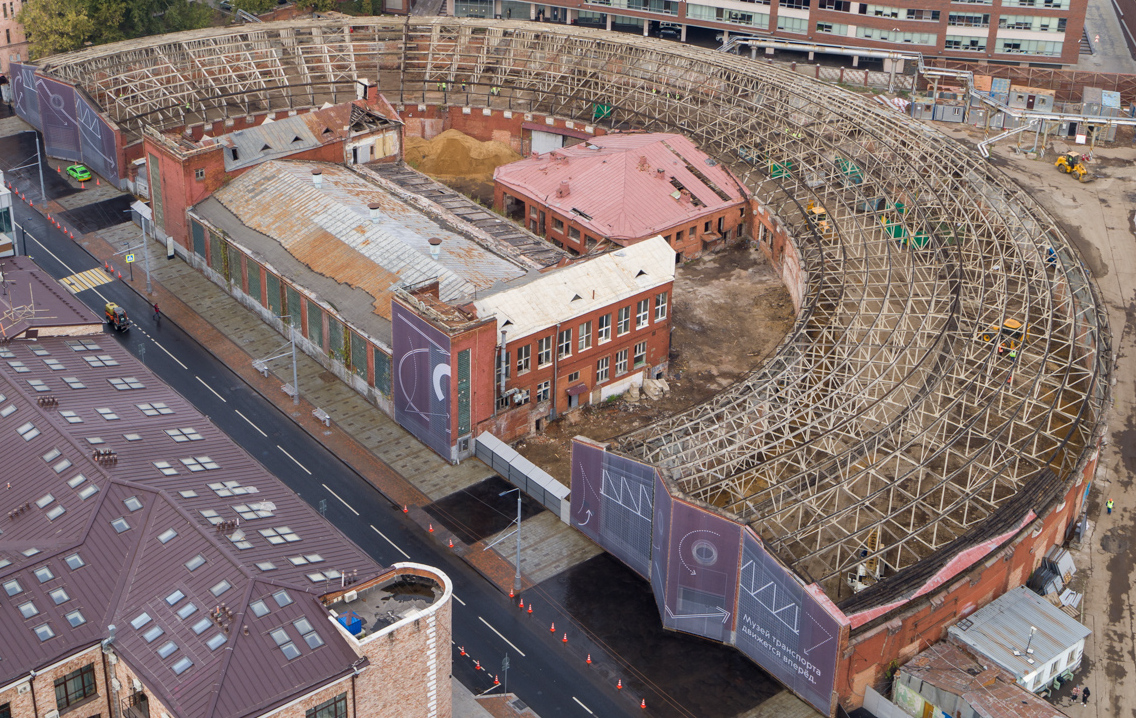
- 2022 photograph

General information
- Architectural style: Constructivist
- Location: 27 Novoryazanskaya Street, Moscow; 55°46′20″N 37°39′57″E, Russia
- Construction started: 1926
- Completed: 1929
- Client: City of Moscow

Technical details
- Structural system: Masonry, steel roof structure

Design and construction
- Architect: Konstantin Melnikov
- Structural engineer: Vladimir Shukhov

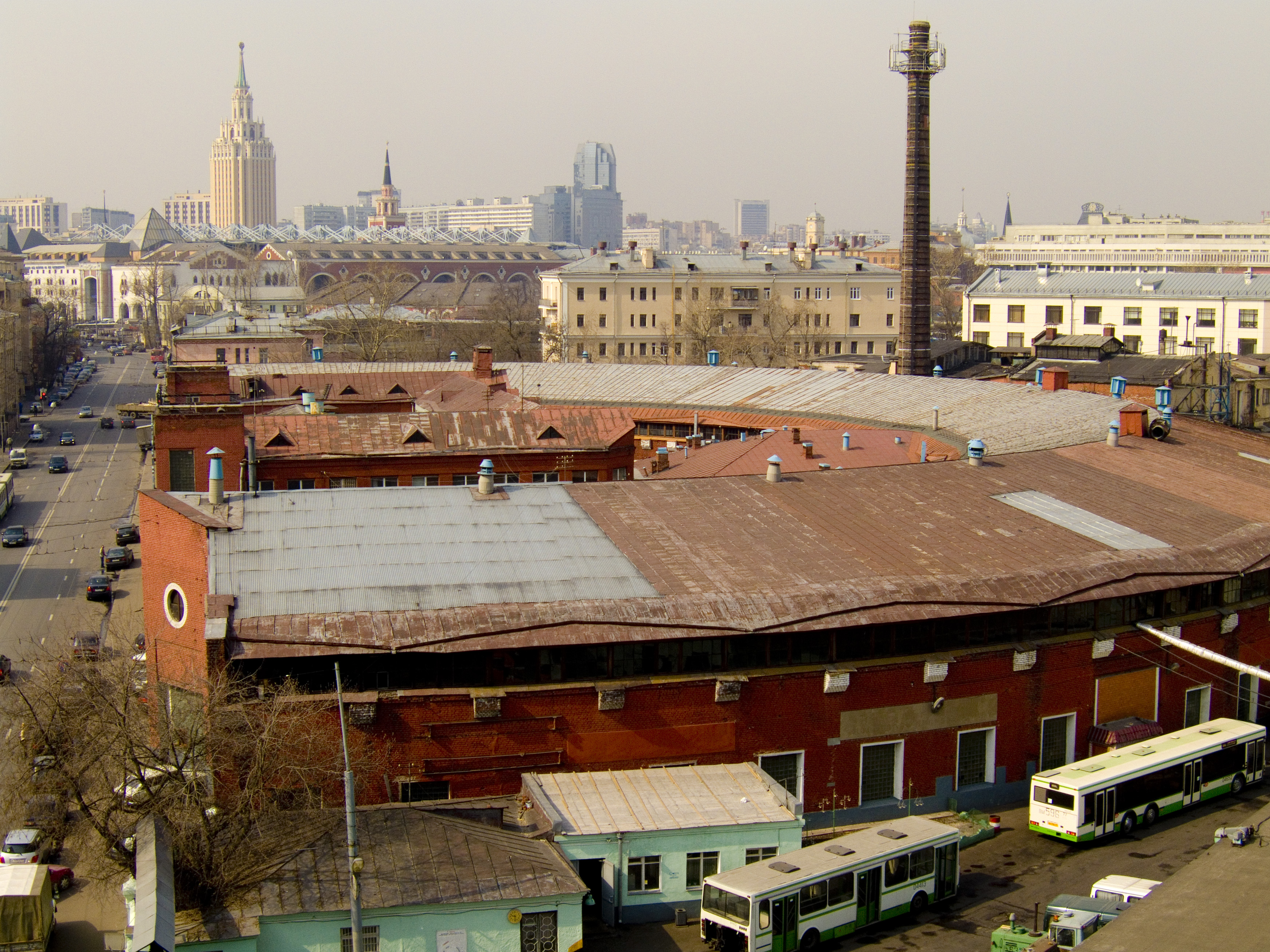
The Horseshoe Garage by Melnikov and Shukhov, 2008

Novoryazanskaya Street Garage, also spelled Novo-Ryazanskaya Street Garage, and known as "Horseshoe Garage", is a bus garage designed by Konstantin Melnikov and Vladimir Shukhov (structural engineering) in 1926 and completed in 1929 at 27, Novoryazanskaya Street in Krasnoselsky District, Moscow, Russia, near Kazansky Rail Terminal. This garage is still used as such, and houses Moscow's Fourth Bus Park until 2015.

Since September 2022, the garage buildings have been undergoing rebuild to accommodate the Moscow Transport Museum. The architect of the renovation project for the museum is Yuri Grigoryan.

== Photos ==
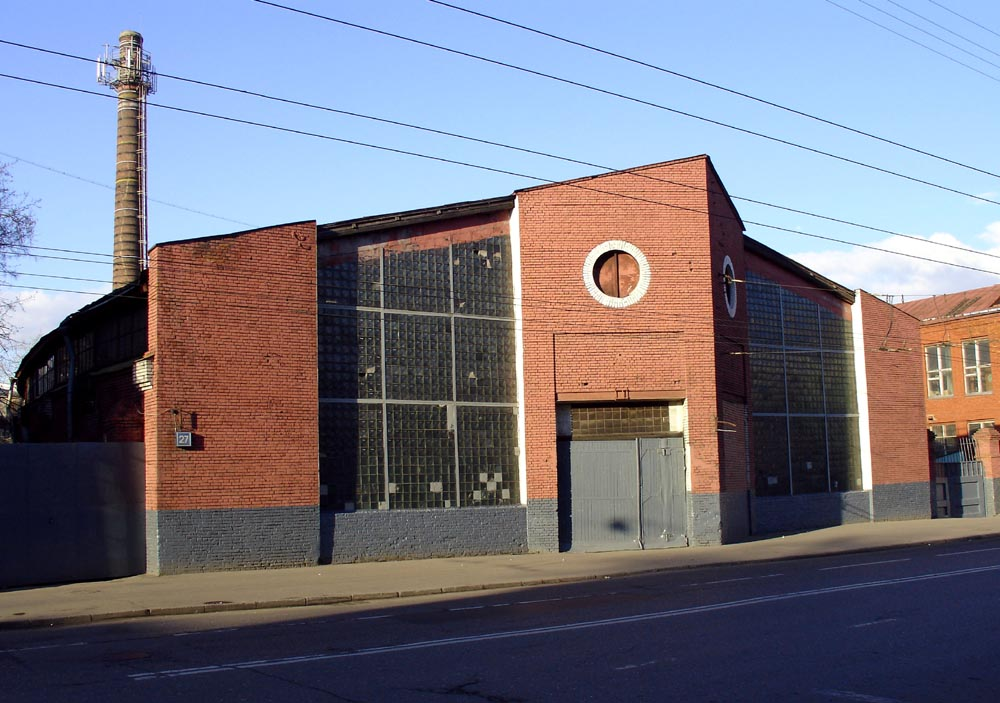

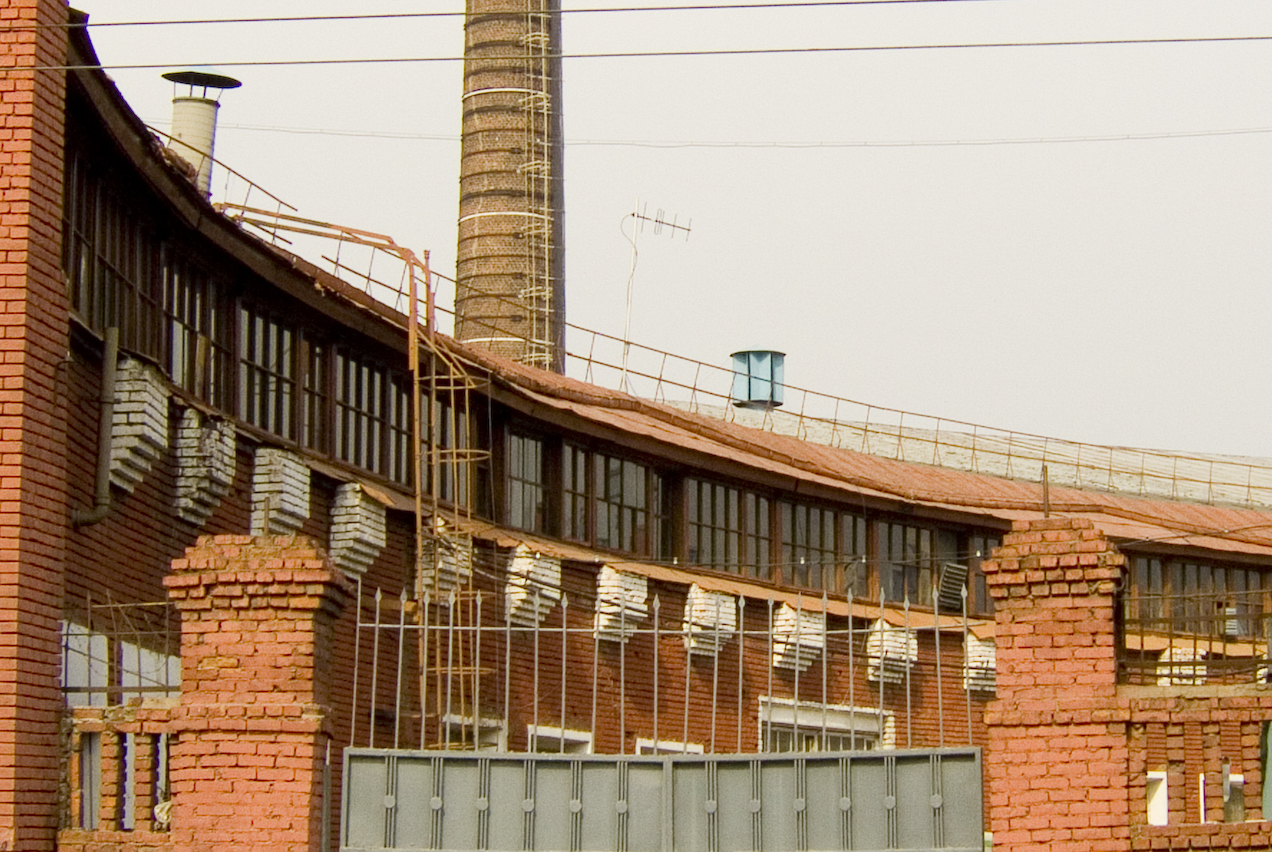

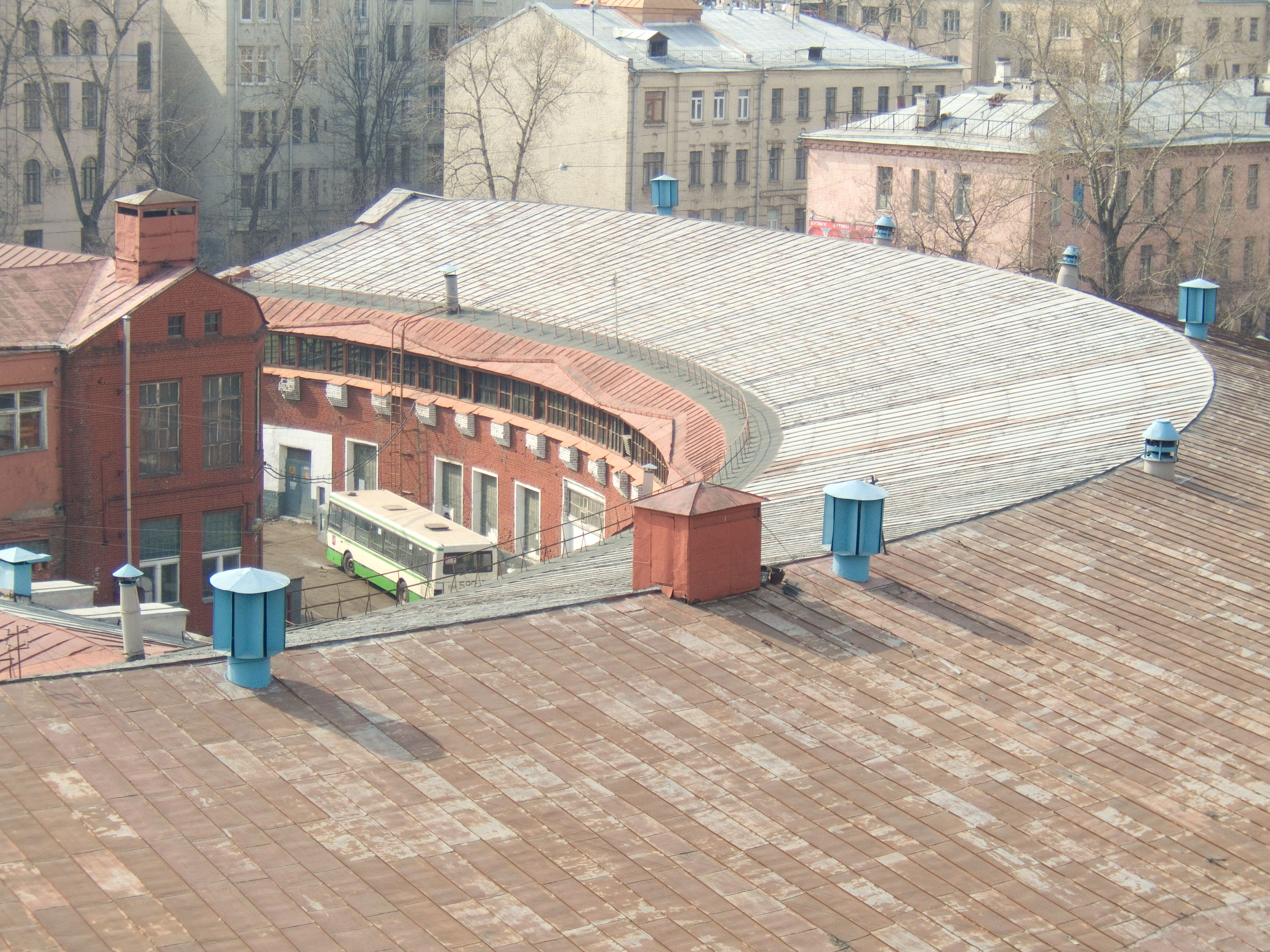

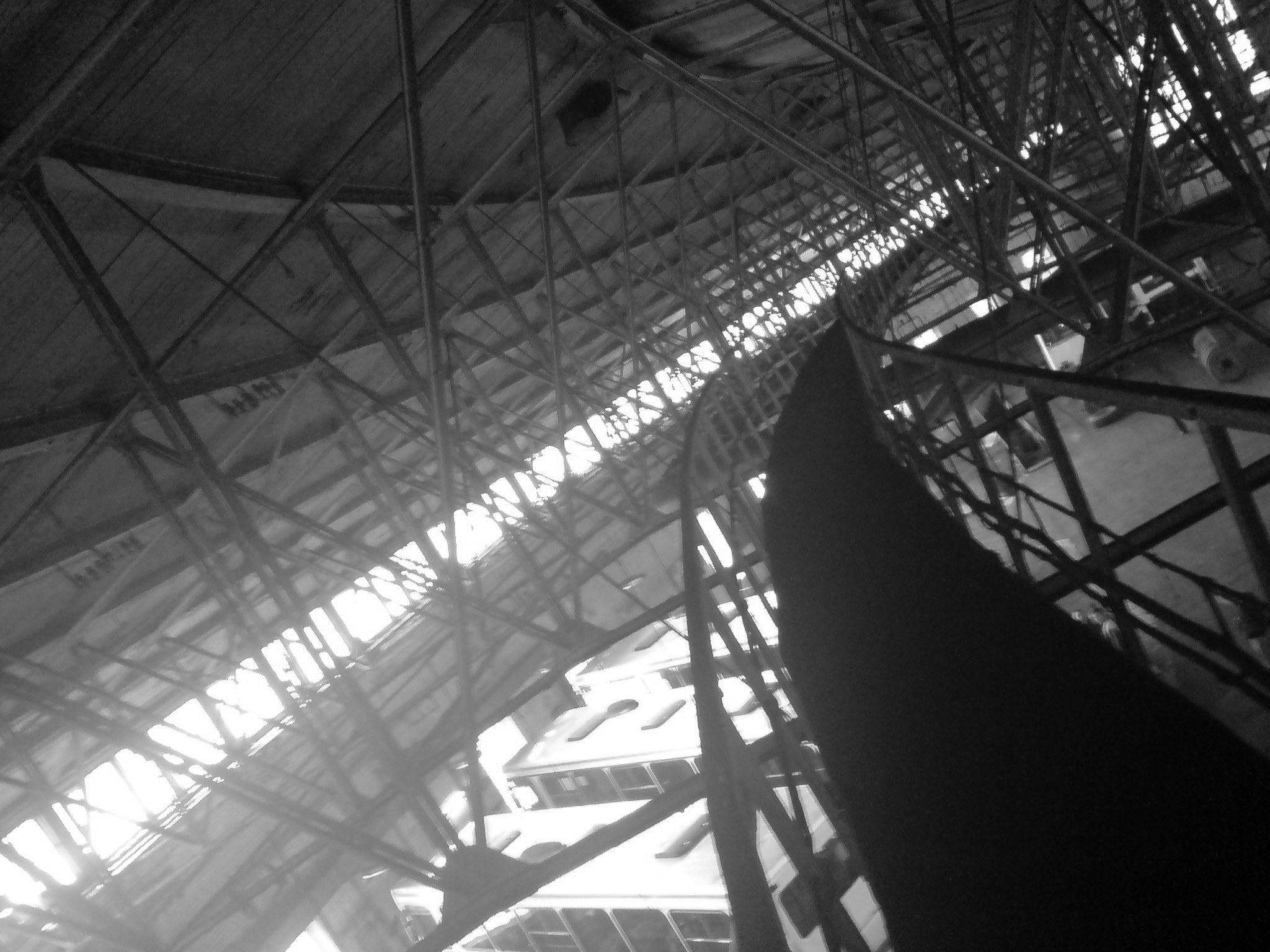

== See also ==
- Bakhmetevsky Bus Garage
- Konstantin Melnikov
- Vladimir Shukhov
