= Konstantin Melnikov =

Russian architect and painter (1890–1974)

Konstantin Stepanovich Melnikov
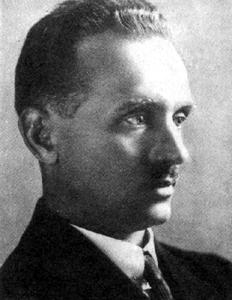
- Born: August 3, 1890; Moscow, Russian Empire
- Died: November 28, 1974 (aged 84); Moscow, Russian SFSR, Soviet Union
- Occupation: Architect
- Practice: Own practice (1923–1933); Mossover Planning Workshop No.7 (1933–1937)
- Buildings: Rusakov Workers' Club and 5 other trade union clubs in Moscow and Likino-Dulyovo

Konstantin Stepanovich Melnikov (Russian: Константин Степанович Мельников; 3 August [O.S. 22 July] 1890 – November 28, 1974) was a Russian architect and painter. His architectural work, compressed into a single decade (1923–1933), placed Melnikov on the front end of 1920s avant-garde architecture. Although associated with the Constructivists, Melnikov was an independent artist, not bound by the rules of a particular style or artistic group. In the 1930s, Melnikov refused to conform with the rising Stalinist architecture, withdrew from practice and worked as a portraitist and teacher until the end of his life.

== Biography ==
=== Childhood ===
Konstantin Melnikov was born and died in Moscow. He was the fourth child of the family. His father, Stepan Illarionovich Melnikov, originally from Nizhny Novgorod region, was a road maintenance foreman, employed by the Moscow Agricultural Academy. Mother, Yelena Grigorievna (née Repkina), came from the peasants of Zvenigorod district. The whole family occupied a single room of a state-managed working class barrack in Hay Lodge (Соломенная сторожка), then a quiet northern suburb of Moscow. The Melnikovs tried hard to rise above bitter poverty, to return to farming and eventually relocated to their own small house and set their own dairy farm. Konstantin Melnikov later praised his father, who noticed the little boy's addiction to drawing and regularly brought him scrap paper for drawing from the academy. However, all the education they could afford was a two-year parish school (completed in 1903).

=== Education ===
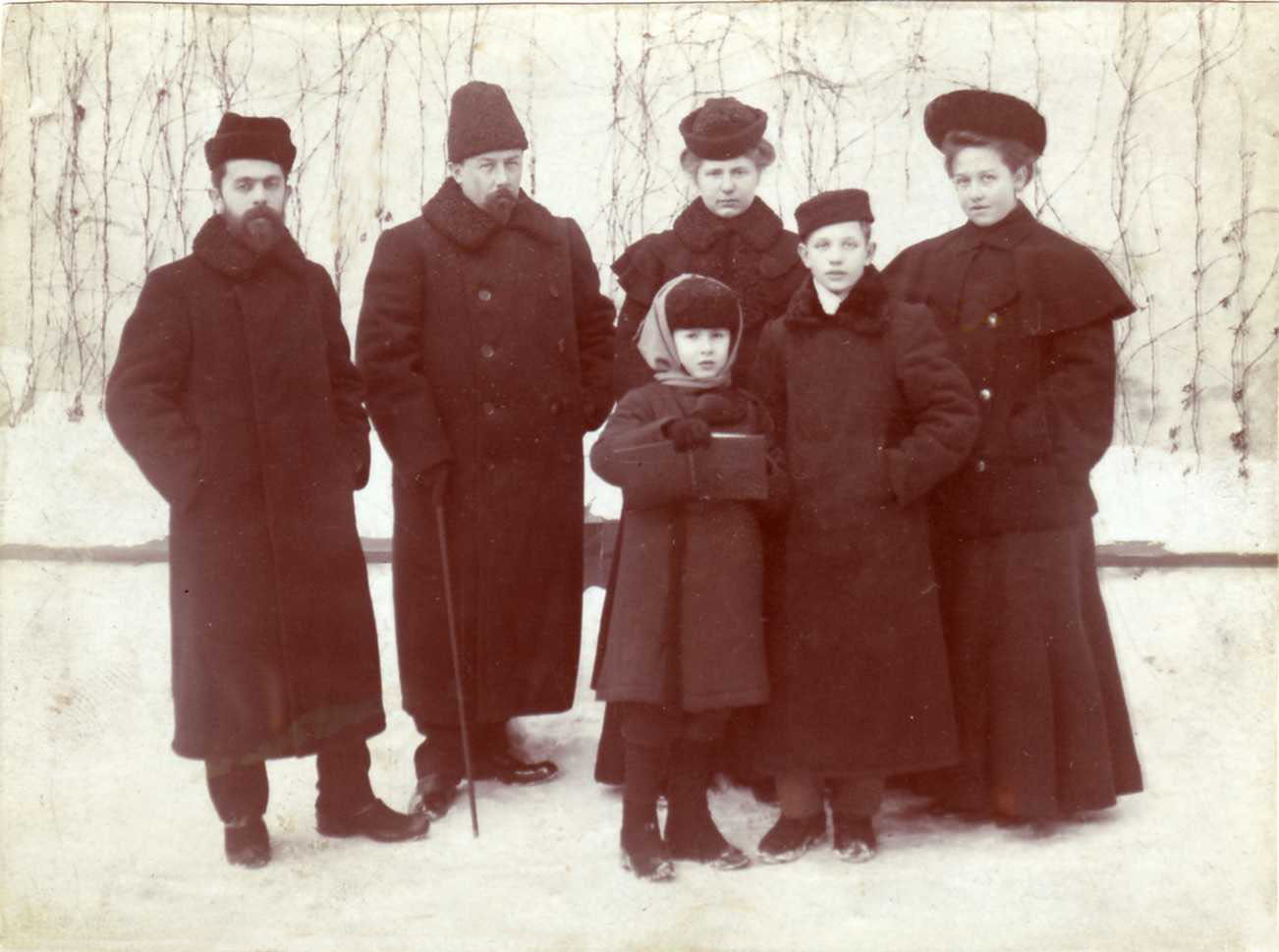
Professor Vladimir Mikhailovich Chaplin (second from left) with his family and his pupil Kostya Melnikov (second from the right). Moscow, 1904.

Konstantin met his "golden day in life" ("это был золотой день в моей жизни") through a milk delivery woman, who happened to serve the family of Vladimir Chaplin, a wealthy engineer. She recommended Konstantin's drawings to Chaplin, who was so impressed that he hired the teenager to his firm and paid for his art studies. Chaplin overestimated Melnikov's basic education, and Konstantin failed his grammar test at the Moscow School of Painting, Sculpture and Architecture in 1904. One year later, he passed the admissions that selected a class of 11 out of 270 applicants. Melnikov studied at the School for 12 years, first completing General Education (1910), then graduating in arts (1914) and Architecture (1917). Despite Chaplin's calls to concentrate on architecture, Melnikov leaned to painting; by the time he joined the Architecture classes, he already was a well-recognized portrait painter. Later, he recalled Konstantin Korovin, Sergey Malyutin and Abram Arkhipov as his mentors in art; as for architecture, he gave his regards only to Ivan Zholtovsky, his professor in 1917–1918.

Melnikov married Anna Yablokova in 1912; they had two children, born in 1913 and 1915.

=== Early career ===
During World War I and the first years after Russian Revolution of 1917, Melnikov worked within the Neoclassical tradition. Before the Revolution, he was involved in AMO Truck Plant project. In 1918–1920, he was employed by the New Moscow planning workshop headed by Zholtovsky and Alexey Shchusev, designing Khodynka and Butyrsky District sectors of the city. Meanwhile, the Russian educational system collapsed; the new art college, VKhUTEMAS, was formed in 1920. Its architectural faculty was split between three factions: An Academic Workshop (Ivan Zholtovsky), left-wing United Workshops (Nikolai Ladovsky), and a joint workshop of Melnikov and Ilya Golosov, known as New Academy and Workshop No.2. Melnikov and Golosov resisted both the academic and left-wing camps; in 1924, when the management merged New Academy with Academic Workshop, Melnikov quit VKhUTEMAS. In 1923–1924, Melnikov temporarily associated himself with the ASNOVA and LEF artistic groups, however, he was not involved in public disputes and made no public statements. In particular, he clearly distanced himself from the Constructivist group, led by Moisei Ginzburg and Alexander Vesnin.

His first success in architecture was a 1922 entry to a workers' housing contest. Codenamed Atom, Melnikov's design employed the sawtooth arrangement of units that became his trademark in later works. Unlike other, "revolutionary" projects, Atom was based on traditional single-family townhouse and apartment units.

Melnikov's first materialized works were short-lived, temporary buildings. The first, a 1923 pavilion for the All-Russian Agriculture and Handicraft Exhibition, featured more Melnikov trademarks:

- Raised cubical shapes are offset from supporting columns
- Combination of single-sloped roofs
- Glazed corners

The latter feature is shared with the Constructivists; single-sloped, angled roof was against the constructivist canon but a good match to existing technologies: Soviet industry of 1920s did not have the technology for reliable flat roofing.

=== Melnikov Garage ===
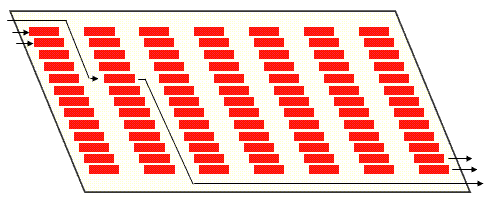
Melnikov's concept floorplan, Bakhmetevsky Garage

In 1925 Melnikov designed and built the Soviet pavilion at the Paris Exposition Internationale des Arts Décoratifs et Industriels Modernes. The wooden pavilion, employing a combination of single-sloped roofs of different sizes, was regarded as being one of the most progressive buildings at the fair. Unlike other Paris pavilions, it was completed in less than a month, employing not more than 10 workers.

Still in Paris, Melnikov designed two privately commissioned versions of a ramped garage that never got past the conceptual drawing stage. In the second version of this project, Melnikov found a useful pattern of placing cars in a garage (again, a sawtooth pattern) where cars could park and leave without using reverse gear. The second In Moscow, Melnikov saw a new fleet of Leyland buses hoarded in a yard in Zamoskvorechye, and immediately proposed his concept to the city. The result, Bakhmetevsky Bus Garage, housed 104 buses on 8500 square meters of an unconventional, parallelogram-shaped floorplan with Vladimir Shukhov's roof system.

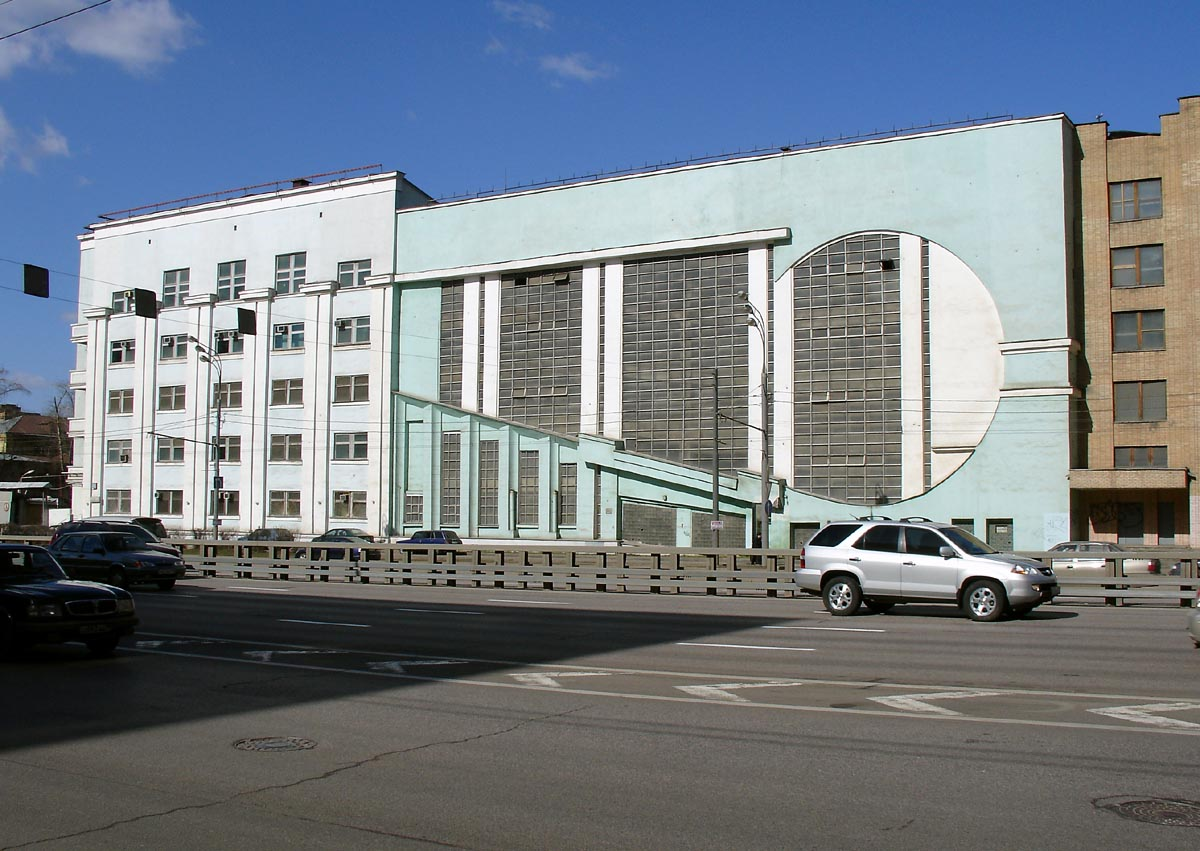
Intourist Garage, the only facade remaining to date

Melnikov later called this project "the start of my Golden Season". Bakhmetevsky Garage, sometimes incorrectly called a constructivist landmark, was very modestly styled in an indefinite "industrial" red brick. Melnikov's later garage buildings, on the contrary, possessed a clear avant-garde external styling (which has become badly damaged over time):

- 1926-1929: Horseshoe-shaped truck garage, Novo-Ryazanskaya Street (with Vladimir Shukhov)
- 1933-1936: Intourist car garage, Suschevsky Val Street (with Andrey Kurochkin)
- 1934-1936: Gosplan car garage, Aviamotornaya Street

=== Melnikov Clubs ===
The "golden season" of 1927 continued with a chain of trade union commissions for workers' clubs. "Beginning in 1927, my influence developed into a monopoly takeover... that's how love will treat you if she really loves you" ("Начиная с 1927, мой авторитет вырос в монопольный захват... вот так поступит любовь и с Вами, если она Вас полюбит").

Nationwide construction of new, dedicated buildings for workers' clubs (combining propaganda, educational and community center functions) was launched in 1926 and peaked in 1927, when trade unions commissioned 30 clubs in Moscow region (10 in the city of Moscow). Melnikov won five of these ten projects (his sixth club is located in Likino-Dulyovo). Absence of public contests for these buildings was favorable to Melnikov, who was promoted by enthusiastic trade union commissioners, regardless of design complexity or political and artistic affiliations. He had a chance to build practically exactly as planned, with very little changes by the client (notably, omission of swimming pools).

All six workers' clubs of this period differ in shape, size, and functional set. Melnikov's clients (the unions) were not competent in exact functions of these buildings, thus each Melnikov draft is also a functional program with different balance between main hall and other space. The club, according to Melnikov, is not a single fixed theater hall, but a flexible system of different halls that may be united into a single, large volume when necessary. His larger main halls can be divided into three (Rusakov Club) or two (Svoboda Club) independent halls.

One common feature of his clubs – bold use of exterior stairs – is actually a consequence of 1920s building codes that required wide internal staircase for fire evacuation. Melnikov, in an attempt to save interior space, connected the main halls to exterior galleries, which was not regulated by the code.

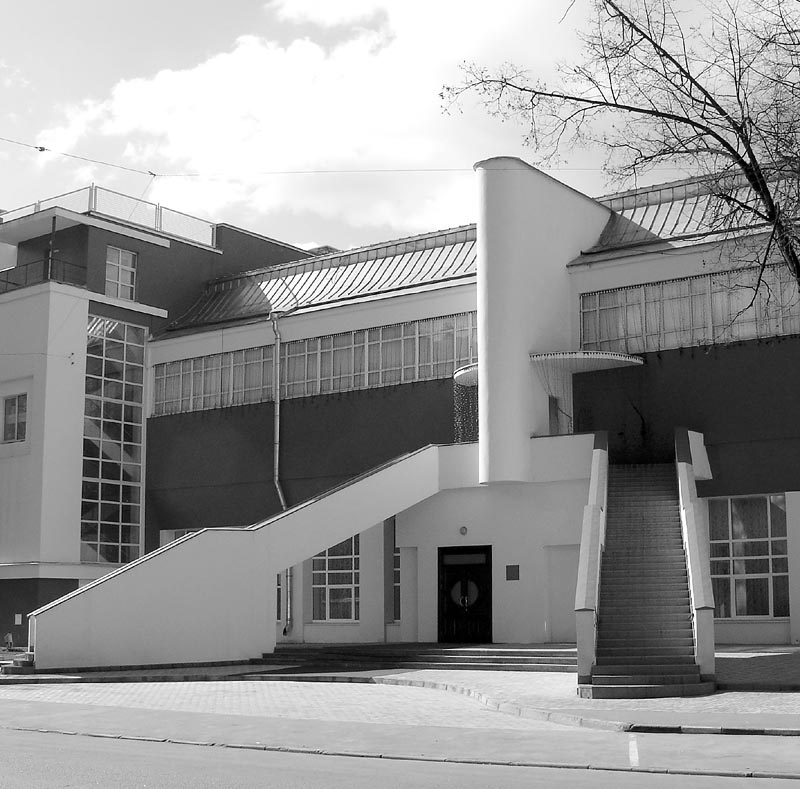
Svoboda Club in northern Moscow was Melnikov's tribute to the land of his childhood

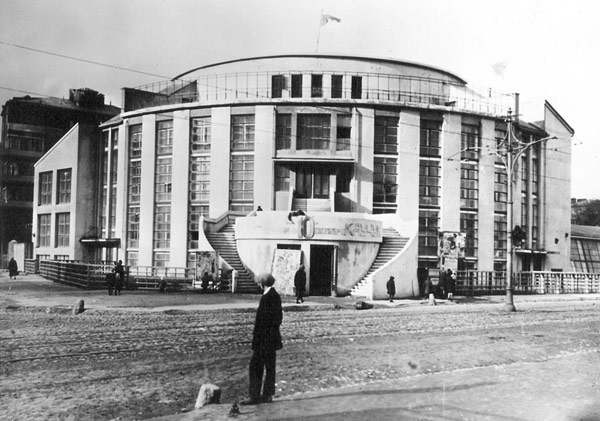
1920s photo: Konstantin Melnikov in front of his Kauchuk Club

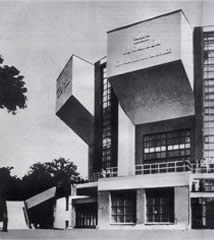
Rusakov Club, 1927–1929

=== Melnikov House ===
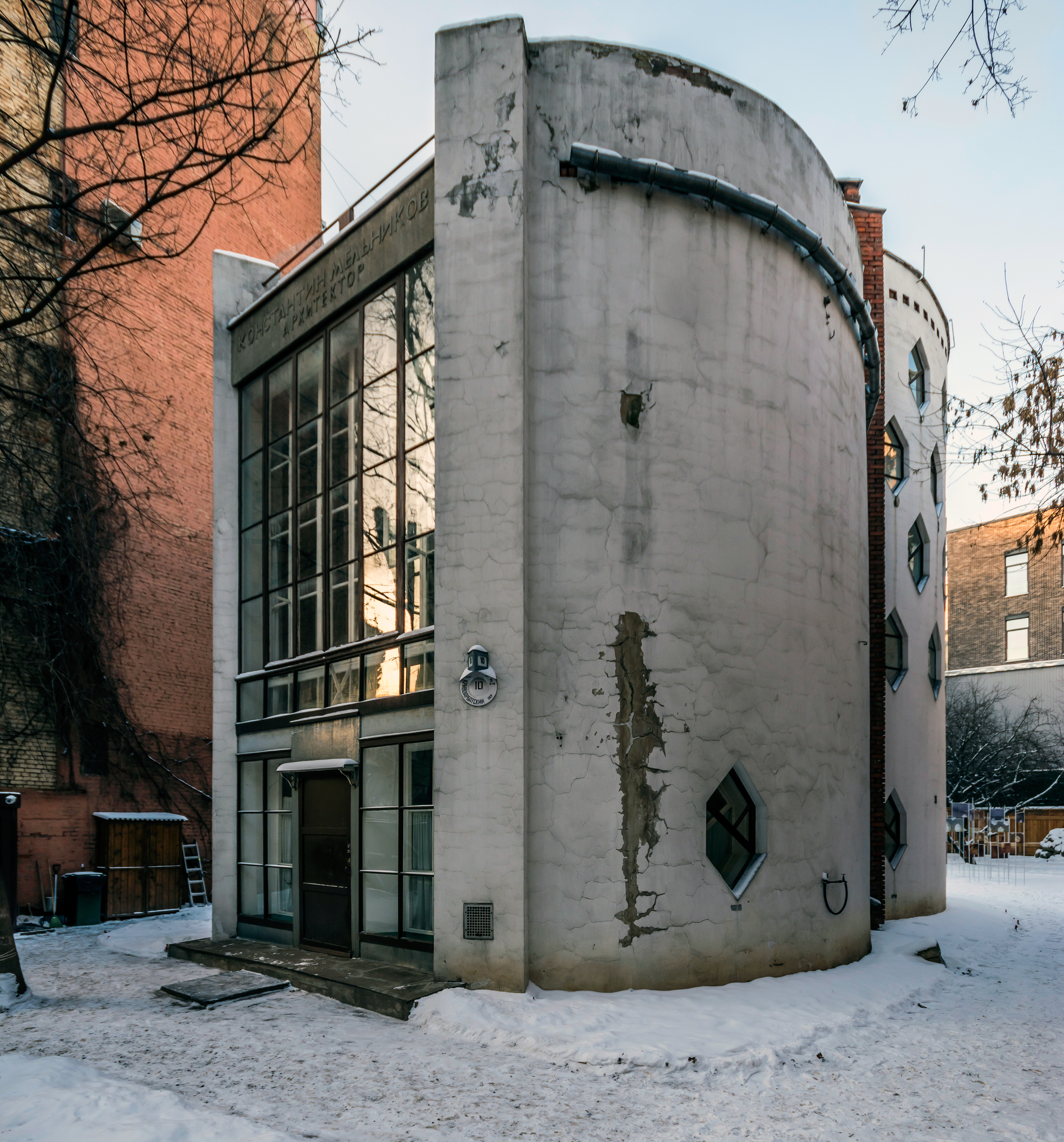
The Melnikov House, as seen from Krivoarbatsky Street

The finest existing specimen of Melnikov's work is his own Krivoarbatsky Lane residence in Moscow, completed in 1927–1929, which consists of two intersecting cylindrical towers decorated with a pattern of hexagonal windows. His flow of commissions in 1926-1927 provided enough money to finance a three-story house of his dreams. At this time, many well-to-do Russians were into building their own city houses; Melnikov was one of the few who managed to retain his property after the fall of New Economic Policy. His request for land (790 square meters) had few chances to pass the district commission; to his surprise, a working class commissioner supported him, saying that "we can build public buildings anytime and anywhere, but we may never see this unusual house completed if we reject Melnikov". The city endorsed Melnikov's draft as an experimental, one-of-a-kind project.

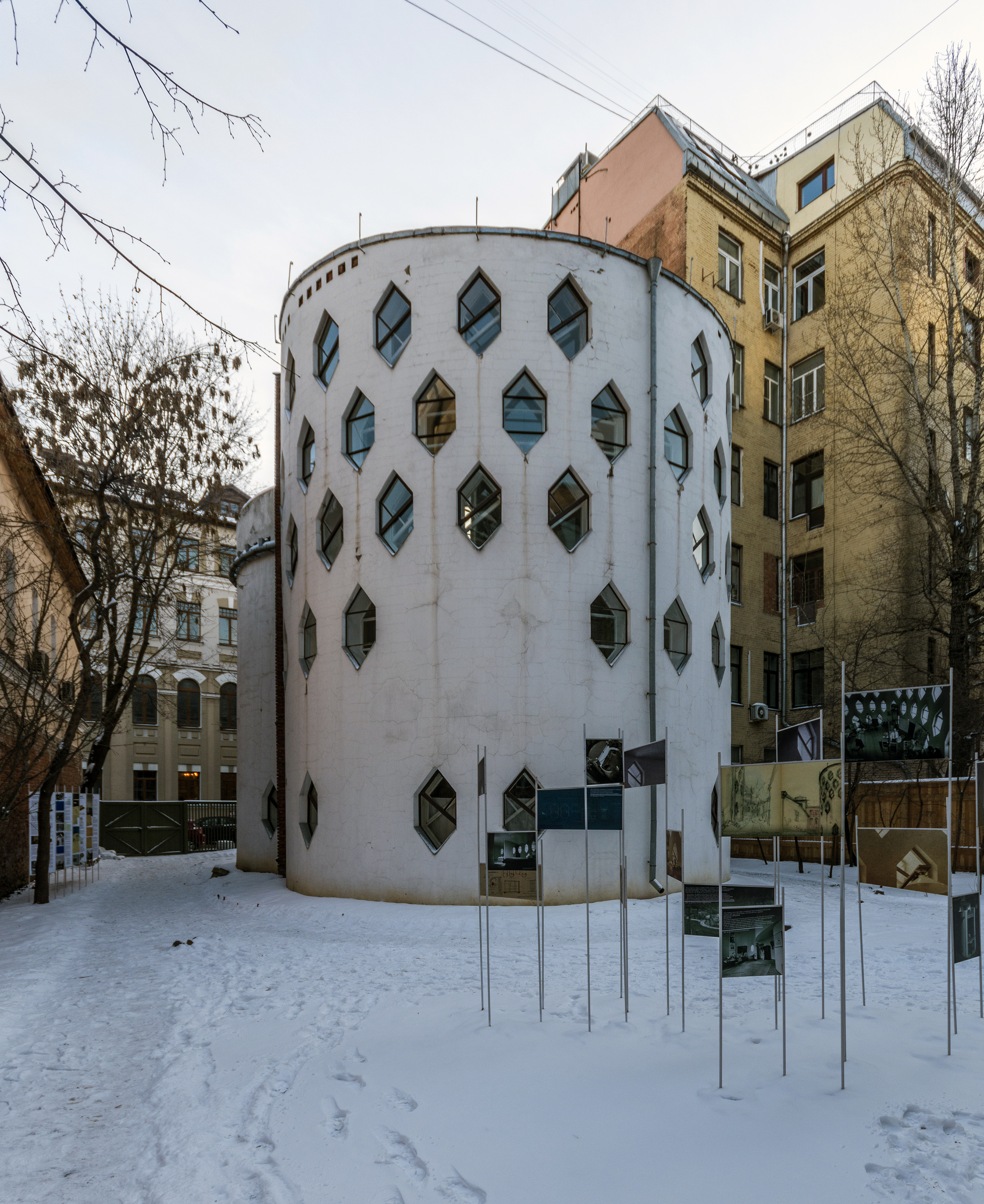
Rear of the Melnikov House

Melnikov preferred to work at home, and always wanted a spacious residence that could house his family, architectural and painting workshops. As the Russian idiom says, he designed the house starting "from the hearth"; existing white oven in his living room dates back to his 1920 drawings. Floorplan evolved from a plain square to a circle and an egg shape, without much attention to exterior finishes. Melnikov developed the concept of intersecting cylinders in 1925-1926 for his Zuev Workers' Club draft (he lost the contest to Ilya Golosov). Twin cylinder floorplan was approved by the city in June 1927 and was revised during construction.

The towers, top to bottom, are a honeycomb lattice made of brickwork. 60 of more than 200 cells were glazed with windows (of three different frame designs), the rest filled with clay and scrap. This unorthodox design was a direct consequence of material rationing by the state – Melnikov was limited to brick and wood, and even these were in short supply. The wooden ceilings have no supporting columns, nor horizontal girders. They were formed by a rectangular grid of flat planks, in a sort of orthotropic deck. The largest room, a 50 square meter workshop on the third floor, is lit with 38 hexagonal windows; equally large living room has a single wide window above the main entrance.

Melnikov House video (2010)

In 1929, Melnikov proposed the same system of intersecting cyliitecture – is a honeycomb lattice shell made of bricks with hexahedral cells. The similar lattice shells out of metal were patented and built by Vladimir Shukhov in 1896. Melnikov built his house in 1927–1929, and by that time in Russia there had been already built about 200 Shukhov's steel lattice shells as the overhead covers of buildings, hyperboloid water and other towers, including the famous 160 meter radio tower in Moscow (1922). Since Melnikov and Shukhov were well acquainted with each other and made joint projects (Bakhmetevsky Bus Garage, Novo-Ryazanskaya Street Garage), it is not surprising that the Melnikov's house in Krivoarbatsky pereulok was built in the form of an original lattice shell. The overhead covers of the own Мelnikov's house are the honeycomb lattice shells made of wooden boards placed edgewise.

=== End of career ===
Throughout 1933–1937, as a leader of the Mossovet Seventh Planning Workshop, Melnikov was involved in city planning projects for the south-western sector of Moscow (Arbat Square and Khamovniki District). None of them materialized. These assignments looked like an appreciation of his talent, but in fact separated Melnikov from actual construction projects.

His final public statement was a 1936 contest entry for the Soviet pavilion at 1937 World Expo in Paris. He lost the contest to Boris Iofan. By 1937, mounting criticism against "formalism" led to the virtual excommunication of Melnikov from practice. He was not exactly forgotten; on the contrary, his Rusakov Club and Arbat house were present in many Soviet textbooks as examples of Formalism.

Melnikov retained his Arbat house and lived there, safely, with his family until his death. He returned to portrait painting and lectured at engineering colleges. Melnikov also designed privately commissioned, unimportant architectural jobs – summer houses, shop interiors – some of which materialized.

Melnikov returned to the public contest stage four times:

- 1954 – for the Pantheon and 300 years of Russian-Ukrainian Unity monument
- 1958 – Palace of Soviets (post-World War II contest)
- 1962 – Soviet Pavilion at the 1964 New York World's Fair
- 1967 – Cinema on Arbat Street (next to his own house)

In the 1960s Melnikov enjoyed a brief revival of interest in his architecture. His 75th birthday (1965) was officially celebrated by the House of Architects in Moscow; in 1967 and 1972 he was awarded the honorary titles of Doctor of Architecture and Meritorious Architect.

Melnikov died at the age of 84 and was interred in the Vvedenskoye Cemetery in the Lefortovo District of Moscow. His son, Viktor, also a painter, lived and worked at the Arbat house, and fought to have it preserved as a museum until his death in February 2006. The house contains a significant portion of Konstantin S. Melnikov's archive.

== Buildings ==
Years are referenced to

=== Completed buildings ===
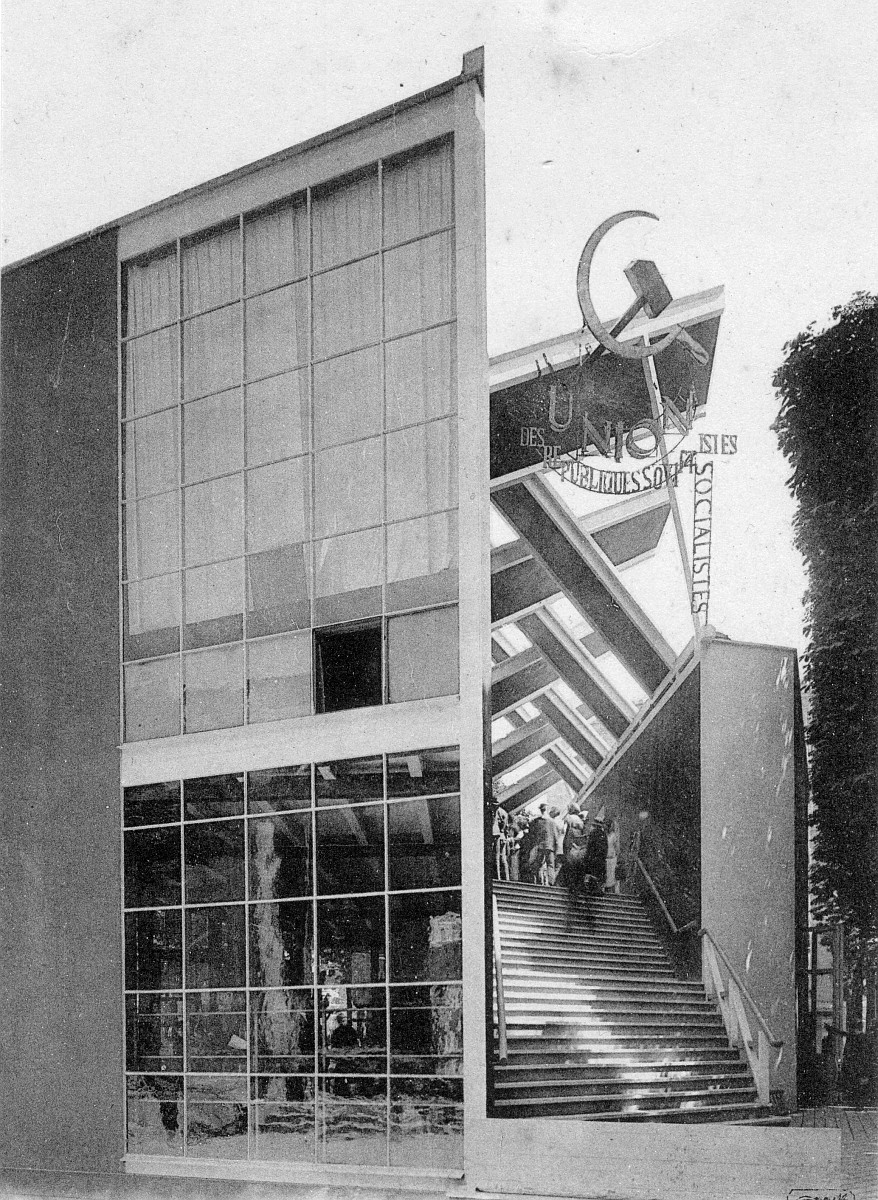
USSR pavilion in Paris, 1925

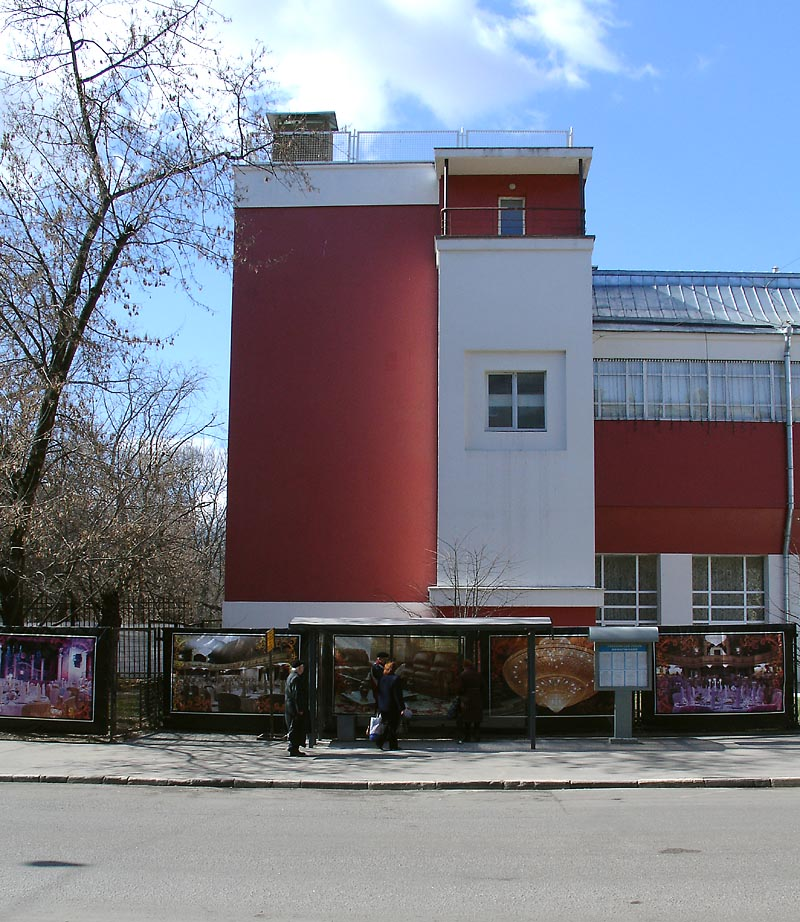
Melnikov's original color scheme of recently restored Svoboda Club

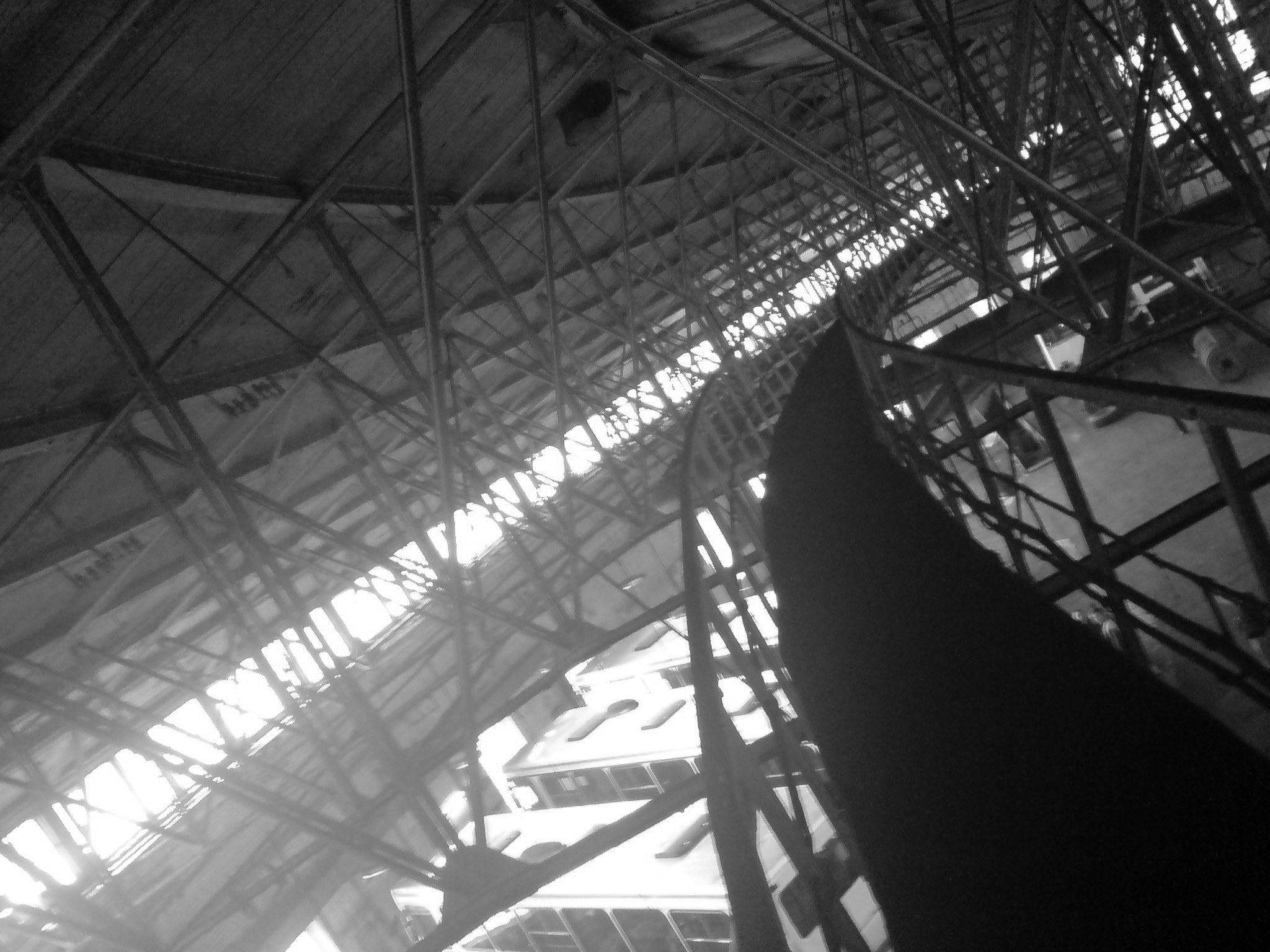
Steel roof of Novo-Ryazanskaya Street Garage

- 1915–1917 - Junior architect for the AMO Truck Plant housing and offices, Moscow (destroyed) 55°42′10.28″N 37°38′0.58″E
- 1923 – Makhorka Pavilion for the All Russian Agricultural and Handicraft Industries Exhibition, Moscow (destroyed) 55°43′34.35″N 37°35′57.3″E
- 1924–1925 - New Sukharev Market in Moscow (destroyed) 55°46′19.49″N 37°37′43.55″E
- 1924–1925 - Office of New Sukharev Market in Moscow 55°46′18.38″N 37°37′39.69″E
- 1925 – Competition entry for the USSR Pavilion of the Exposition Internationale des Arts Décoratifs et Industriels Modernes, Paris (destroyed) 48°51′55.12″N 2°18′57.76″E
- 1926–1927 - Bakhmetevsky Bus Garage, 11 Obraztsova Street, Moscow 55°47′21.31″N 37°36′29.2″E
- 1927–1929: The "Golden Season" of Melnikov
  - Kauchuk Factory Club, 64 Plyuschikha Street, Moscow 55°44′8.68″N 37°34′26.78″E
  - Burevestnik Factory Club, 17 s1 3-ya Rybinskaya Street, Moscow 55°47′26.68″N 37°39′39.87″E
  - Svoboda Factory Club, 41 Vyatskaya Street, Moscow (also known as Gorky Palace of Culture) 55°48′1.79″N 37°34′53.14″E
  - Rusakov Workers' Club, 6 Stromynka Street, Moscow 55°47′28.16″N 37°41′14.11″E
  - Frunze Workers' Club, 28, Berezhkovskaya Embankment, Moscow (endangered) 55°43′51.8″N 37°32′51.79″E
  - Porcelain Factory Club, Likino-Dulyovo (at the time Dulyovo) 55°42′22.28″N 38°57′31.05″E
  - Melnikov's own residence, Krivoarbatsky Lane, Moscow 55°44′52.91″N 37°35′22.25″E
  - Novo-Ryazanskaya Street Garage (Horseshoe Garage), 27 Novoryazanskaya Street, Moscow 55°46′21.49″N 37°39′58.65″E
- 1930–1931 - Reconstruction of Kamerny Theater in Moscow 55°45′44.01″N 37°36′5.78″E
- 1934–1936 - Intourist Garage, 33 Suschevsky Val Street, Moscow 55°44′22.63″N 37°43′19.1″E
- 1934–1936 - Gosplan Garage, 63 Aviamotornaya Street, Moscow 55°47′36.03″N 37°36′25.29″E
- 1937–1938 - Novinsky Boulevard planning, Moscow
- 1945–1947 - Exterior paint scheme design for Mikoyan Slaughterhouses, Moscow (destroyed) 55°43′39.18″N 37°41′4″E

=== Selected competition entries and concepts ===
- 1918–1920 - Drafts of workers' housing, Alexeyevskaya Hospital housing and the People's House in Moscow (not related to his 1922 drafts)
- 1921–1923 - Competition entry for workers' housing and for the Palace of Labour, Moscow (never built)
- 1921–1923 - Butyrsky District and Khodynka planning for the New Moscow master plan (never completed)
- 1924 – Design of Lenin's sarcophagus (awarded to Alexey Shchusev, author of first, temporary Mausoleum)
- 1924–1925 - Competition entry for the Moscow bureau of the newspaper Leningrad Pravda (won by Vesnin brothers, never built)
- 1925 – Garage concepts for the new Seine bridges in Paris
- 1927 – Zuev Workers' Club, Moscow (awarded to Ilya Golosov, see executed building)
- 1928 – Gorky Park (Moscow), landscape project
- 1929 – Competition entry for the Monument of Christopher Columbus, Santo Domingo. (never built)
- 1932–1933 - Competition entry for the Palace of the Soviets (project awarded to Boris Iofan and Vladimir Shchuko, never built)
- 1934 – Competition entry for the Narkomtiazhprom building, Red Square, Moscow (never built)
- 1934–1936 - Planning drafts for Luzhniki, Kotelnicheskaya Embankment and other city planning proposals
- 1936 – Competition entry for the Soviet Pavilion at the Exposition Internationale des Arts et Techniques dans la Vie Moderne (1937) (awarded to Boris Iofan, completed and destroyed in 1936)
- 1954–1955 - Competition entries for the Pantheon and the monument to 300 years of Russian-Ukrainian Unity (never built)
- 1958–1959 - Competition entry for the Palace of the Soviets (post-war round, never built)
- 1962 – USSR Pavilion for the World Expo in New York City
- 1967 – Competition entry for the cinema in Arbat Street (never built)

== Gallery ==
=== Completed buildings ===
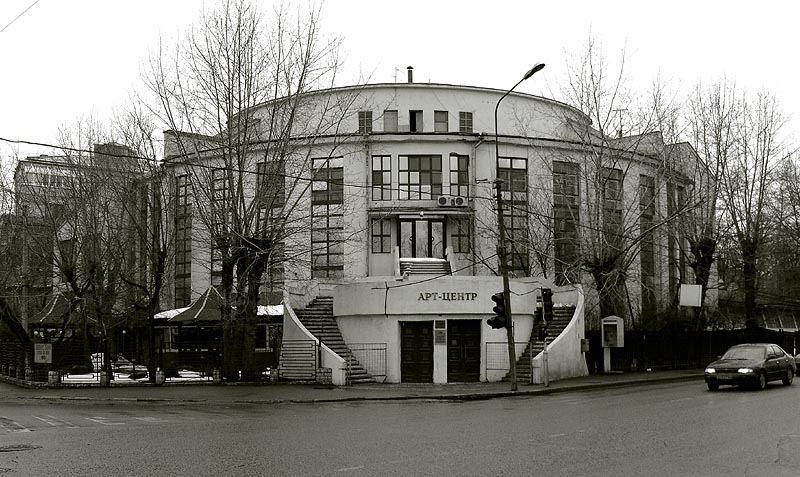
Kauchuk Club (2007 photo)

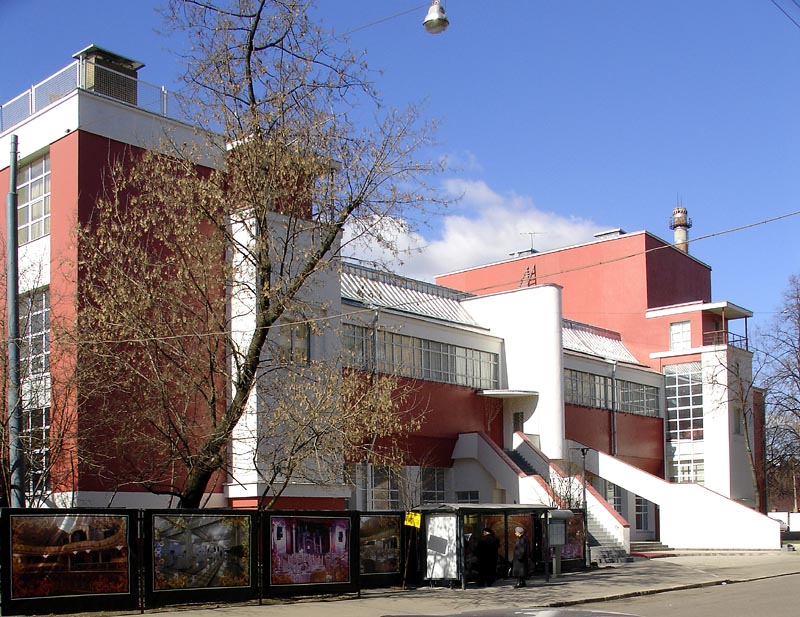
Svoboda Factory Club (2007 photo)

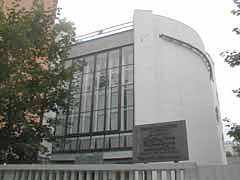
Own house, main entrance and living room window

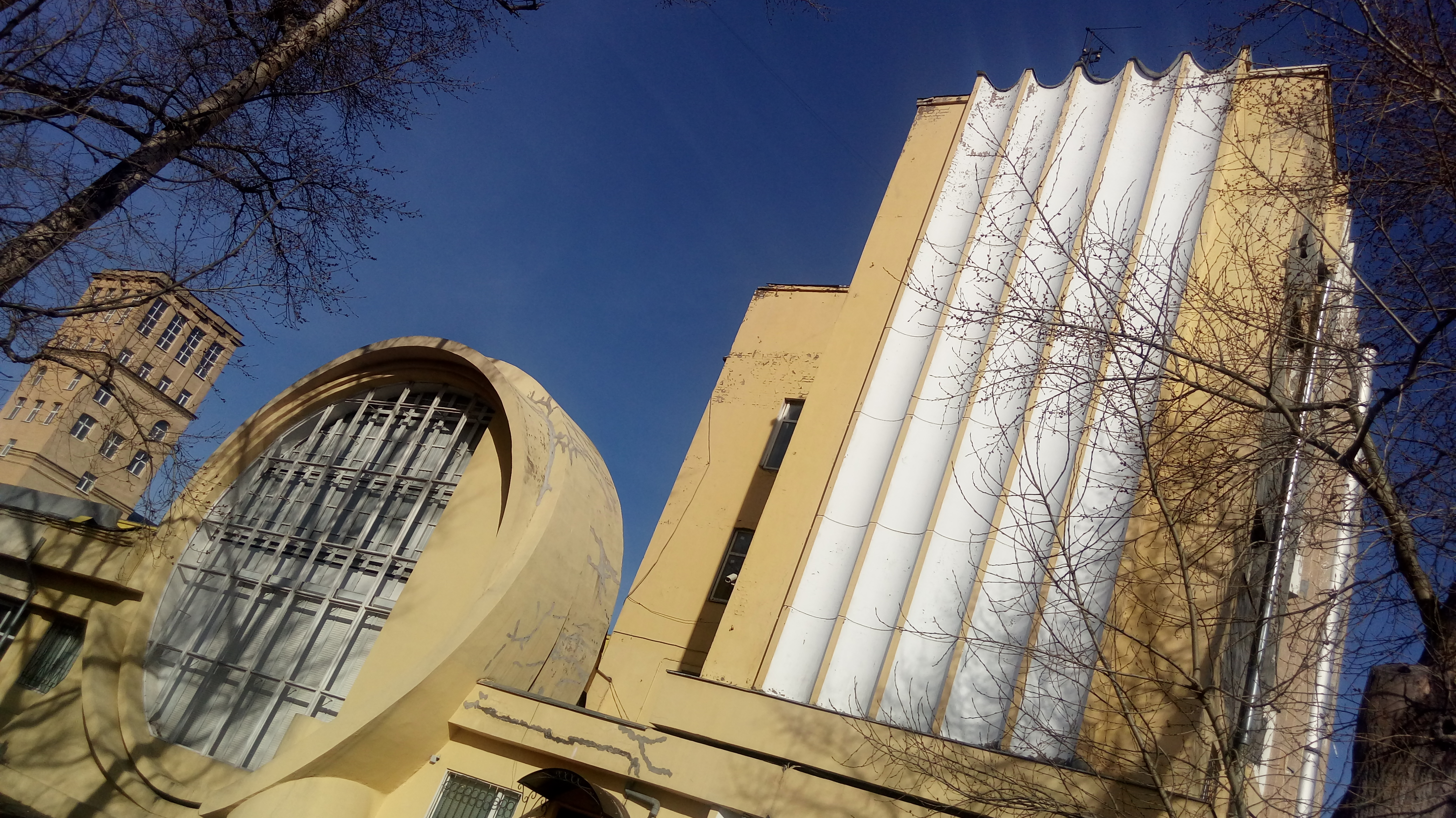
Gosplan Garage (2017)
