= Venya D'rkin =

Russian bard (1970–1999)

Venya D'rkin Литвинов Александр Михайлович
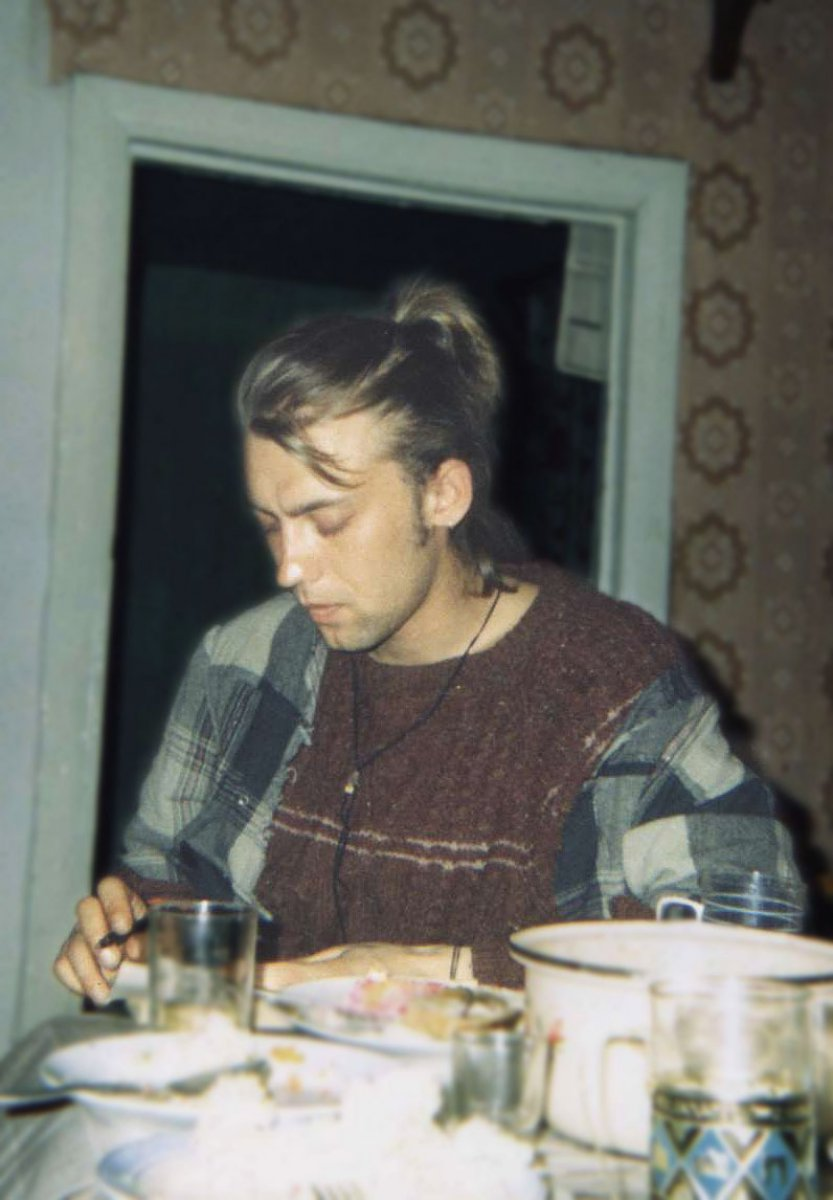

Background information
- Also known as: Venya D'rkin, Drantya
- Born: 11 June 1970; Dovzhanskyi, Luhansk Oblast, USSR
- Died: 21 August 1999 (aged 29) Korolyov, Moscow Oblast, Russia
- Genres: Folk rock, sung poetry
- Occupations: Bard, poet, songwriter, singer, composer, painter
- Instruments: Vocals, acoustic guitar, percussion, harmonica, bard
- Years active: 1991—1999
- Labels: Russian: Дрдом, Отделение Выход, Выргород
- Formerly of: Russian: Д'ркин-Бэнд
- Website: https://drdom.info/

Venya D'rkin (Russian: Веня Д'ркин; 11 June 1970 in Dovzhanskyi, Luhansk Oblast, Soviet Union, now Dovzhanske, Ukraine – 21 August 1999 in Korolyov, Moscow Oblast, Russia), real name – Alexander Mikhailovich Litvinov (Russian: Александр Михайлович Литвинов), was a Ukrainian Russian-language bard, poet, artist, painter, and writer of fairy tales. Over his lifetime, he had written over three hundred songs. As usual in the bard genre, the songs contain imaginative lyrics, but, less commonly, are also very melodic. During the late 1990s, he performed some of his songs accompanied by other musicians, notably the violinist Veronika Belyayeva.

In a 1998 interview in the Russian Rock-n-Roller newspaper (4 November), his stage name was explained by his "agent" Natalia: at one festival, he jokingly registered himself as "Venya Dyrkin from Maksyutovka" (Веня Ды́ркин из Максютовки; funny-sounding names from an old local joke). Unexpectedly, he won a prize at the festival, and his fake name was shown on big screen, thus becoming his stage name.

D'rkin died of cancer (Hodgkin's lymphoma) on 21 August 1999. Though he was not widely known in his lifetime, he has since obtained a cult following in the Russian-language bard genre. This can be attributed to the fact that before his death, only two of his albums were released, and even those were distributed in only a very small number of copies. He also never played in front of a large audience; most of his public performances were in music festivals and apartment concerts.

A story in song D'rkin had written was posthumously released on CD.
