= Pierre Ranzoni =

French footballer and manager (1921–1999)

Personal information
- Full name: Pierre Victor Ranzoni
- Date of birth: 31 March 1921
- Place of birth: 11th arrondissement of Paris, France
- Date of death: 15 August 1999 (aged 78)
- Place of death: Montpellier, France
- Position: Midfielder

Senior career*
Years	Team	Apps	(Gls)
1941–1944	CA Paris		
1944–1945	Union sportive du Mans		
1945–1947	Stade de Reims		
1947–1948	Red Star		
1948–1950	Stade français-Red Star		
1950–1951	Le Havre		
1952–1954	Rouen		
1954–1955	Mulhouse		

International career
1949–1950	France	2	(0)

Managerial career
- 1954–1955: Mulhouse
- 1956–1957: Fontainebleau
- * Club domestic league appearances and goals

Pierre Victor Ranzoni (31 March 1921 – 15 August 1999) was a French footballer who played as a midfielder for CA Paris, Stade de Reims, Red Star, Le Havre, Rouen in the 1940s and early 1950s. He also played two matches for the French national team in 1949 and 1950.

== Playing career ==
=== Club career ===
Born in 11th arrondissement of Paris on 31 March 1921, Ranzoni began his career at his hometown club CA Paris in 1941, aged 20, from which he joined Union sportive du Mans in 1944. The following season, he signed for Stade de Reims, with whom he played for two years, from 1945 until 1947, scoring 14 goals in 53 official matches, which ended in 27 victories, 12 draws, and 14 losses, helping his side achieve a runner-up finish in the 1946–47 French Division 1. In 1947, he joined Red Star, with whom he played for three years, until 1950, the latter two under the name Stade français-Red Star.

In 1950, Ranzoni moved to Le Havre, where he played for one season, until 1951, and following a one-year hiatus, he signed for Rouen, with whom he played for two years, from 1952 until 1954, scoring 1 goal in three matches in the latter season. He then went to Mulhouse, where he worked as a player-coach in the 1954–55 season. After retiring, he became a coach, overseeing Fontainebleau in the 1956–57 season.

=== International career ===
On 9 October 1949, the 28-year-old Ranzoni made his international debut for France in a 1950 FIFA World Cup qualifier against Yugoslavia, which ended in a 1–1 draw. The following day, the journalists of the French newspaper L'Équipe stated that he "covered a lot of ground, both forward and behind, and he did not miss an opportunity to serve his forwards and help his defenders". He earned his second cap on 10 December 1950, in a friendly match against the Netherlands at Colombes, helping his side to a 5–2 win. The following day, the journalists of L'Équipe described his performance as "discreet to the point of disappearance, basically incognito".

== Death ==
Ranzoni died in Montpellier on 15 August 1999, at the age of 78.

== Honours ==
Stade de Reims

- Ligue 1:
  - Runner-up (1): 1946–47
