= Kauchuk Factory Club =

Coordinates: 55°44′09″N 37°34′25.33″E

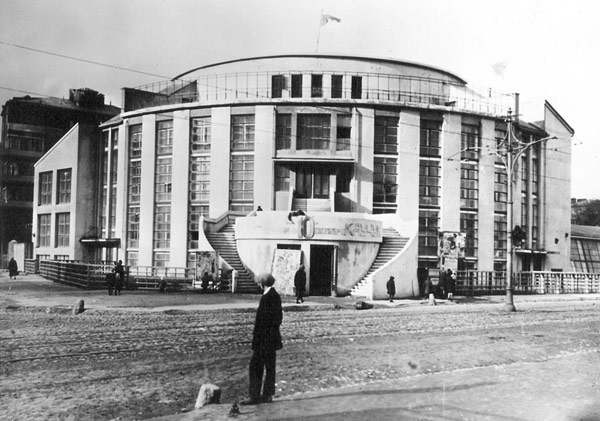
- Melnikov stands in front of Kauchuk Club
- Interactive map of the Kauchuk Factory Club area

General information
- Architectural style: russian avant-garde
- Location: Moscow, Russia
- Construction started: 1927
- Completed: 1929
- Client: Chemists' Trade Union

Design and construction
- Architect: Konstantin Melnikov

Kauchuk Factory Club (Russian: Клуб завода «Каучук») is a 1927-1929 russian avant-garde public building designed by Konstantin Melnikov, located in Khamovniki District of Moscow, Russia on the edge of Devichye Pole park and medical campus at 64, Plyshikha Street.

== History and architecture ==
Kauchuk rubber factory, originally based in Riga, relocated to Khamovniki in Moscow in 1915, threatened by German offensive, and was considerably expanded afterwards. Construction of a club was part of a 1920s nationwide drive to replace religion with more appropriate entertainment. Melnikov theorized that "Club is not a stern temple of some deity. We must attain such an atmosphere, that we would not need to drag a worker in. He would run there himself, past his home and past his pub... the club, if it succeeds, will show what the new private life is all about" (Russian: Клуб – не строгий храм какого-то божества. В нем нужно добиться такой обстановки, чтоб рабочего в клуб не тащить, а он сам бы бежал в него мимо дома и пивной… клуб должен, если сумеет, показать, как устроен новый быт).

== Preservation ==
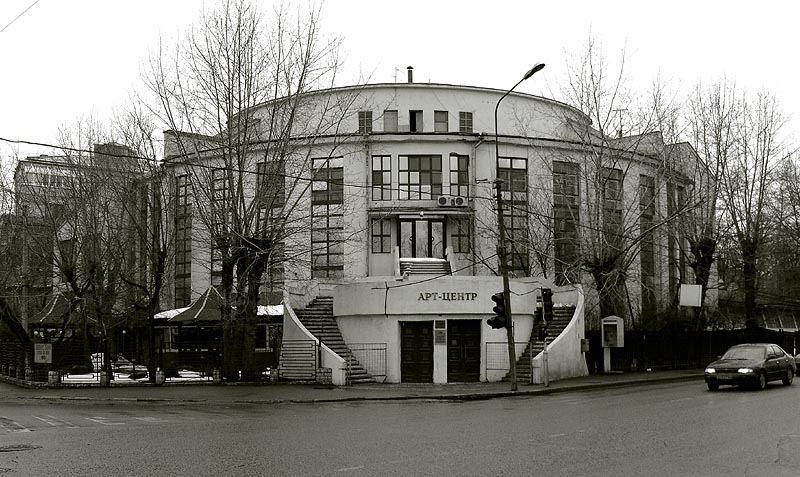
2007 photograph

The club, like all 1920s buildings, is under threat of demolition. As of March, 2007, preservationists succeeded to delay demolition. The building operates a night club and a restaurant, and is in adequate external condition; huge neon lettering that existed in 2003, has been removed. However, its interiors are lost to indiscriminate renovation, original windows are replaced with improperly-sized modern frames. According to Russian press, the building is operated by "Academy of Russian Art", established by pianist Nikolai Petrov.
