= Ramón Lavín =

Spanish swimmer

Personal information
- Born: 23 March 1962
- Died: 3 August 1999 (aged 37)

Sport
- Sport: Swimming

Ramón Lavín (23 March 1962 – 3 August 1999) was a Spanish swimmer who competed in the 1980 Summer Olympics.
