= Anton Alberts (architect) =

Dutch architect

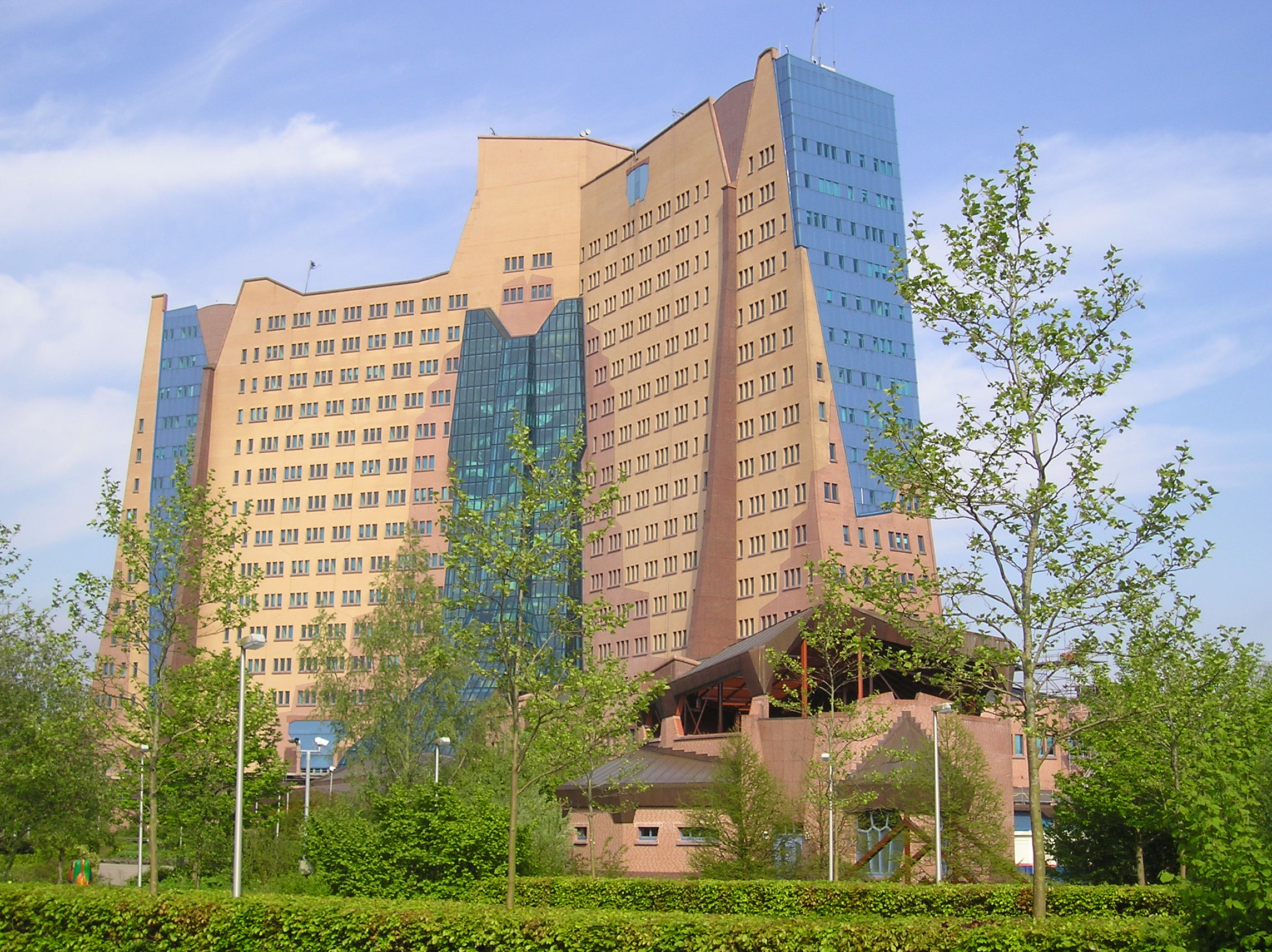
Head office of Gasunie in Groningen

Anton (Ton) Alberts (6 July 1927 – 16 August 1999) was a Dutch architect best known for designing the ING Bank (1982) in the Bijlmer district of Amsterdam and the Gas Corporation headquarters in Groningen.

Alberts was involved with Situationist International before being expelled in 1960. He had been involved with fellow Situationists Constant and Har Oudejans in setting up a labyrinth in the Stedelijk Museum of Amsterdam, but the project fell apart amidst acrimony. Officially, he was expelled for designing churches, although Asger Jorn relates the expulsion more to the "Amsterdam affair".

In 1963 he founded the firm Alberts and Van Huut with Max van Huut, guided by the principles of organic architecture. His work also has its roots in the anthroposophical architecture of Rudolf Steiner.

Alberts offered to work for free on the Peace Parks in Bosnia and Herzegovina but was only able to create sketches before he died, aged 72, in Amsterdam. Still, by Albert's sketches the Peace Flame House, a community centre, was built in Tuzla, Bosnia and Herzegovina, as a gift by Peace Flame Foundation Netherlands to this former war-ravaged community.

Het Zandkasteel (The Sand Castle), formerly ING-Building, Amsterdam Zuidoost (1987)

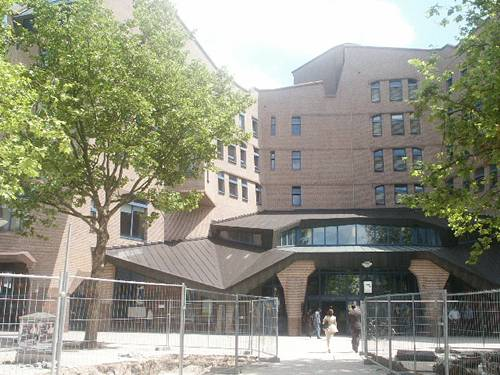
Hoofdingang Bijlmerplein

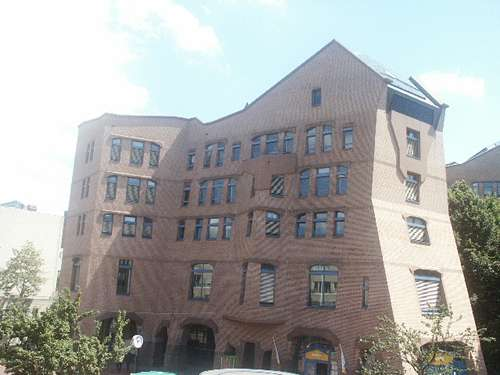
Amsterdamse Poort

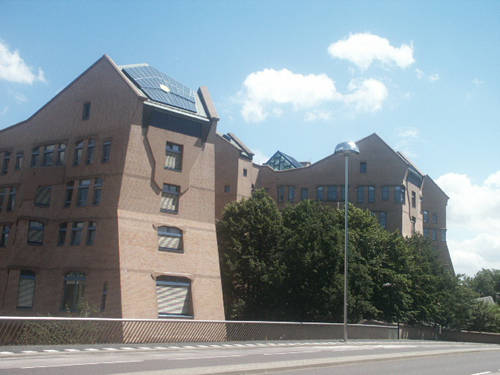
Bijlmerdreef
