= Carlos Iturri =

Peruvian fencer

Personal information
- Born: 7 May 1917
- Died: 23 August 1999 (aged 82)

Sport
- Sport: Fencing

Carlos Iturri (7 May 1917 – 23 August 1999) was a Peruvian fencer. He competed in the individual épée event at the 1948 Summer Olympics.
