= Rusakov Workers' Club =

Constructivist building in Moscow, Russia

Coordinates: 55°47′29″N 37°41′14″E

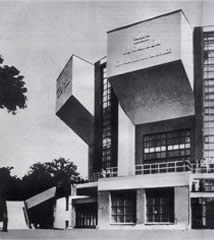
Rusakov club by Konstantin Melnikov

The Rusakov Workers' Club (Russian: Дом культуры имени И.В.Русакова (рабочий клуб)) in Moscow is a notable example of constructivist architecture. Designed by Konstantin Melnikov, and named after Ivan Vasilyevich Rusakov (1877–1921), Russian medical doctor and revolutionary, it was constructed in 1927–28. The club is built on a fan-shaped plan, with three cantilevered concrete seating areas rising above the base. Each of these volumes can be used as a separate auditorium, and combined they result in a capacity of over 1,000 people. At the rear of the building are more conventional offices. The only visible materials used in its construction are concrete, brick and glass. The function of the building is to some extent expressed in the exterior, which Melnikov described as a "tensed muscle".

== Preservation ==
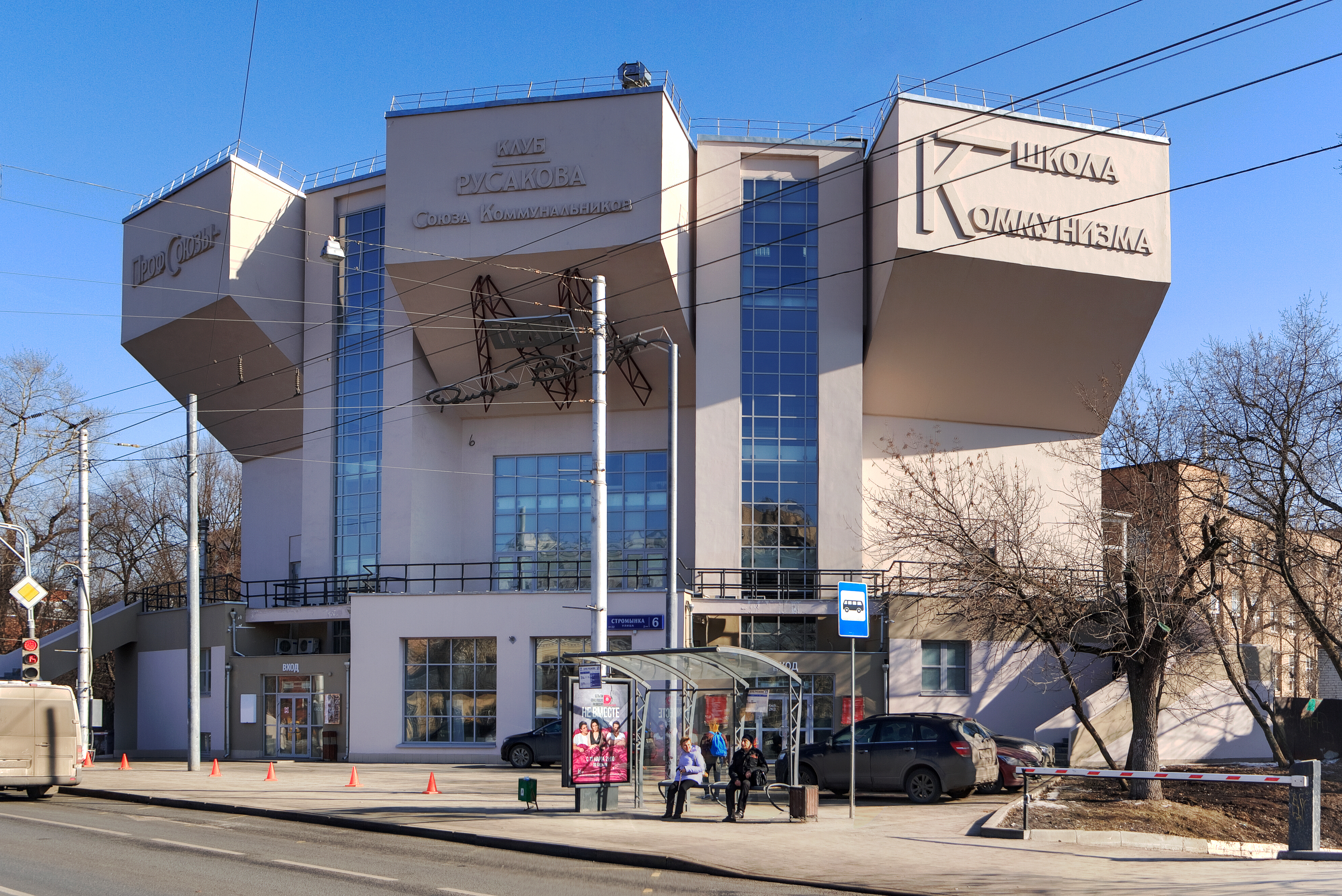
The building, in 2017

The building was included in the 1998 World Monuments Watch by the World Monuments Fund to call attention to its very poor condition. According to the Fund the roof and foundations had weakened, the columns were in need of reinforcement, and brick walls were cracking.

The site was listed again in the 2000 World Monuments Watch. With a grant from American Express, the World Monuments Fund provided a much-needed replacement roof for the building in 1999. The project was overseen by the Moscow Committee for Monuments Protection, which provided additional funds.

In 2005 a commemorative coin (3 ruble, silver) was issued by the Central Bank of Russia, featuring the Rusakov Workers' Club building.

In 2015 the building reopened after a refurbishment that provided practical upgrades, and restored some original features, such as windows in the sides of the projecting auditorium volumes and signage, while changing or not restoring other elements. It remains in use as a theatre and cultural centre.
