= Bakhmetevsky Bus Garage =

Coordinates: 55°47′21″N 37°36′28″E

- "Бахметьевский автогараж"
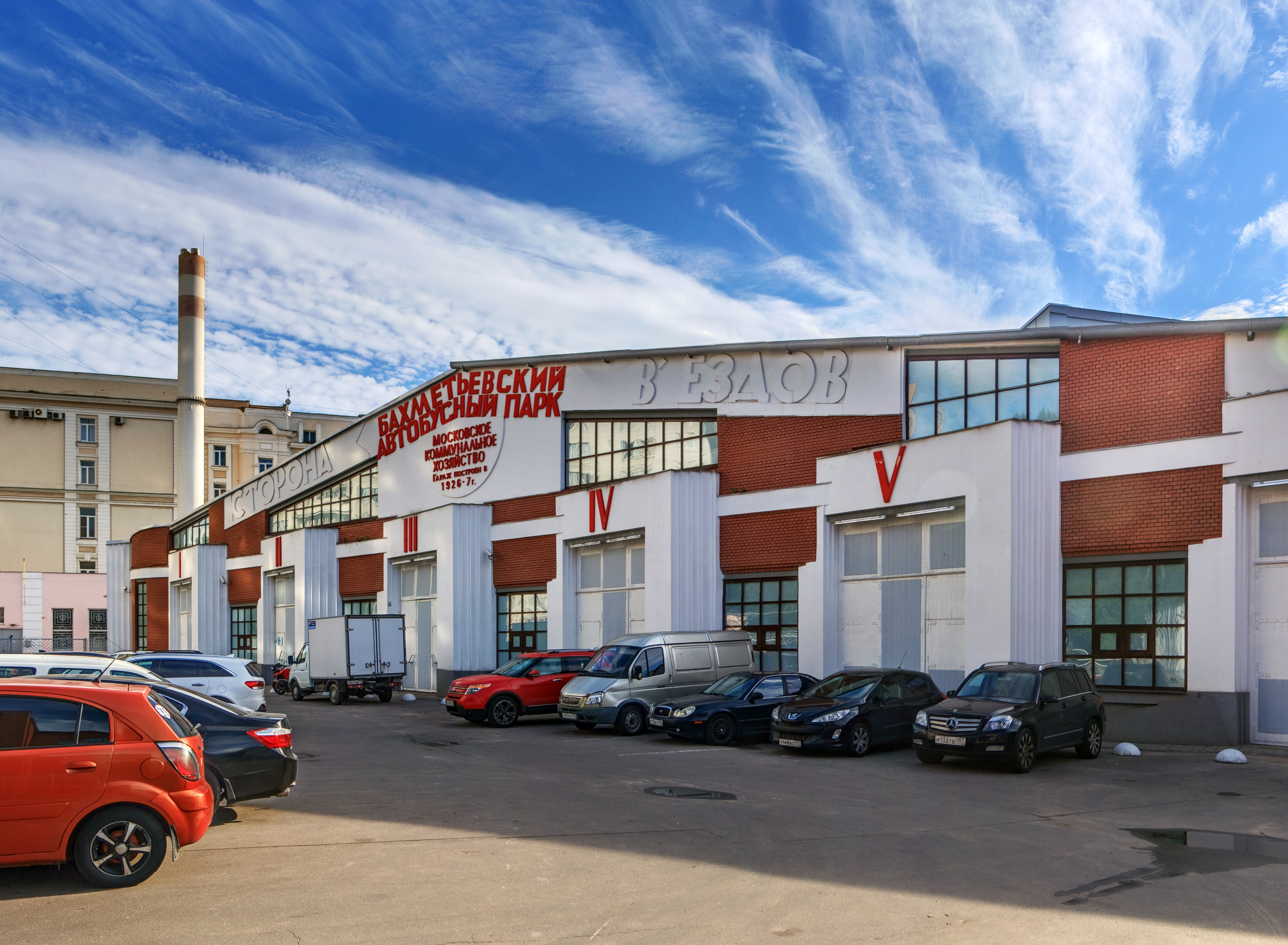

General information
- Type: Bus depot
- Location: Moscow, Russia
- Completed: 1927

Design and construction
- Architects: Konstantin Melnikov, Vladimir Shukhov

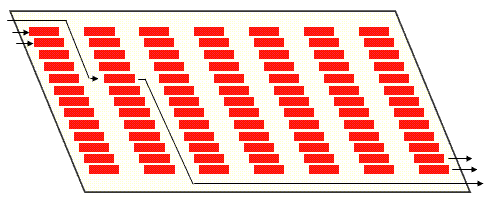
Melnikov's concept of free-flow garage layout

Bakhmetevsky Bus Garage was a public bus garage in Moscow, designed in 1926 by Konstantin Melnikov (floorplan concept and architectural design) and Vladimir Shukhov (structural engineering). The building, completed in 1927, was an example of applying avant-garde architectural methods to an industrial facility. Neglected for decades and nearly condemned to demolition, it was restored in 2007–2008 and reopened in September 2008 as a gallery of modern art.

== Original design ==
In 1925, Melnikov travelled to Paris. Back in Moscow, Melnikov saw a new fleet of Leyland buses tucked into a narrow yard in Bolshaya Ordynka Street. He approached city transportation board and sold his idea for a free-flow garage. It was built on a large lot in Bakhmetevskaya Street, 11 (then a working class suburb north from Garden Ring; later, the street was renamed Obraztsova Street). Bakhmetevsky Garage, sometimes associated with constructivist architecture, was in fact styled in an indefinite red-brick industrial livery; circular windows in the attic are the only avant-garde features (and even these were destroyed decades ago).

=== Later development ===
Melnikov also designed workshops and office buildings on the same lot, filling the irregular voids made by placing a parallelogram-shaped garage on a larger, rectangular lot.

=== Preservation attempts ===
In 1990, the aging garage was listed as an architectural memorial. In 2001, the bus company vacated the building and the City Hall donated it to the Moscow Hasidic Jewish Community Center

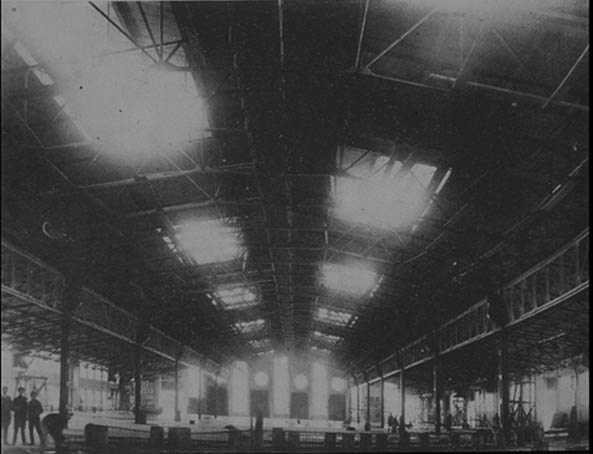
Interior of the Bakhmetevsky Bus Garage. Structural design by Vladimir Shukhov; floorplan layout by Konstantin Melnikov. 1929, Moscow

for redevelopment, on condition that the Community Center build a public school on the same lot and return it to the City. The Community Center approached architect Alexey Vorontsov to design the whole project.
