= Sibrevcom Street, Novosibirsk =

Street in Novosibirsk, Russia

Sibrevcom Street
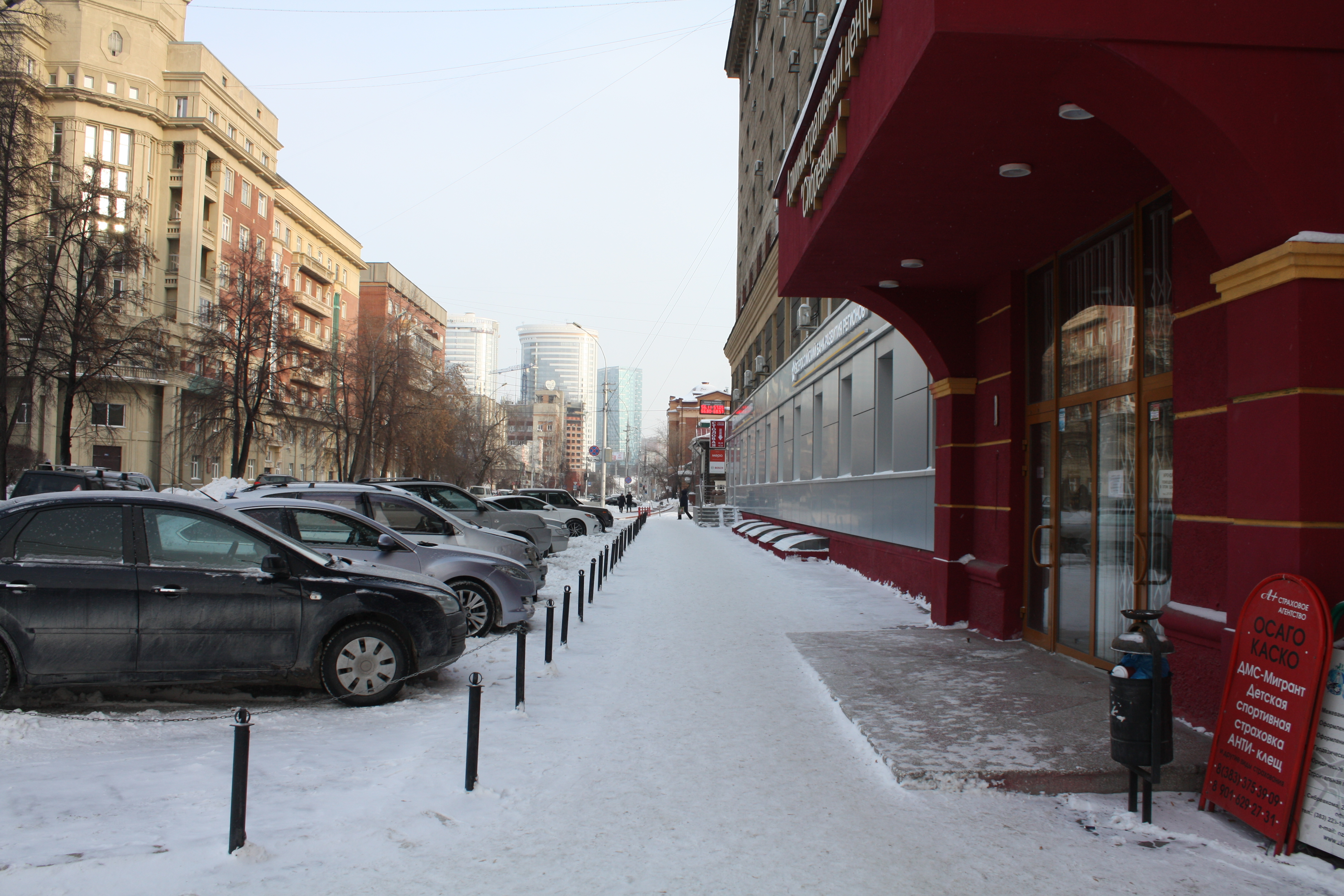
- Interactive map of Sibrevcom Street
- Native name: Улица Сибревкома (Russian)
- Location: Novosibirsk; Russia

Sibrevcom Street (Russian: Улица Сибревкома) is a west–east street in Tsentralny City District of Novosibirsk, Russia. It runs from a T-intersection with Krasny Avenue, crosses Serebrennikovskaya Street and ends near the Sibrevcomovsky Bridge over Ippodromskaya Street.

== History ==
The street was previously called the Voznesenskaya Street, but was renamed in 1924.

== Architecture ==
- Vykhodsev House. The building was built in 1911.
- School No. 12 is a school on the corner of Sibrevcom and Serebrennikovskaya streets. It was built in 1912. Architect: A. D. Kryachkov.
- Nikitin House. The building was built in 1915.
- 100-Flat Building is a building on the corner of Krasny Avenue and Sibrevcom Street. It was built in 1937. Architects: A. D. Krychkov, V. S. Maslennikov. At the Exposition Internationale des Arts et Techniques dans la Vie Moderne in Paris on December 11, 1937, the project was awarded the 1st degree diploma, a gold medal, and a Grand Prix.
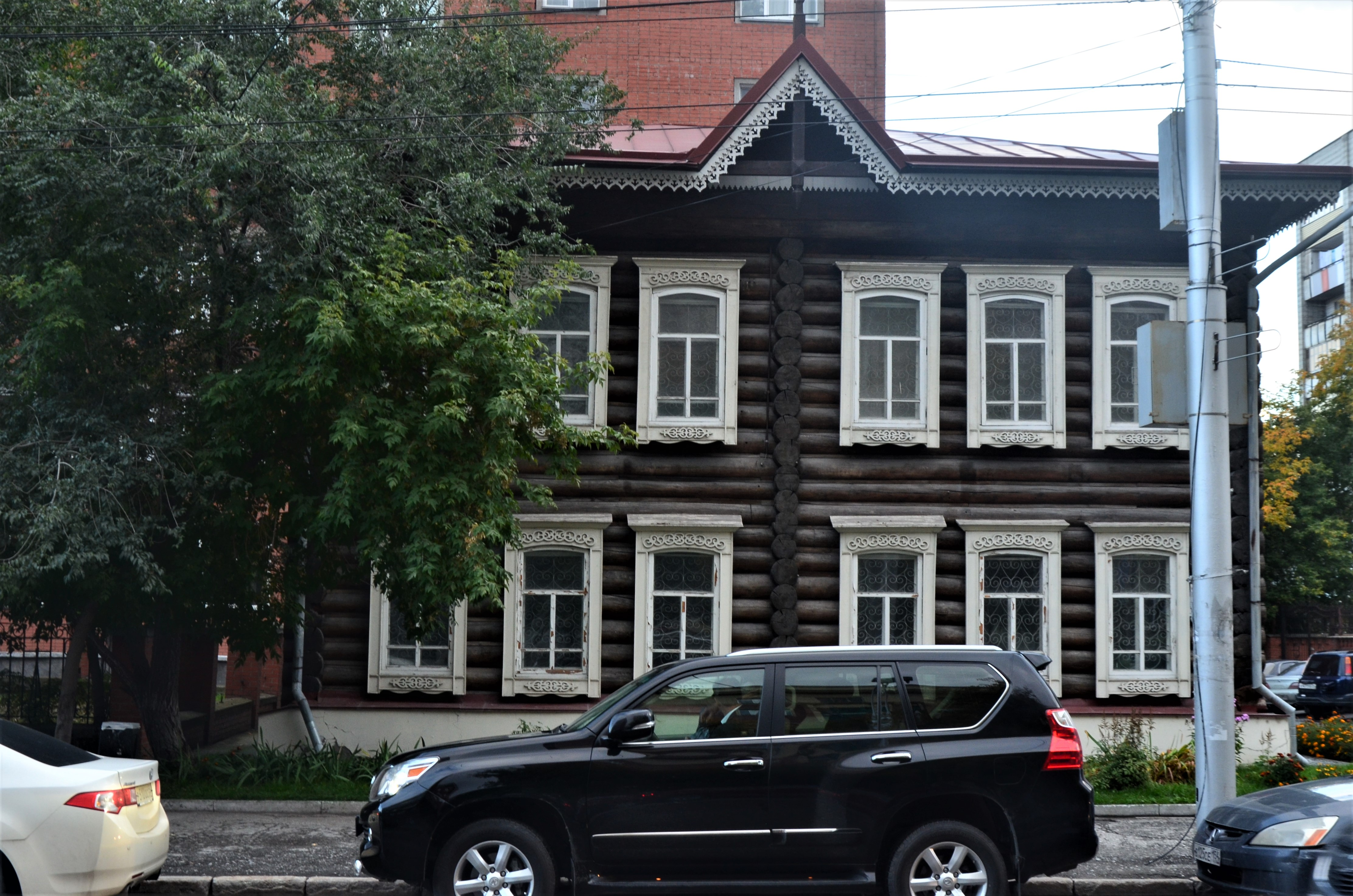
Vykhodsev House

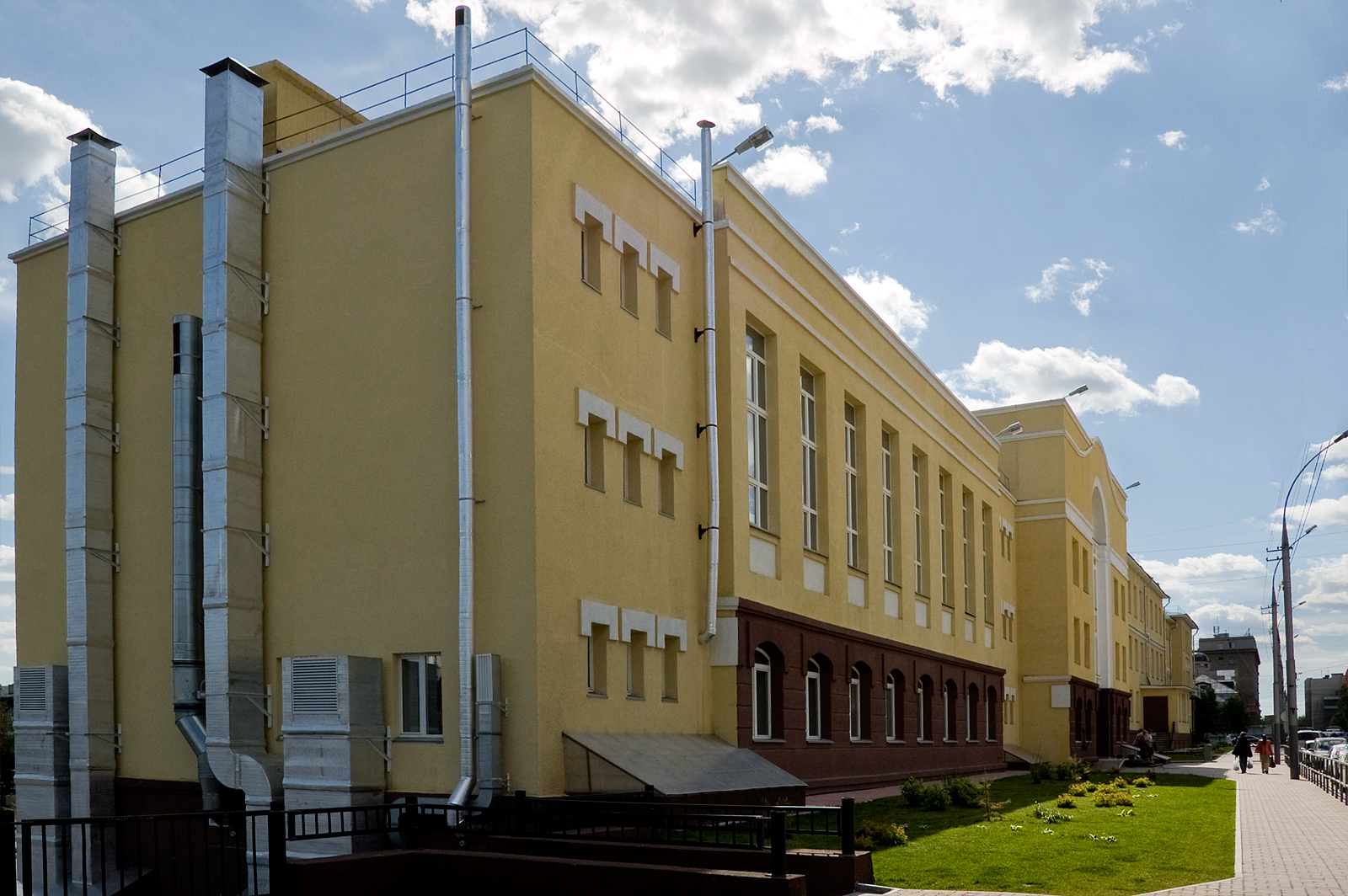
School No. 12

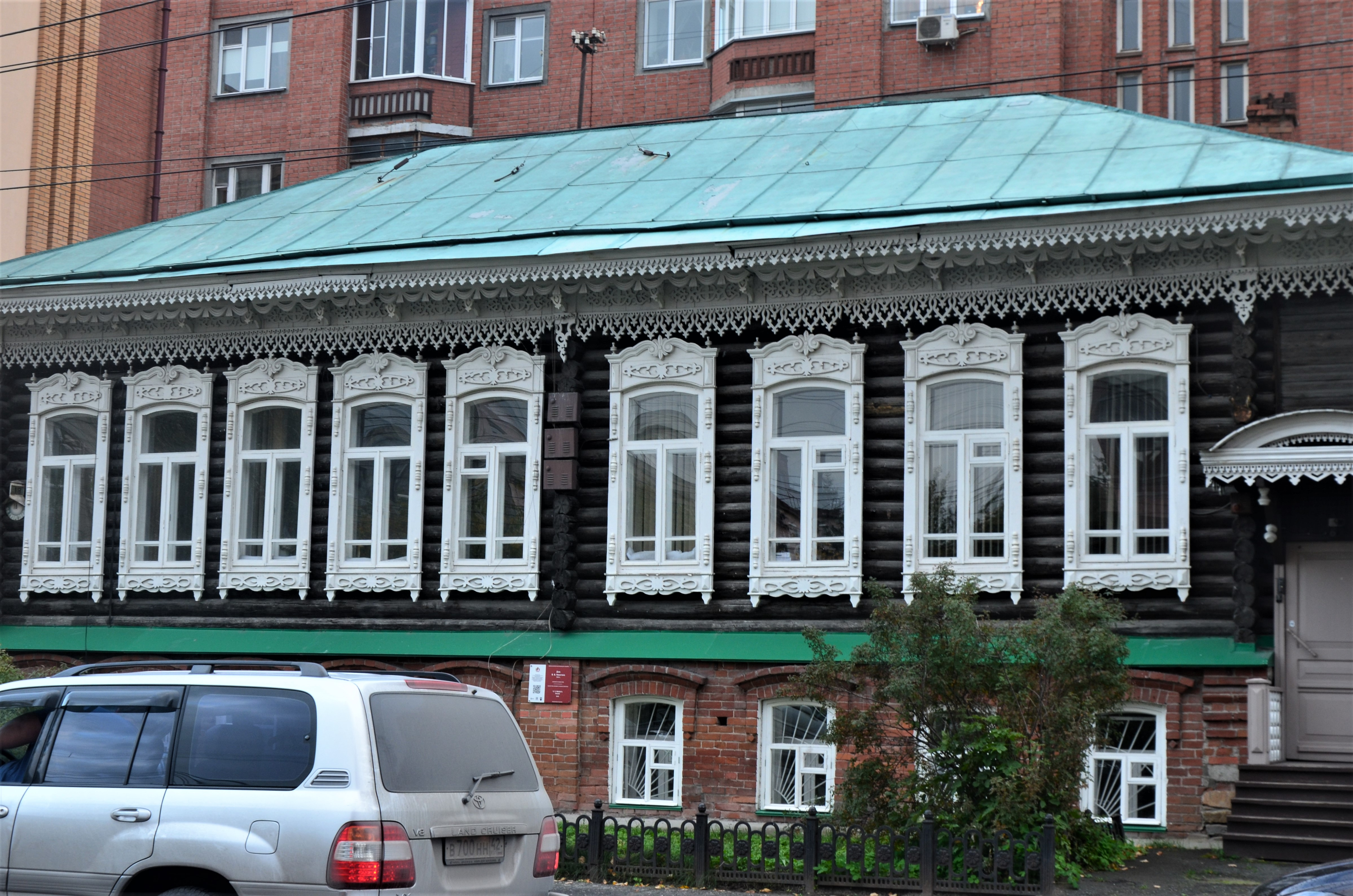
Nikitin House

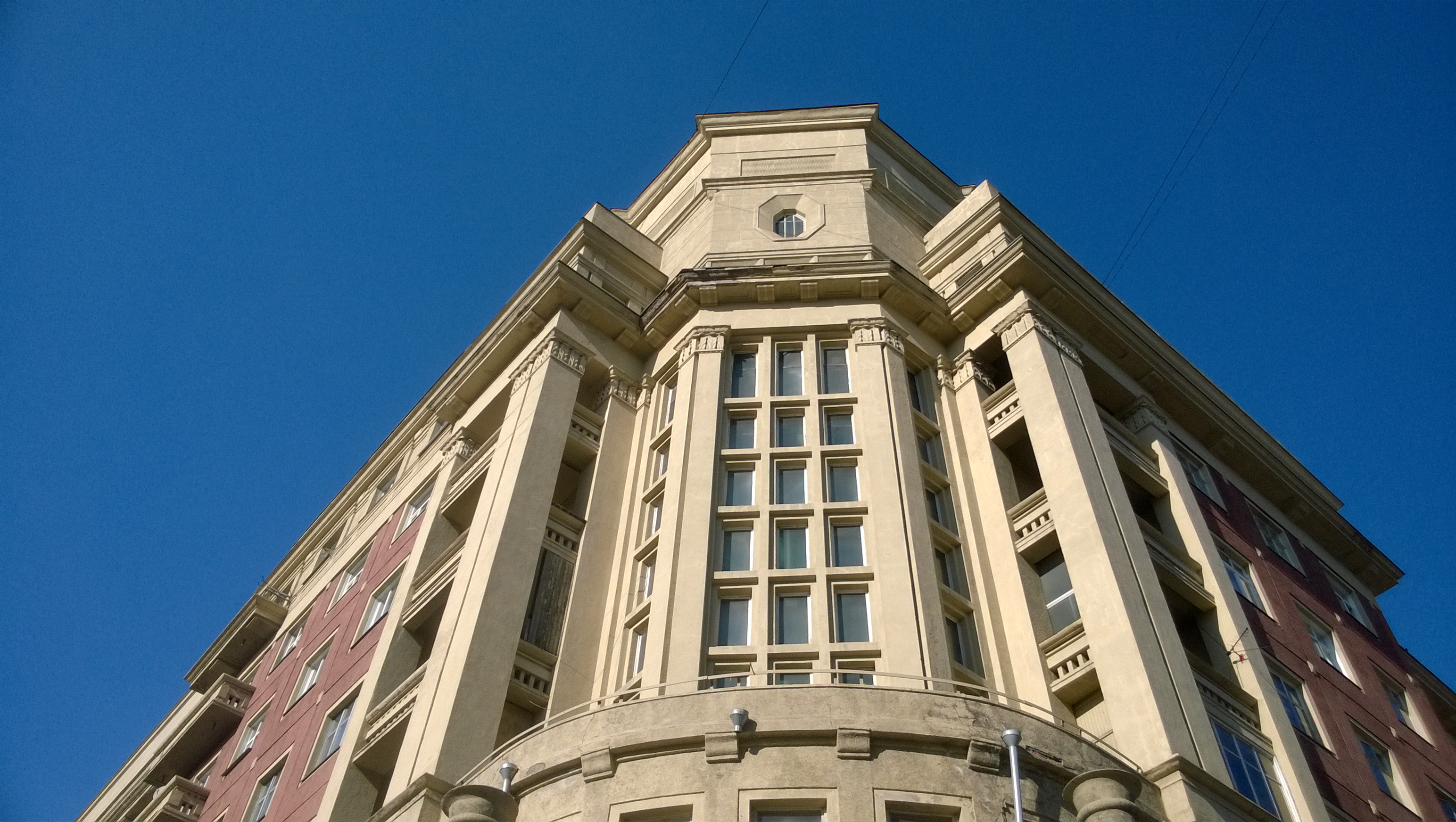
100-Flat Building

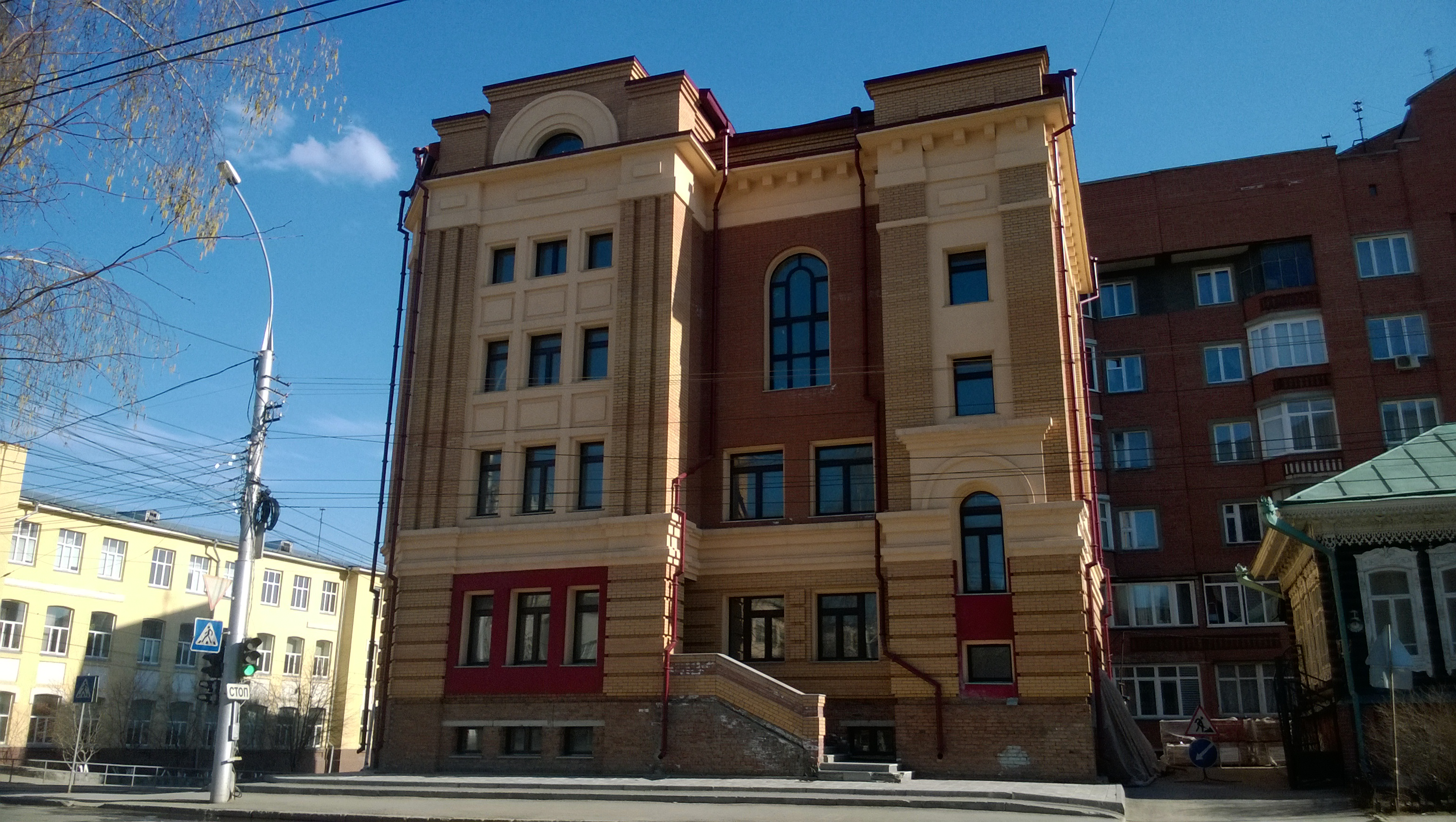

== Gallery ==
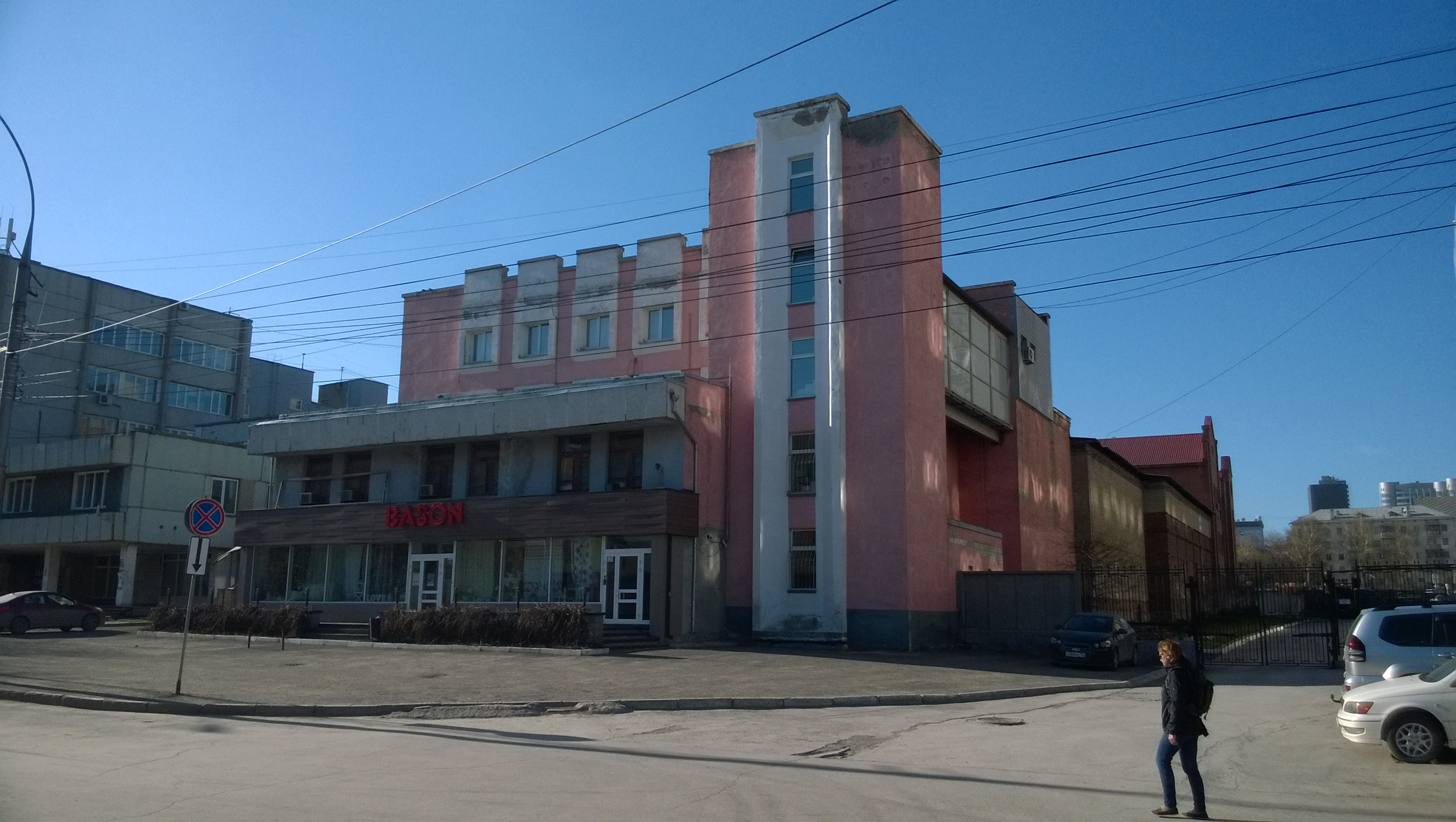

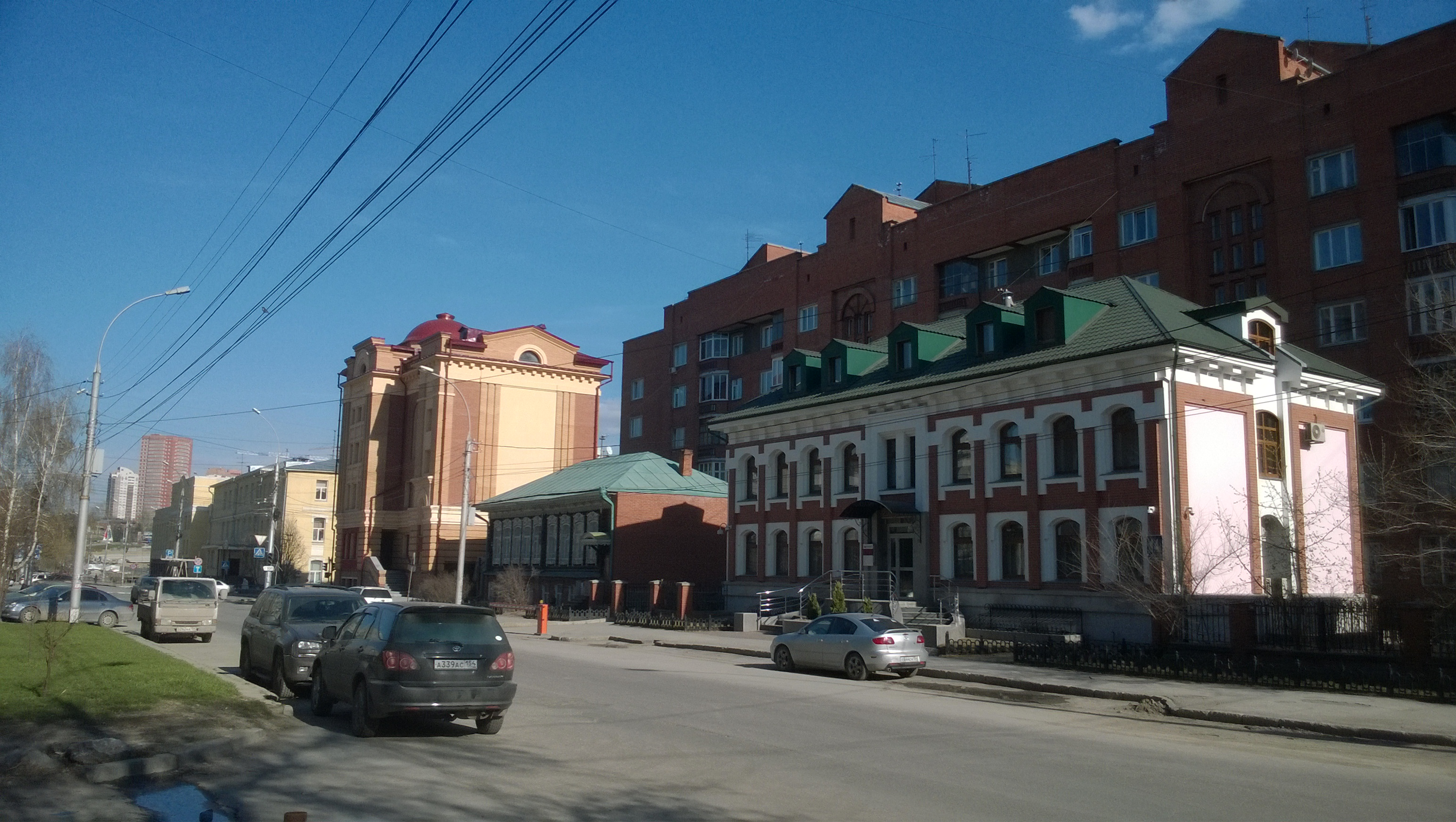

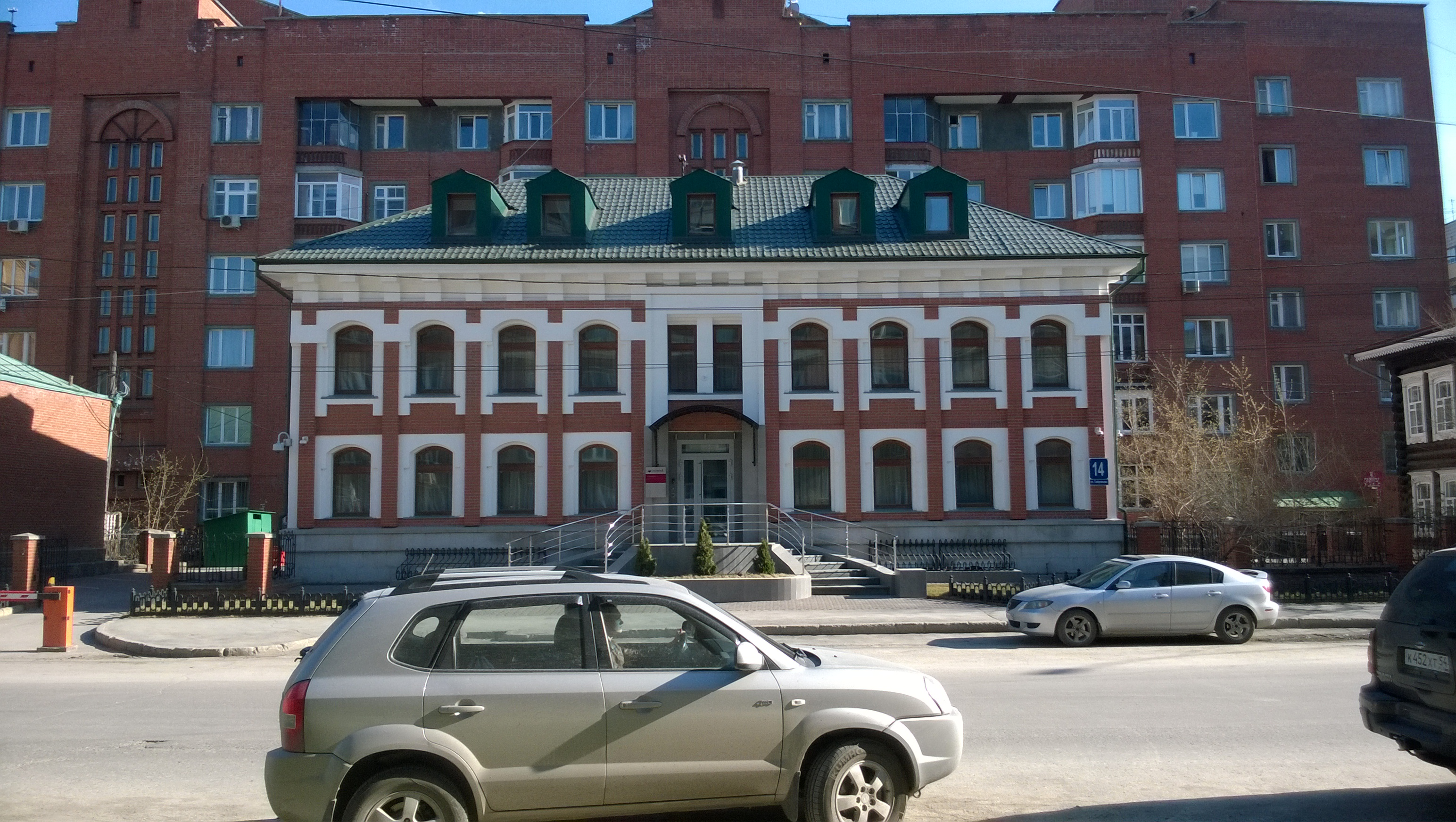

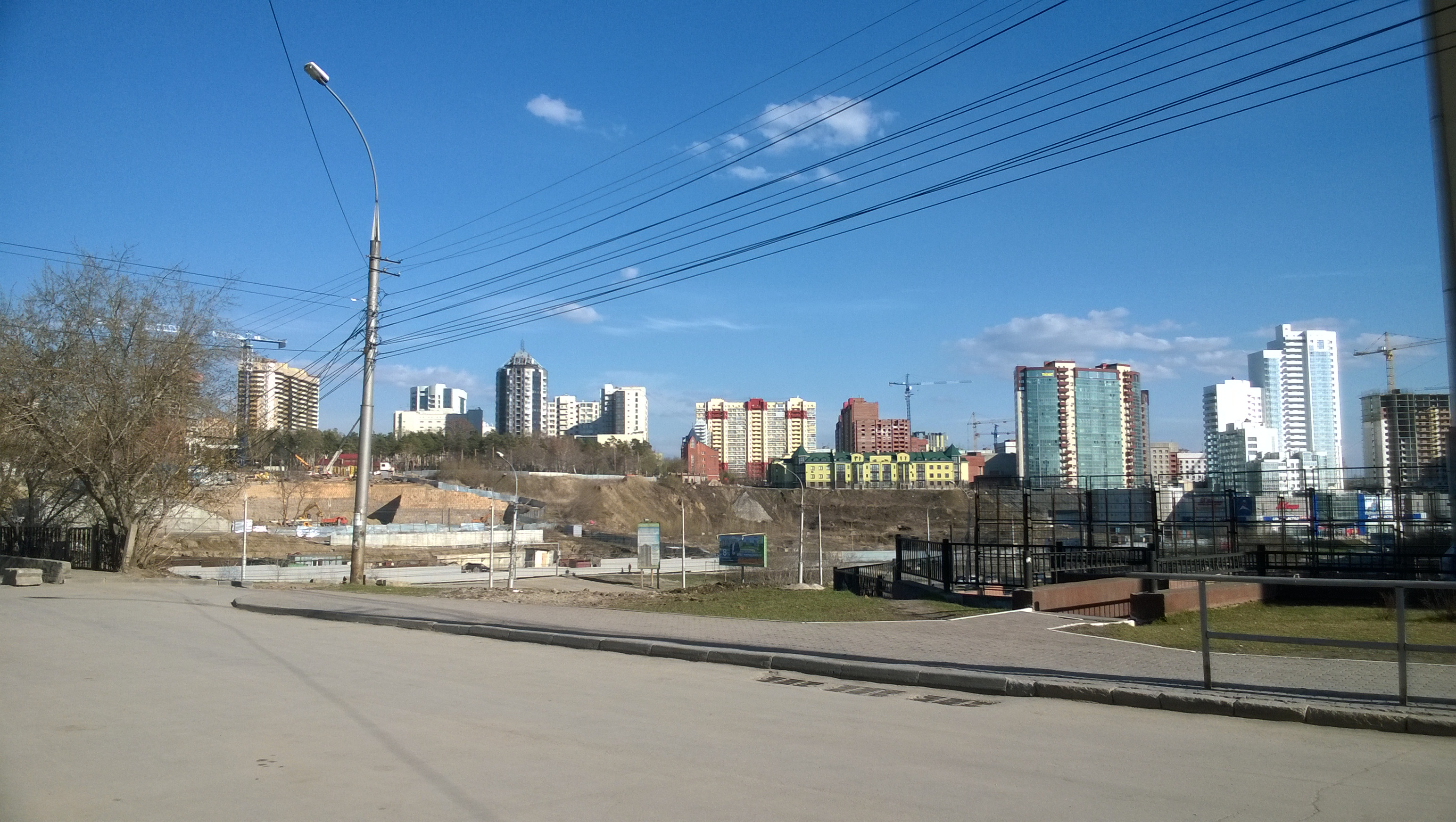

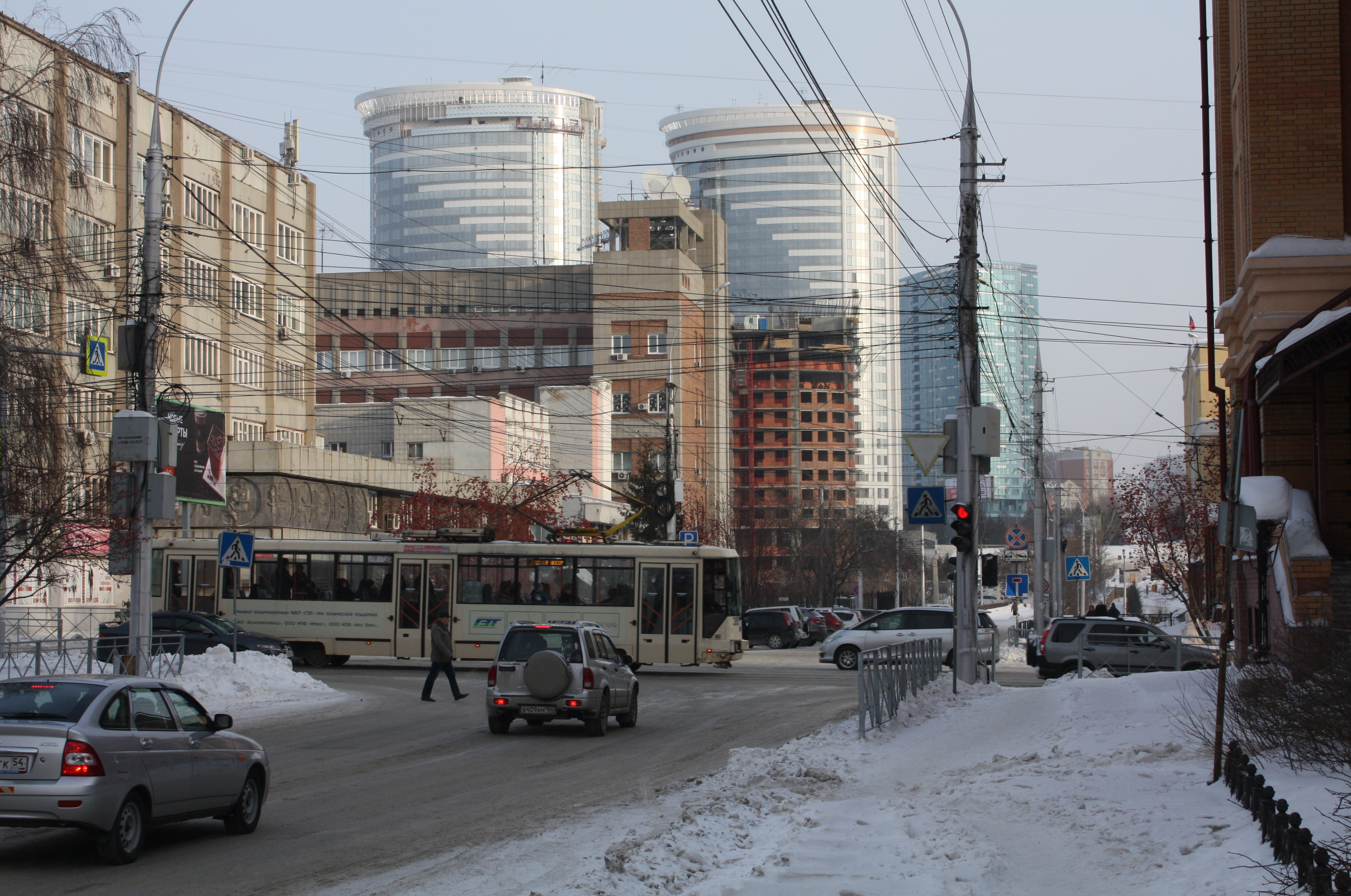

== Organizations ==
- Sinar Garment Factory. The company was founded in 1921.
- Sibrechproject is a project organization founded in 1947.
- Siberian Memorial Art Gallery
- Bason Company is a design and sewing company of home textiles.
