= Dinamo Residential Complex =

Building complex in Novosibirsk, Russia

- Жилой комплекс «Динамо»
- Interactive map of the Dinamo Residential Complex area

General information
- Architectural style: constructivism
- Location: Novosibirsk, Russia
- Construction started: 1934
- Completed: 1936

Design and construction
- Architects: B. A. Gordeyev; S. P. Turgenev; V. N. Nikitin

Dinamo Residential Complex (Russian: Жилой комплекс «Динамо») is a constructivist building complex in Tsentralny City District of Novosibirsk, Russia. It is located on the corner of Krasny Avenue and Oktyabrskaya Street. The complex was built in 1934–1936. Architects: Boris Gordeyev, S. P. Turgenev, V. N. Nikitin. It included a hotel and residential buildings for NKVD employees and furthermore a tavern staffed by NKVD employees.

== Description ==
The Dinamo Complex included a hotel, a hairdresser, a kindergarten, a Dynamo Shop, a laundry room, and a residential complex.

=== Hotel ===
The hotel had a restaurant, its staff consisted of NKVD agents. They overheard conversations of restaurant visitors.

=== Residential Complex ===
Residential complex was built for NKVD employees. It consists of two sectors. The first sector was built in 1934, the second sector was constructed in 1936. The apartments had no kitchens, but there was a mechanical cafeteria for the residents of the complex.

== See also ==
- NKVD House (Serebrennikovskaya Street 16)
- NKVD House (Serebrennikovskaya Street 23)
