= Sibrevcomovsky Bridge =

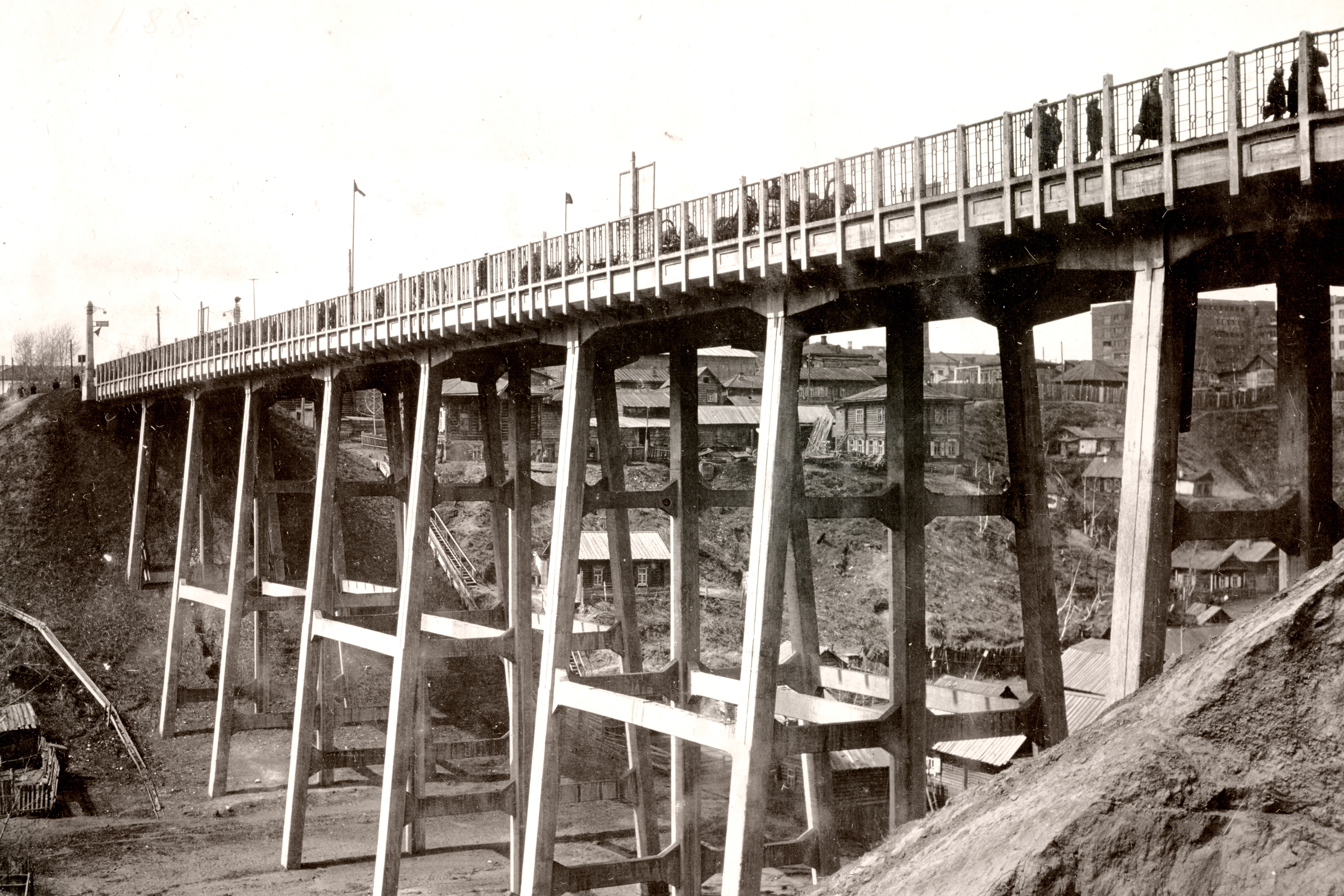
- Coordinates: 55°01′14″N 82°55′50″E
- Crosses: Ippodromskaya Street (previously Kamenka River)
- Locale: Novosibirsk, Russia

History
- Opened: 1926

The Sibrevcomovsky Bridge (Russian: Сибревкомовский мост, Sibrevcomovsky Most) is a pedestrian bridge over the Ippodromskya Street, connecting the Tsentralny and Oktyabrsky districts of Novosibirsk, Russia. It was opened on November 7, 1926 by architect M. A. Ulianinsky. Previously, it was a road bridge.

Initially, it crossed the Kamenka River, but then the river was enclosed in a tunnel.

== Bridge name ==
The bridge is named after Sibrevcom Street.

== History ==
The Sibrevcomovsky Bridge was constructed from May 1925 to November 1926.

Until the 1960s, it was a dangerous place. Frequent robberies occurred on the bridge.

In the 1980s, the bridge became a pedestrian walkway.

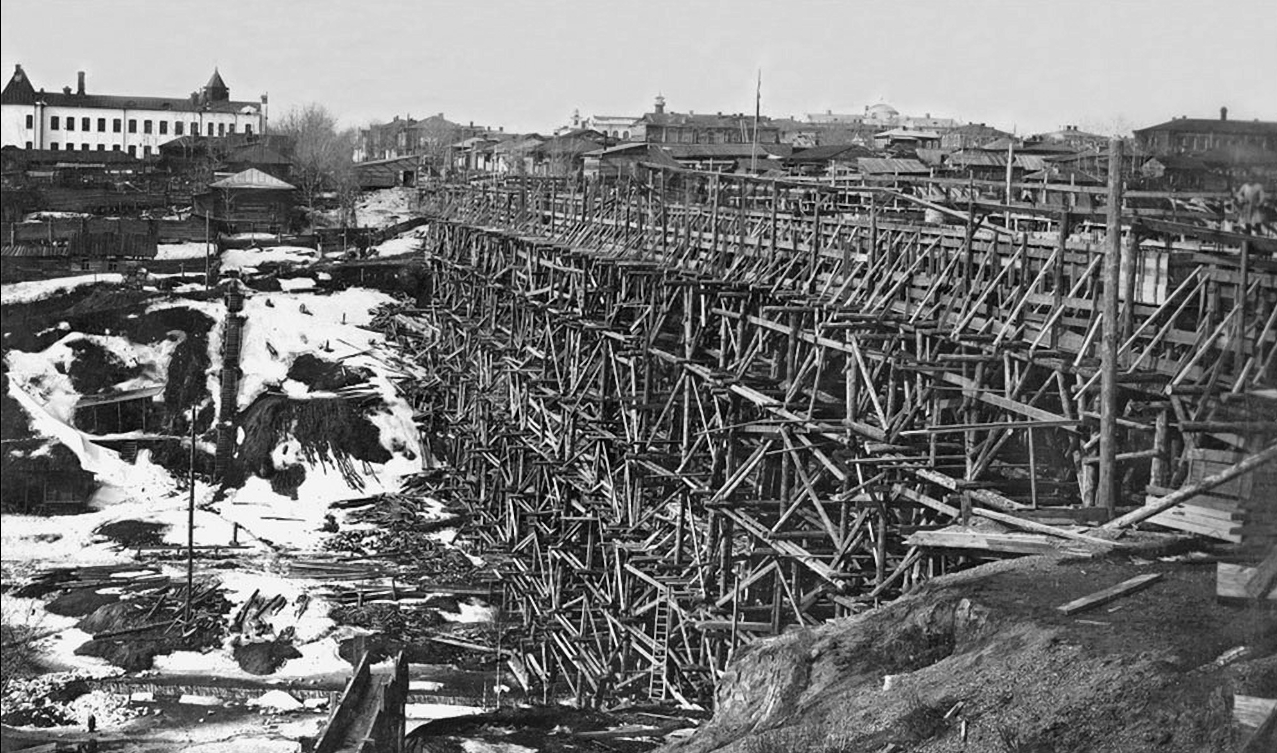
Bridge construction

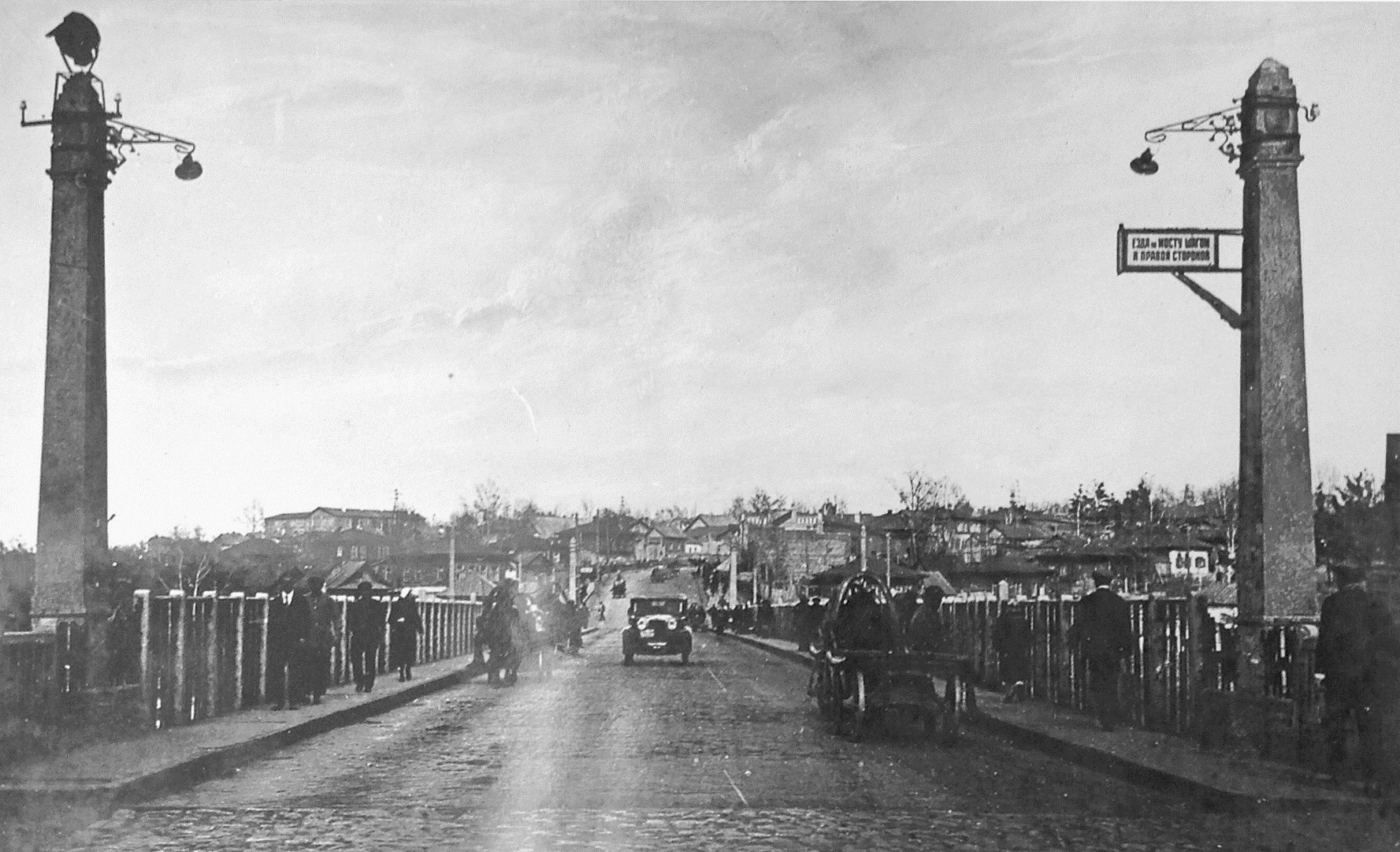
1920s

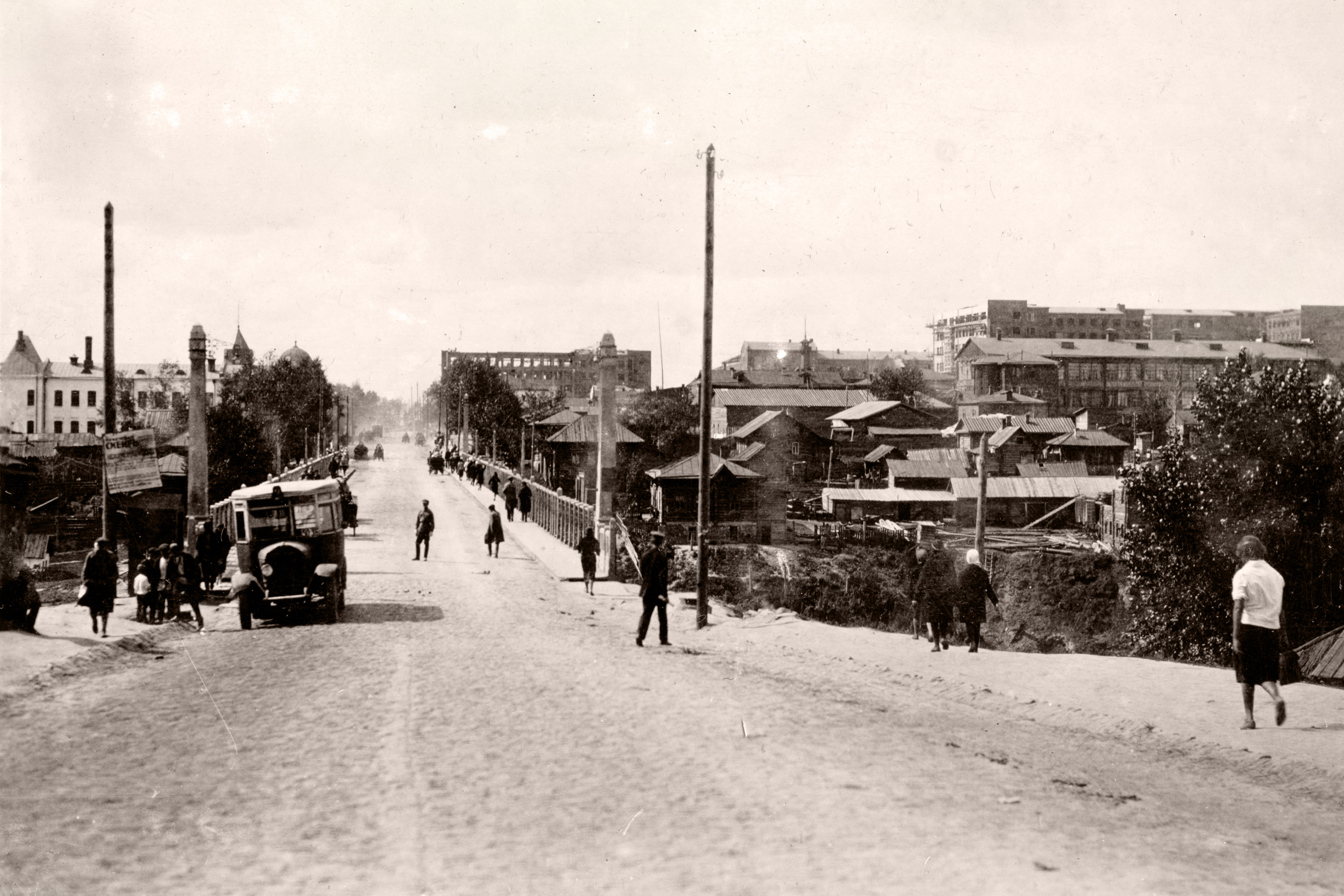
1930s

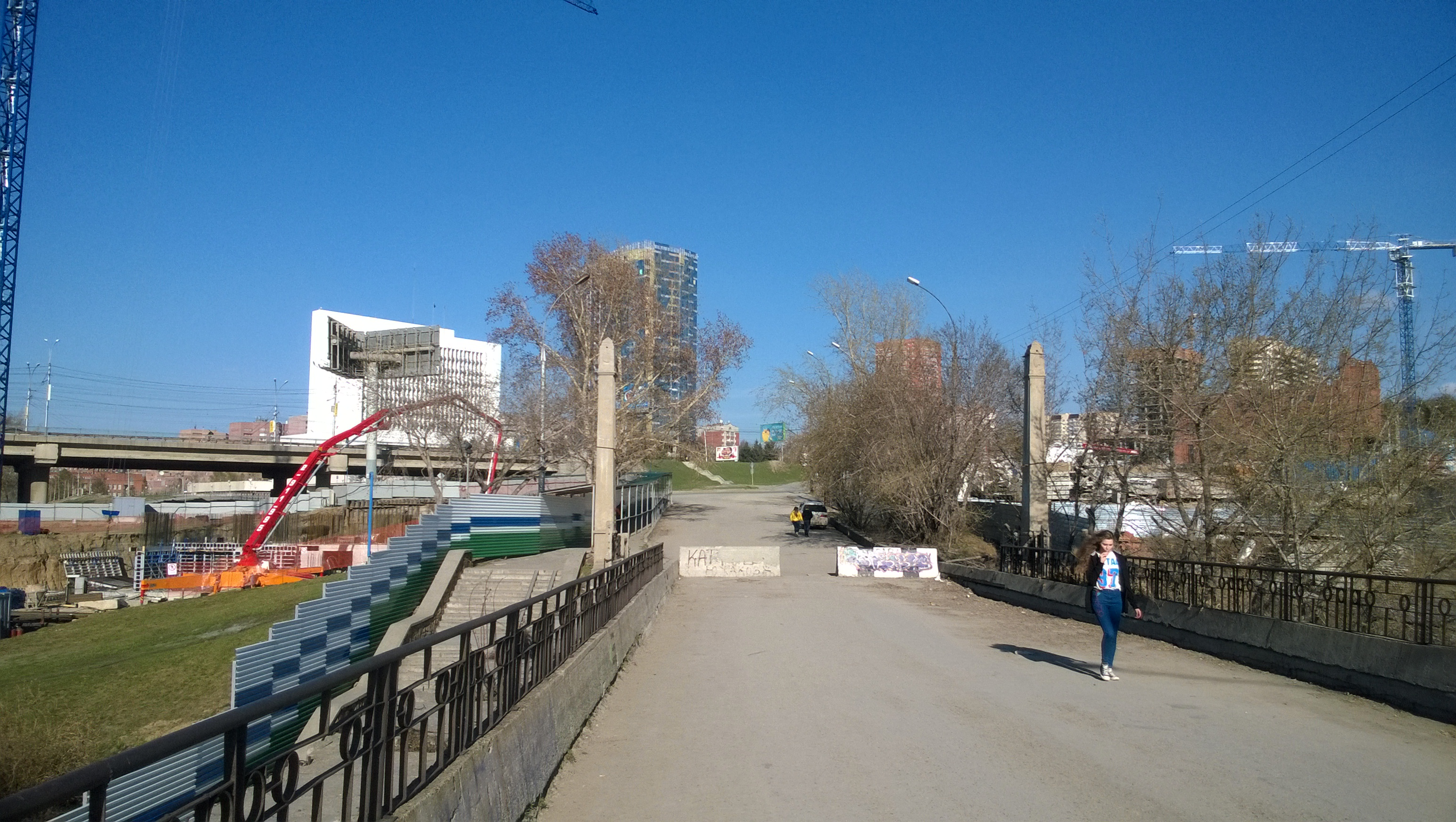
2015
