= NKVD House (Serebrennikovskaya Street 23) =

- Дом-комбинат НКВД
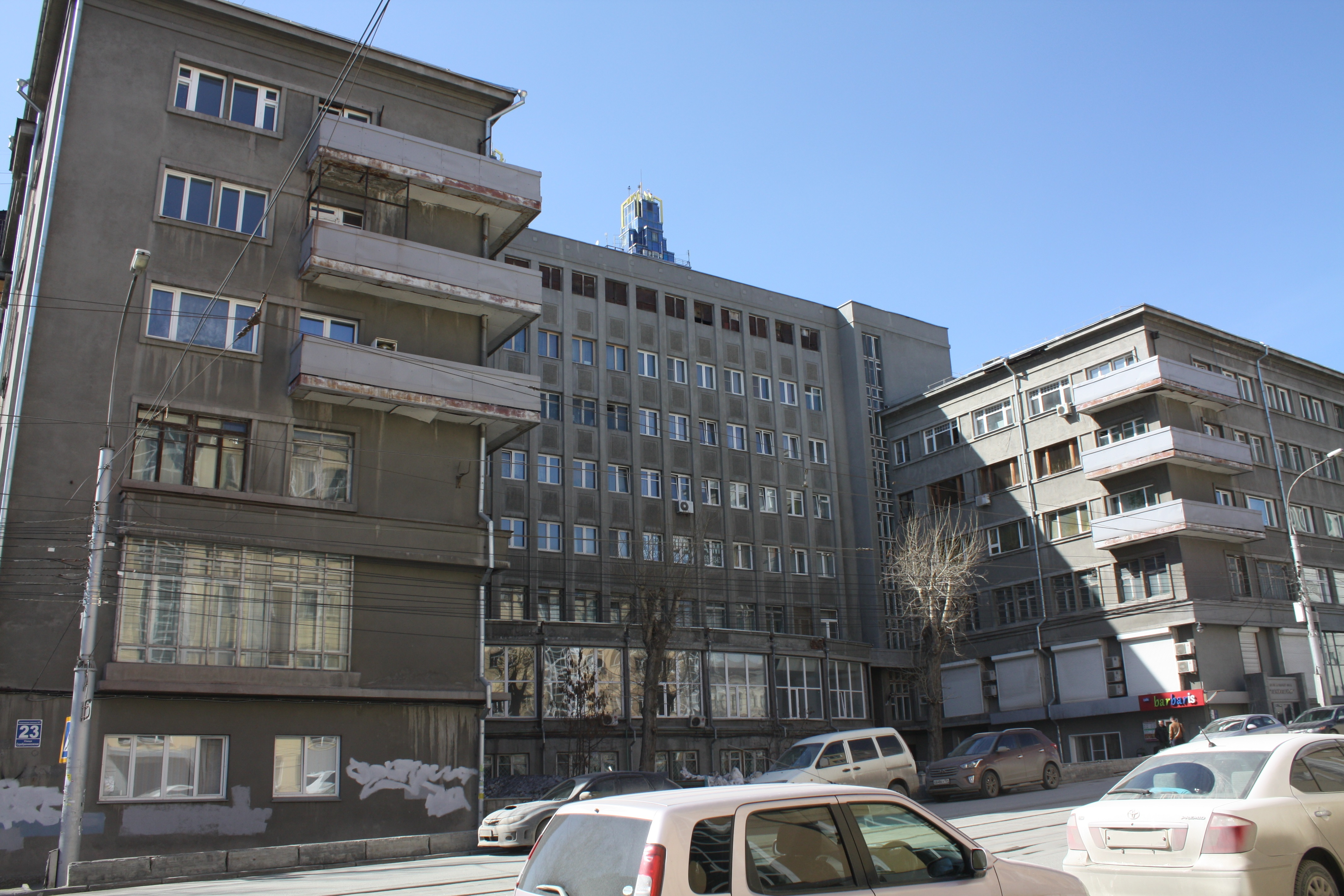
- Interactive map of the NKVD House area

General information
- Architectural style: constructivism
- Location: Novosibirsk, Russia
- Coordinates: 55°01′23″N 82°55′33″E
- Completed: 1936

Design and construction
- Architects: S. P. Turgenev, I. T. Voronov, B. A. Gordeyev

NKVD House is a constructivist building in Tsentralny City District of Novosibirsk, Russia. It was built in 1936. Architects: Sergey Turgenev, Ivan Voronov, Boris Gordeyev.

== History ==
The residential building is located on Serebrennikovskaya Street. It was built for NKVD employees.

== See also ==
- Polyclinic No. 1
- Dinamo Sports Complex
- NKVD House (Serebrennikovskaya Street 16)
