= Serebrennikovskaya Street, Novosibirsk =

Street in Novosibirsk, Russia

Serebrennikovskaya Street
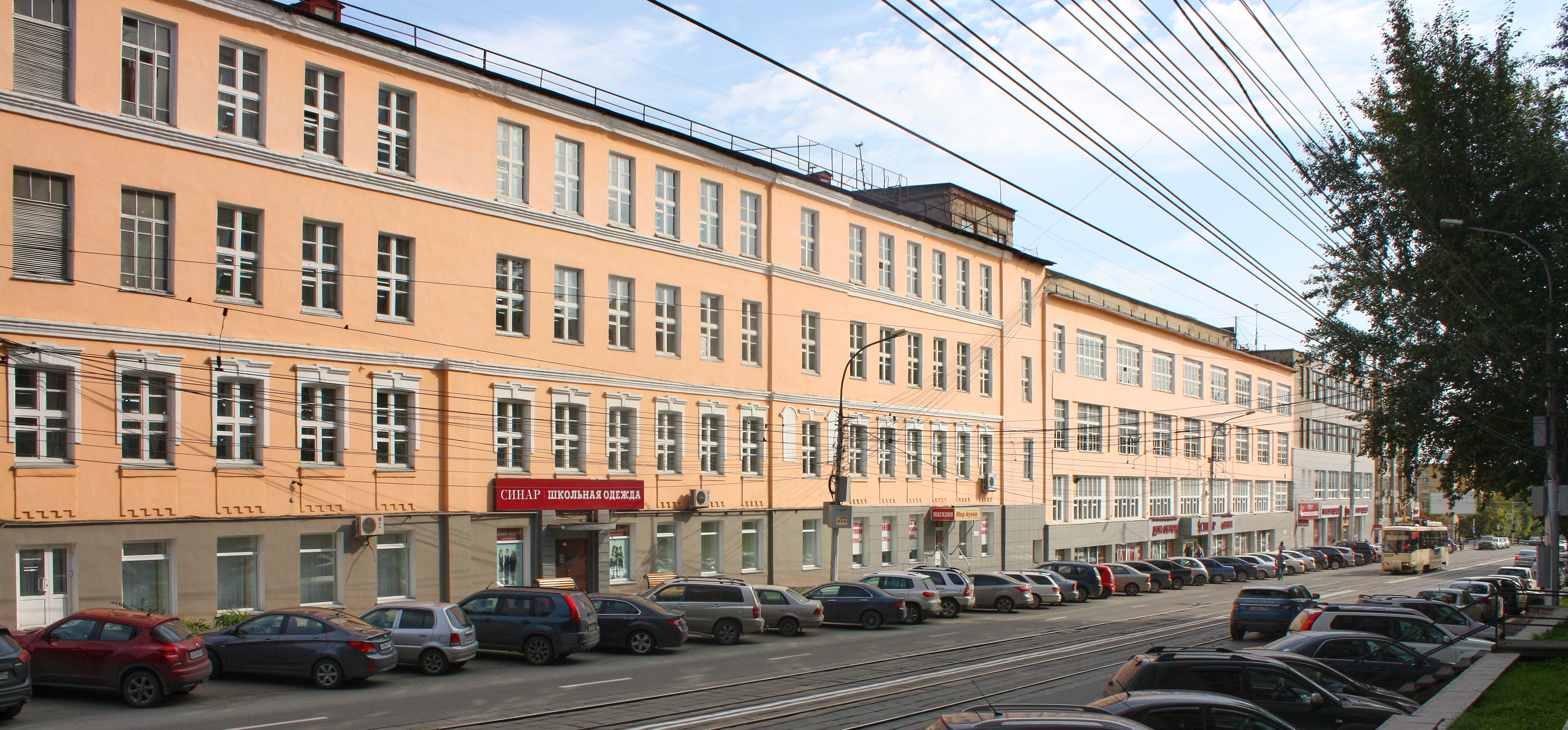
- Native name: Серебренниковская улица (Russian)
- Location: Novosibirsk; Russia

Serebrennikovskaya Street (Russian: Серебренниковская улица) is a street in Tsentralny City District of Novosibirsk, Russia. It runs south-north. The street starts from the Altay Railway Overpass and ends near the southern facade of the Novosibirsk Opera and Ballet Theatre.

== History ==
The street was first called the Alexandrovskaya Street, but was renamed in 1920 for Fyodor Serebrennikov, Russian revolutionary.

== Gallery ==
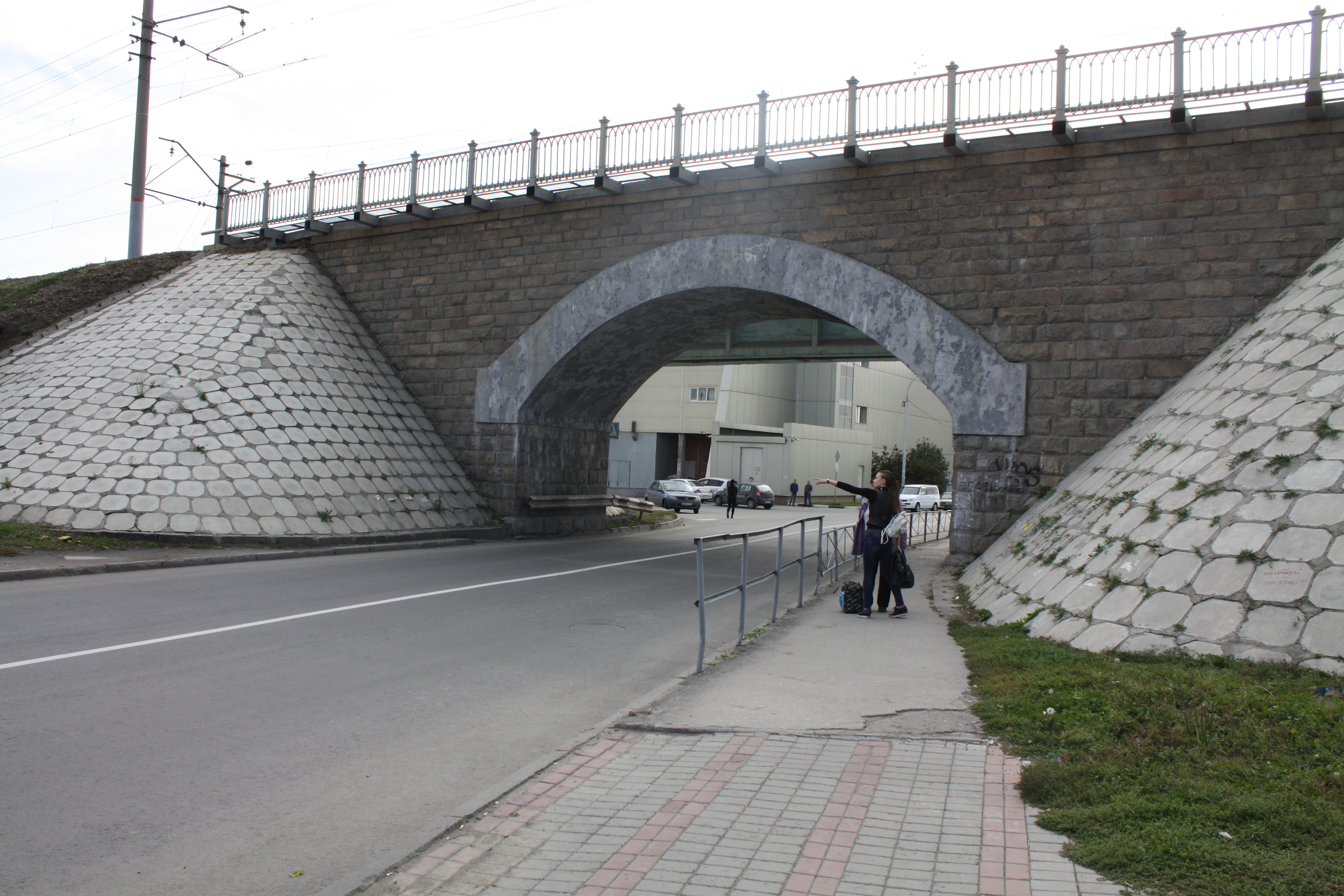
Altay Railway Overpass, The Street Beginning

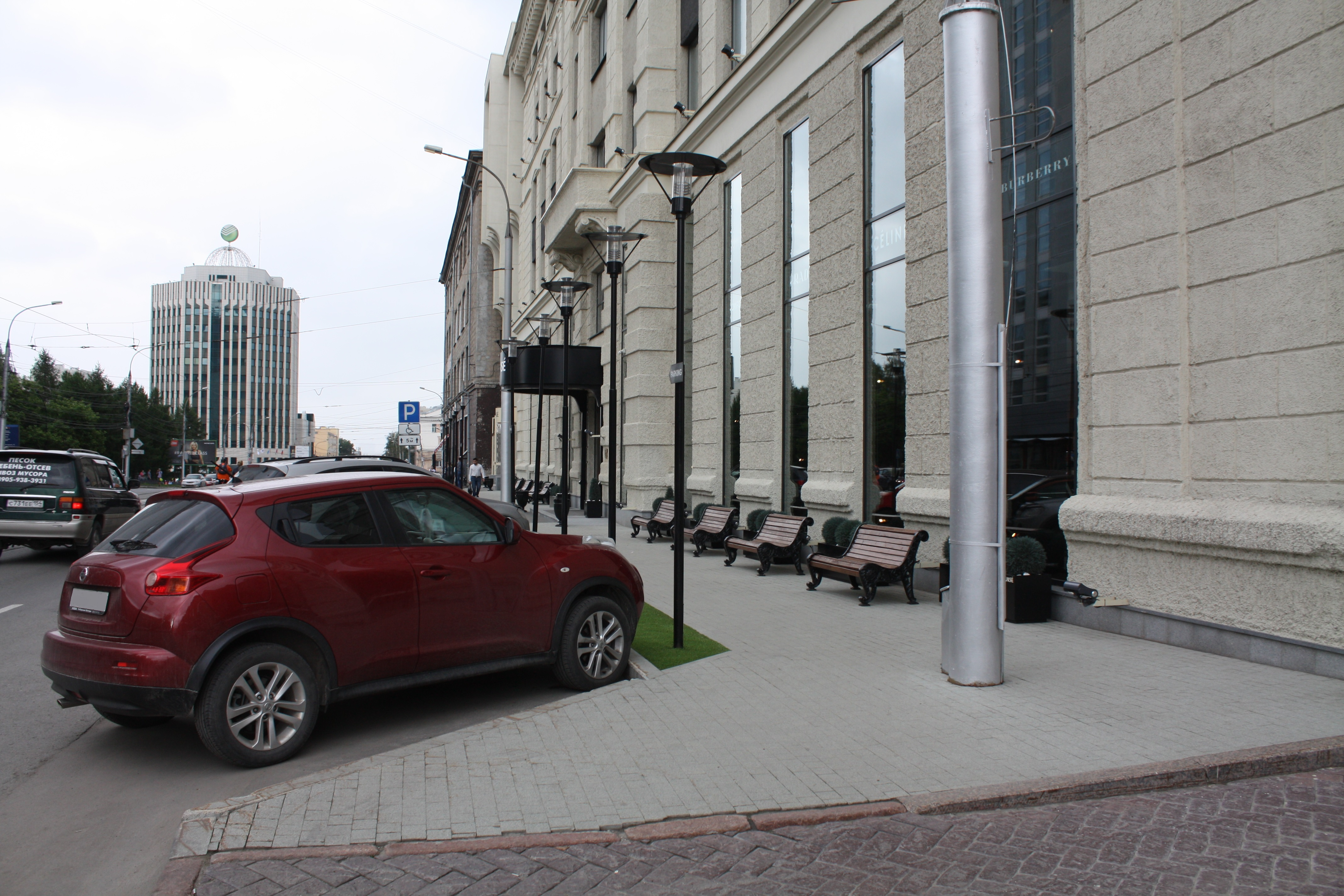

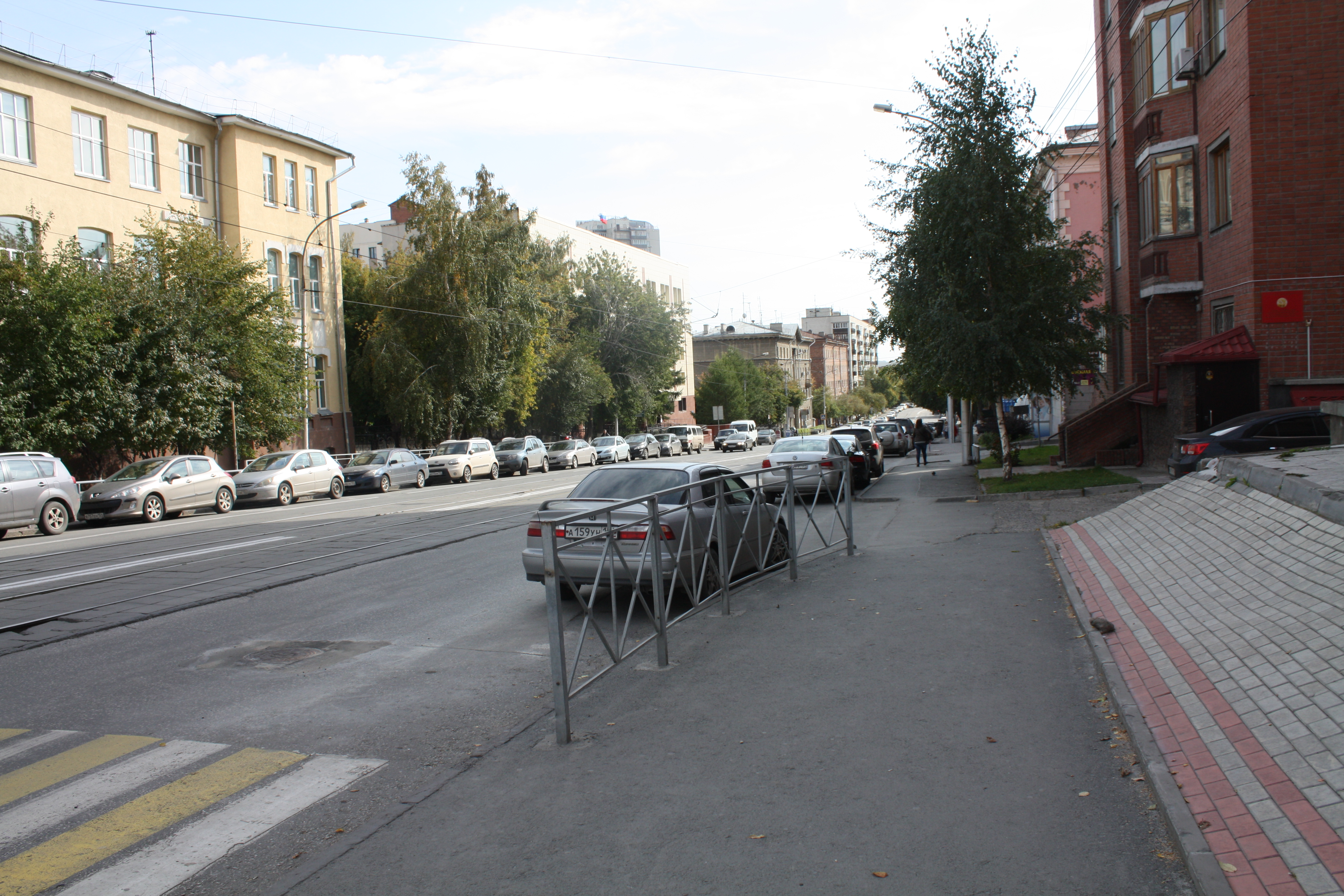

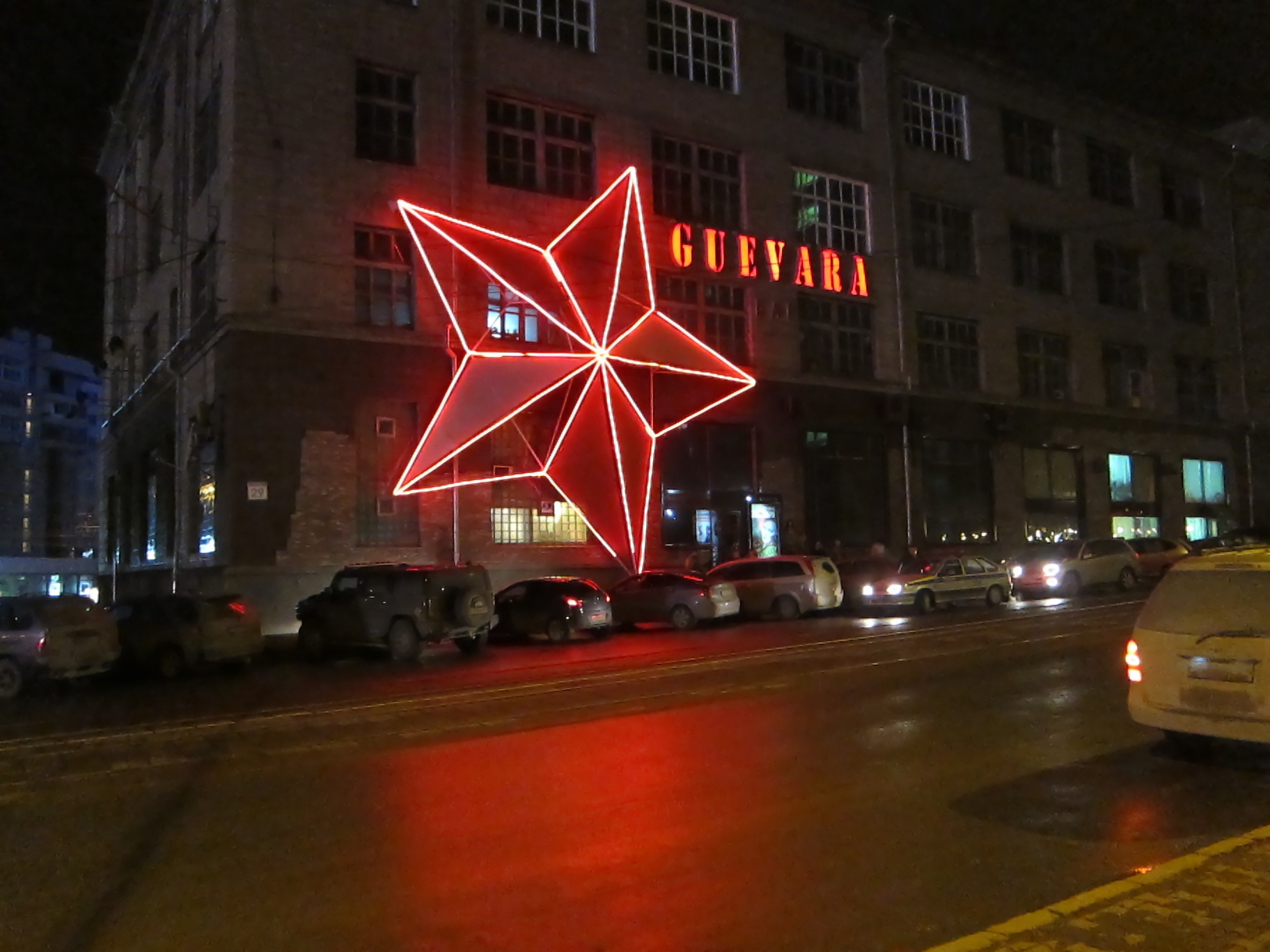
Serebrennikovskaya Street in 2013

== Architecture ==
- Revenue House is a house built in 1910s.
- School No. 12 is an educational institution, opened in 1912. Architect: Andrey Kryachkov.
- Polyclinic No. 1 is a 1928 constructivist building designed by P. Shyokin.
- NKVD House (Serebrennikovskaya Street 16) is a 1932 constructivist building designed by I. T. Voronov and B. A. Gordeyev.
- NKVD House (Serebrennikovskaya Street 23) is a 1936 constructivist building designed by I. T. Voronov, B. A. Gordeyev and S. P. Turgenev.
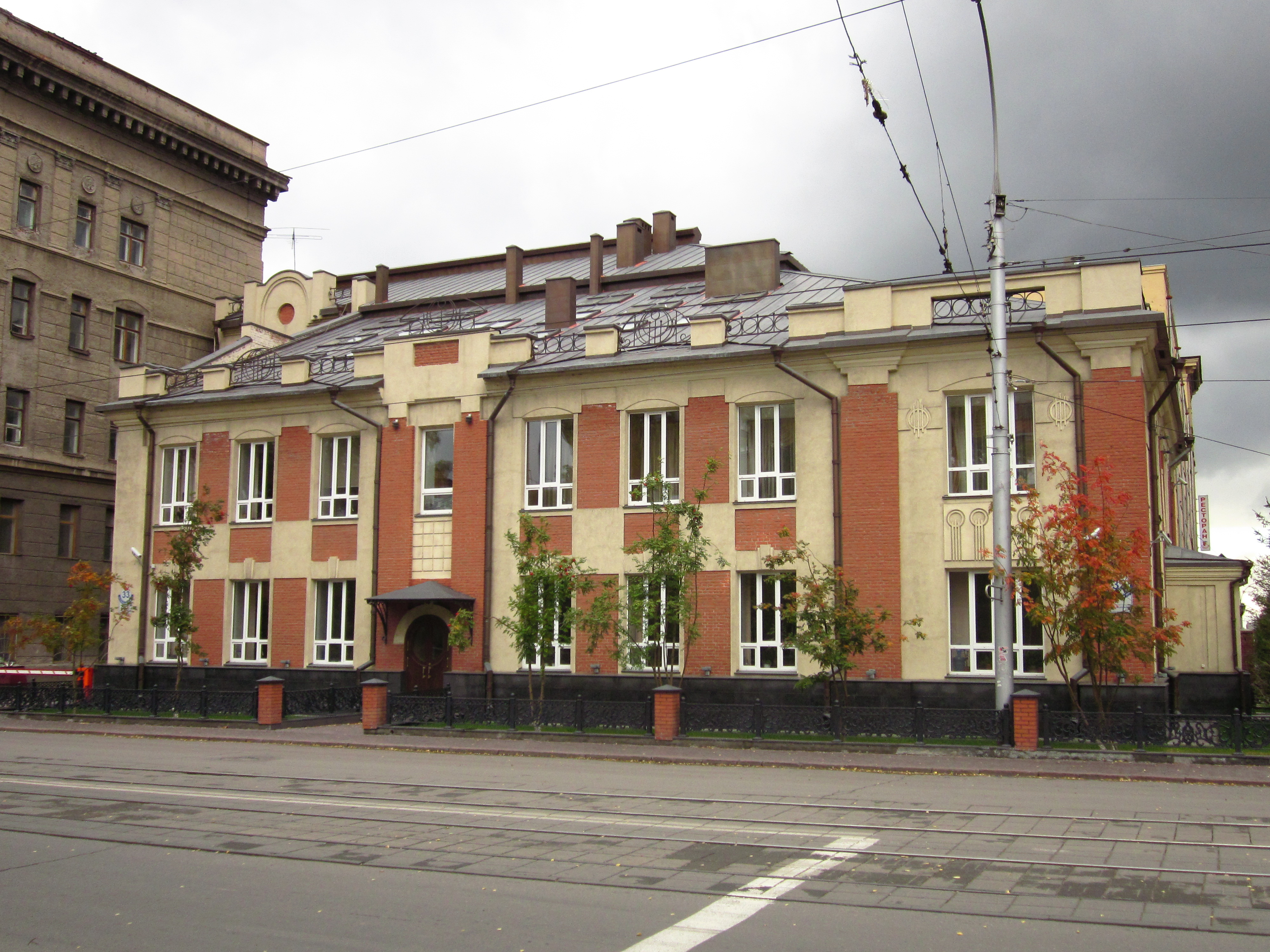
Revenue House

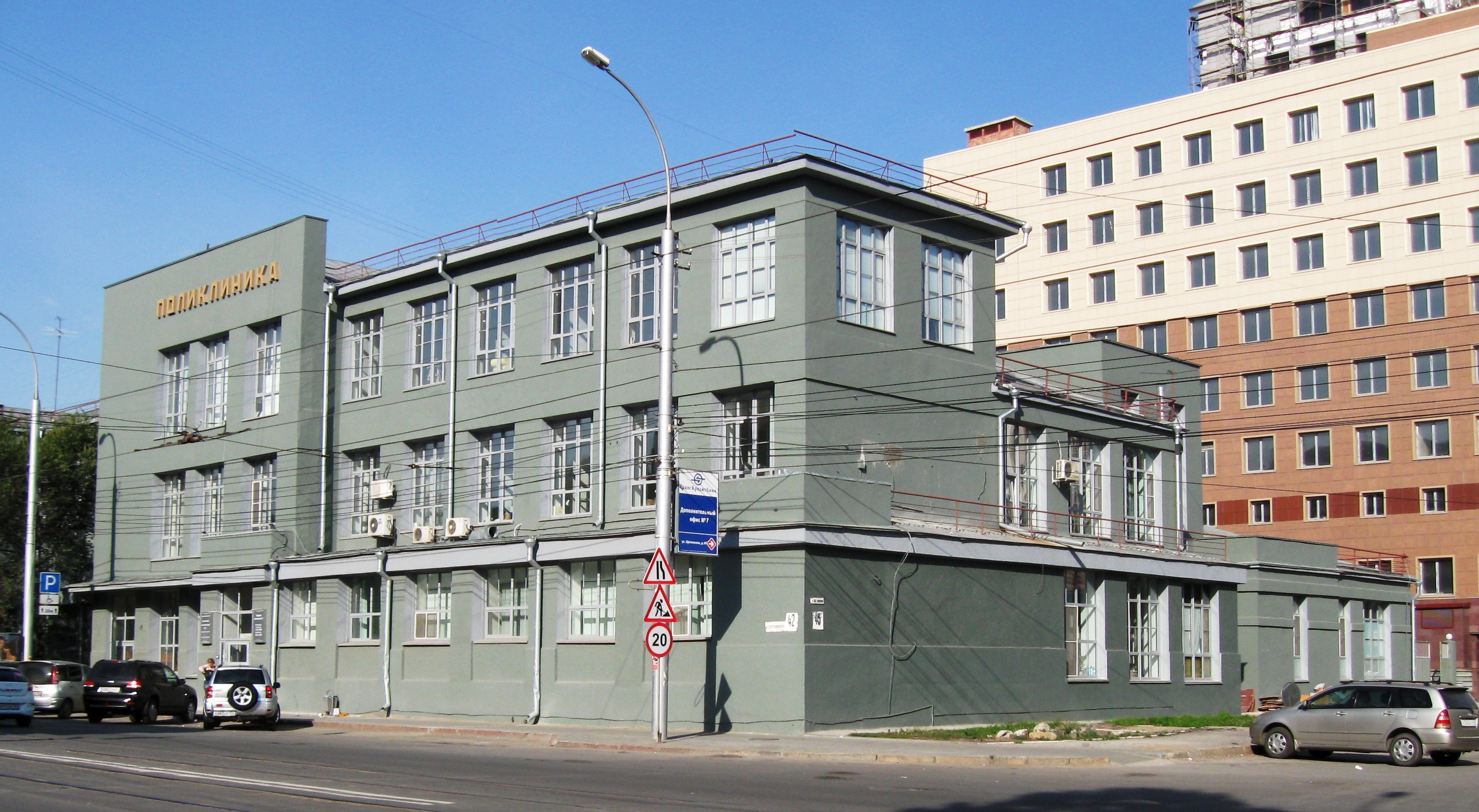
Polyclinic No. 1

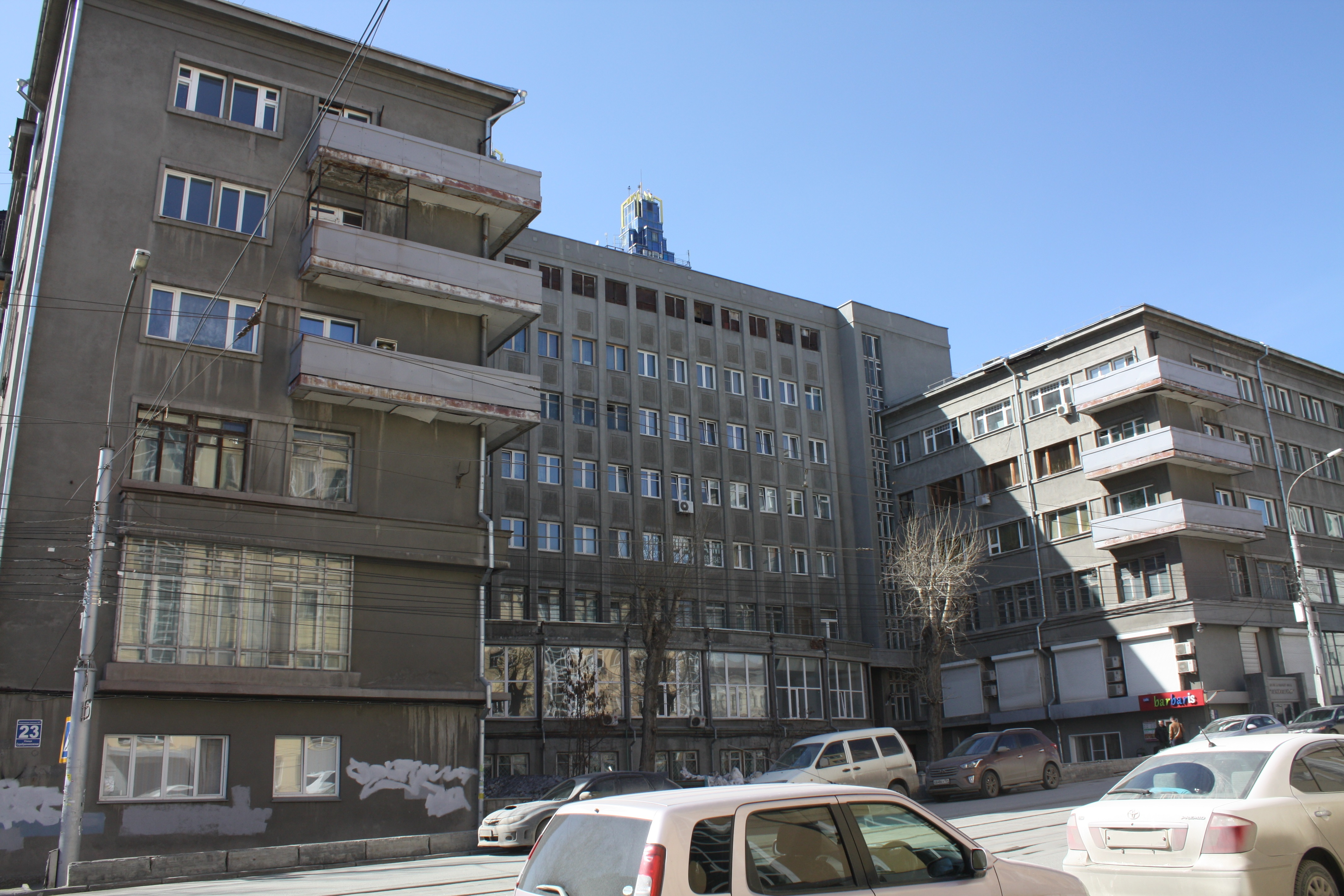
Serebrennikovskaya Street 23

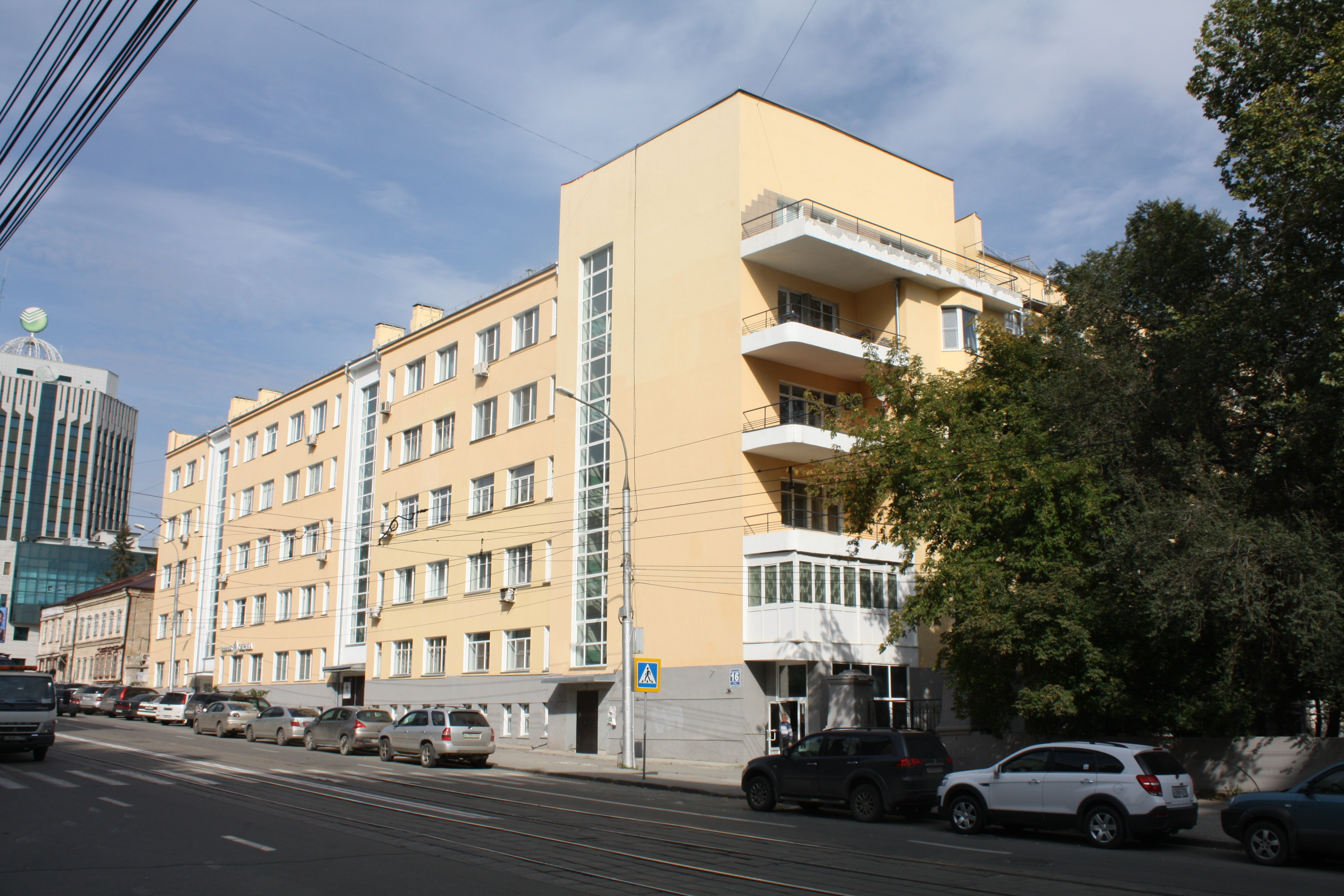
Serebrennikovskaya Street 16

== Organizations ==
- Administration of the Novosibirsk Metro
- Sberbank of Russia
- Sinar Garment Factory

== Transportation ==
=== Tram ===
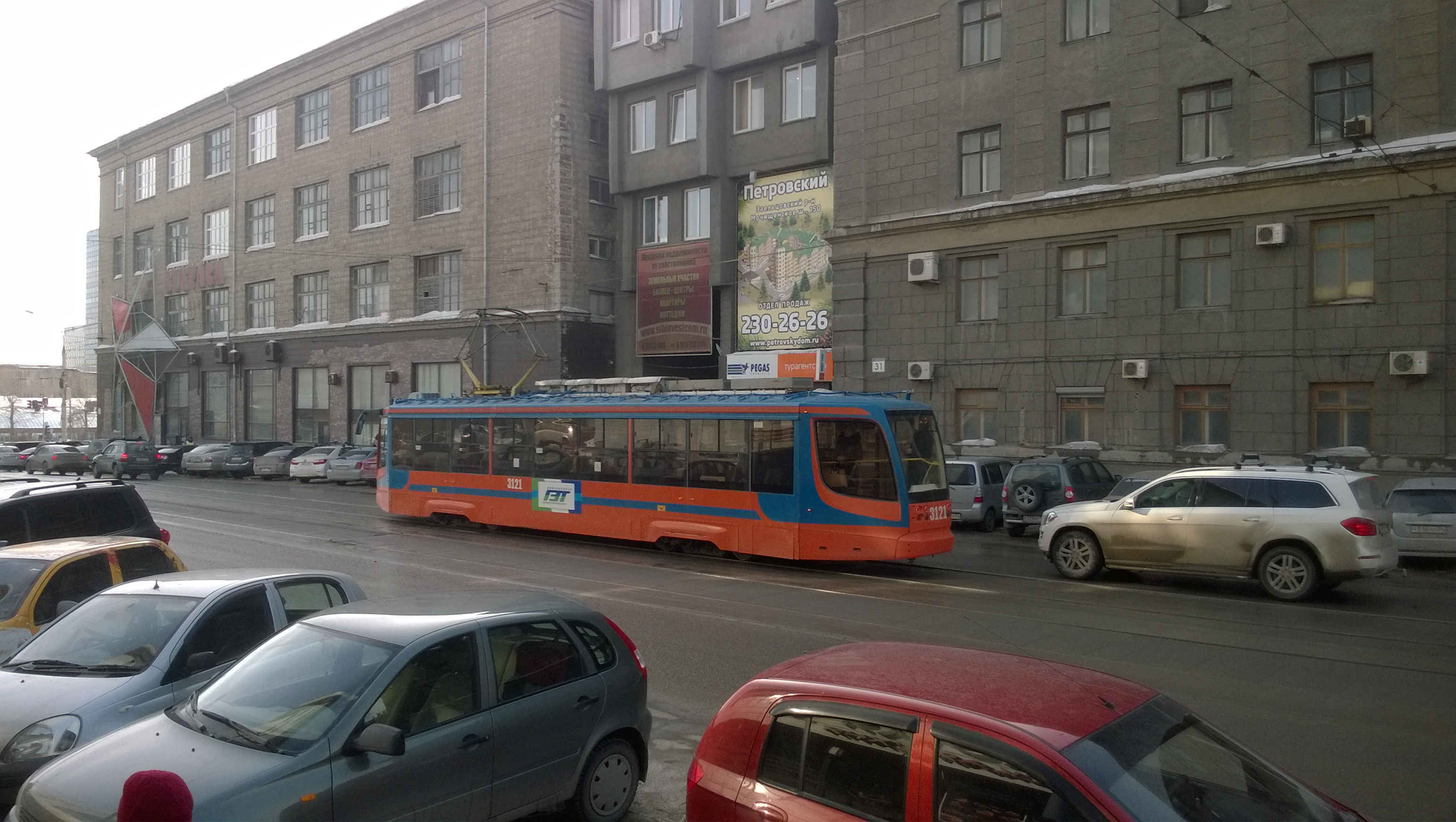

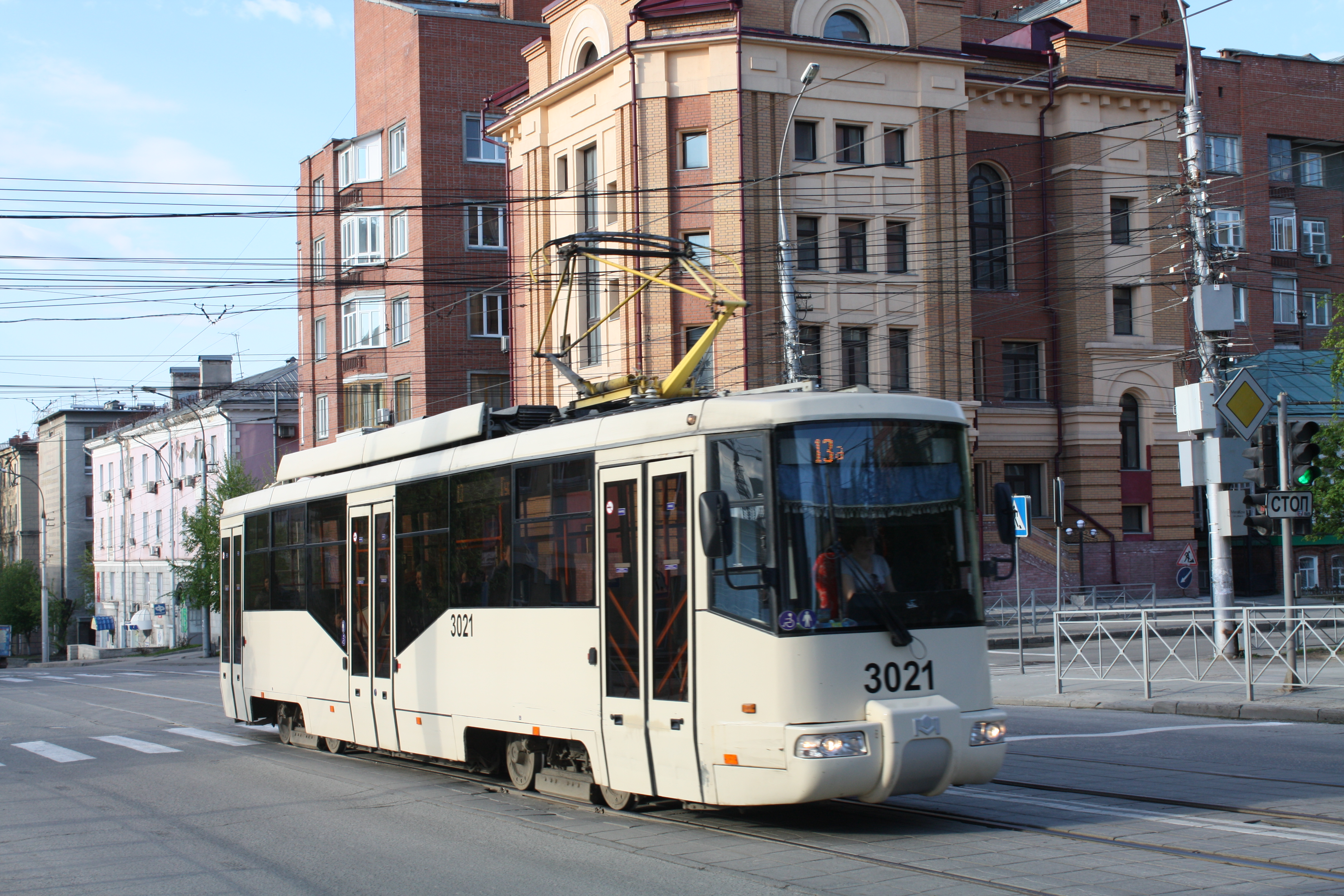

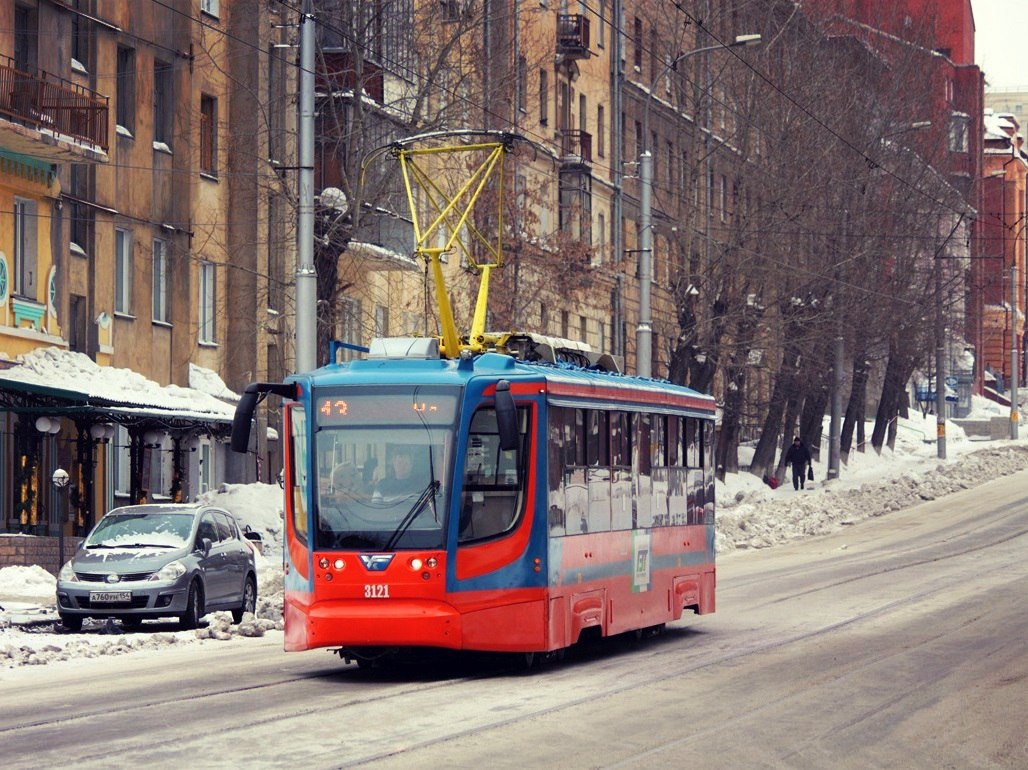
