= Sinar (clothing) =

Russian clothing manufacturer

- Industry: Clothing manufacturing
- Founded: 1921
- Headquarters: Novosibirsk, Russia
- Website: sinar.ru

Sinar (Russian: Синар) is a clothing manufacturer headquartered in Novosibirsk, Russia. It was founded in 1921. The company produces men's, women's and children's clothing.

== History ==
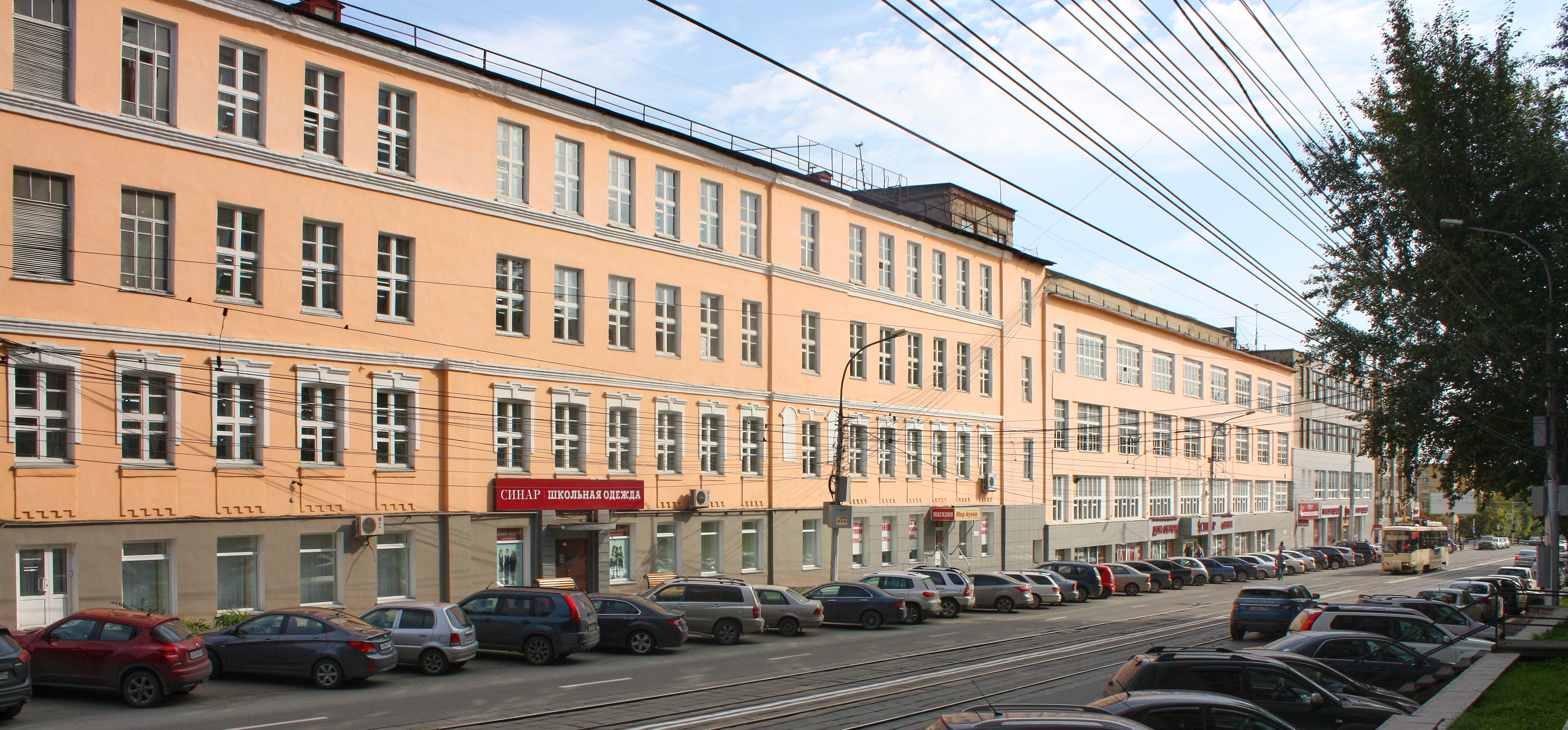
The factory buildings on Serebrennikovskaya Street.

The garment factory was created in Novonikolayevsk (current Novosibirsk) on the basis of Igla Trade Union in 1921. It had 60 sewing machines and 55 workers.

In 1997 Sinar entered into an agreement with Vyacheslav Zaytsev.

In 2012 the company opened the first store in Krasnoyarsk.

In 2015 Sinar opened the ninth store in Novosibirsk.

== Directors ==
CEO - Sayfutdinova Galiya Shakirovna

== Activity ==
The company sells clothing under the Sinar and Sono brands. The factory makes women's and men's coats, school clothes, suits, ties, etc.

== Location ==
The company's stores are located in more than 30 cities of Russia.

== Gallery ==
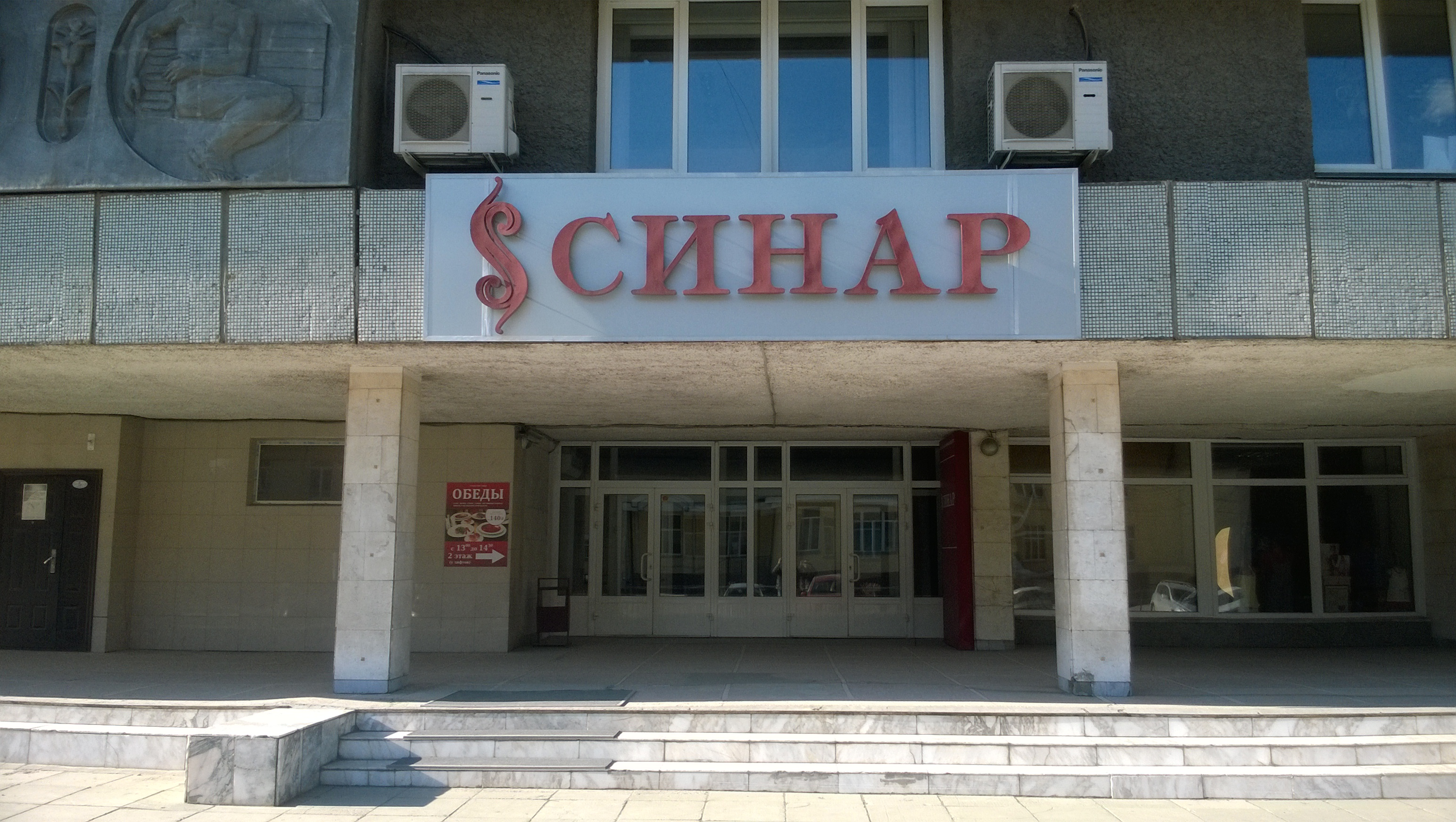

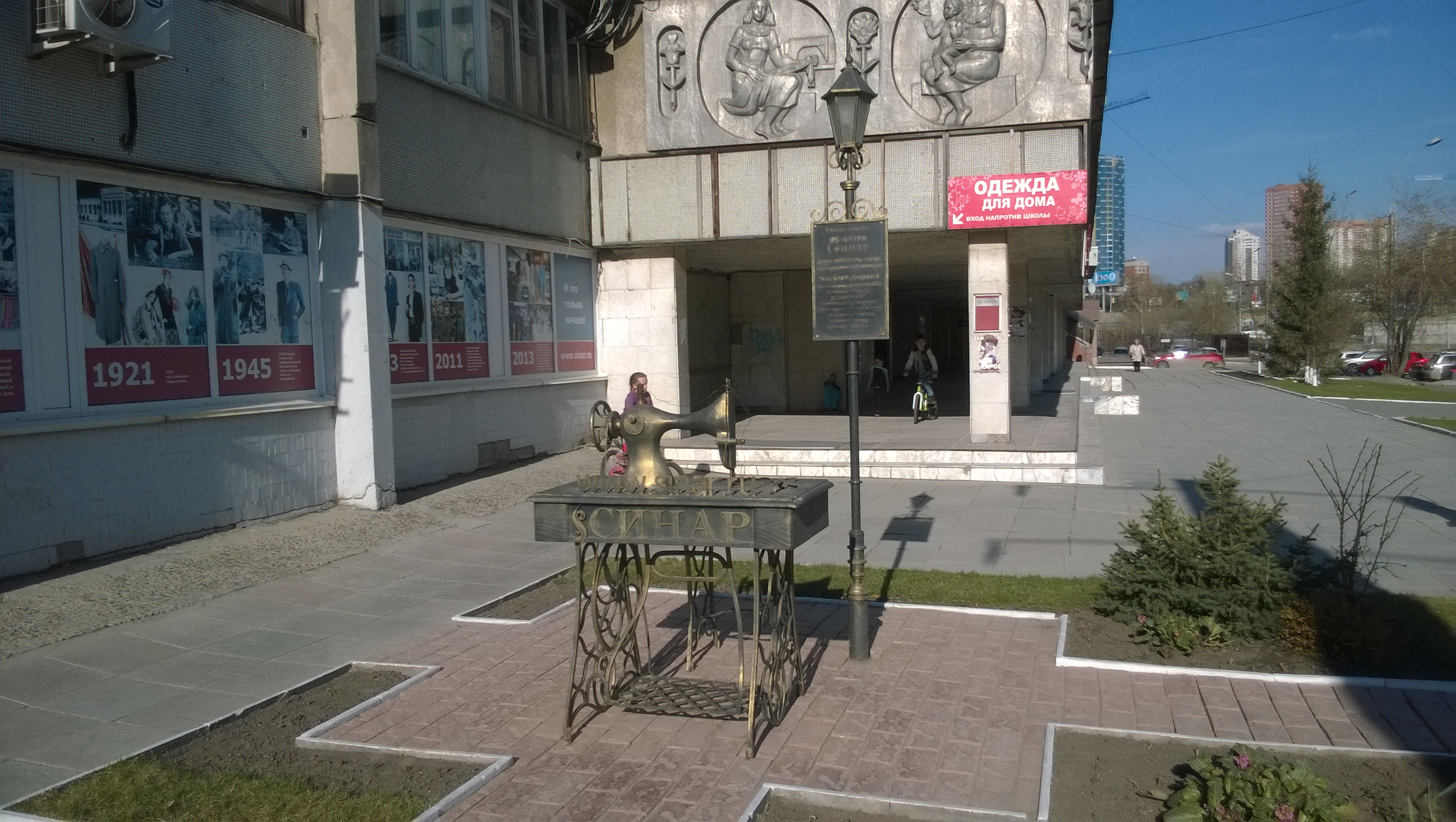

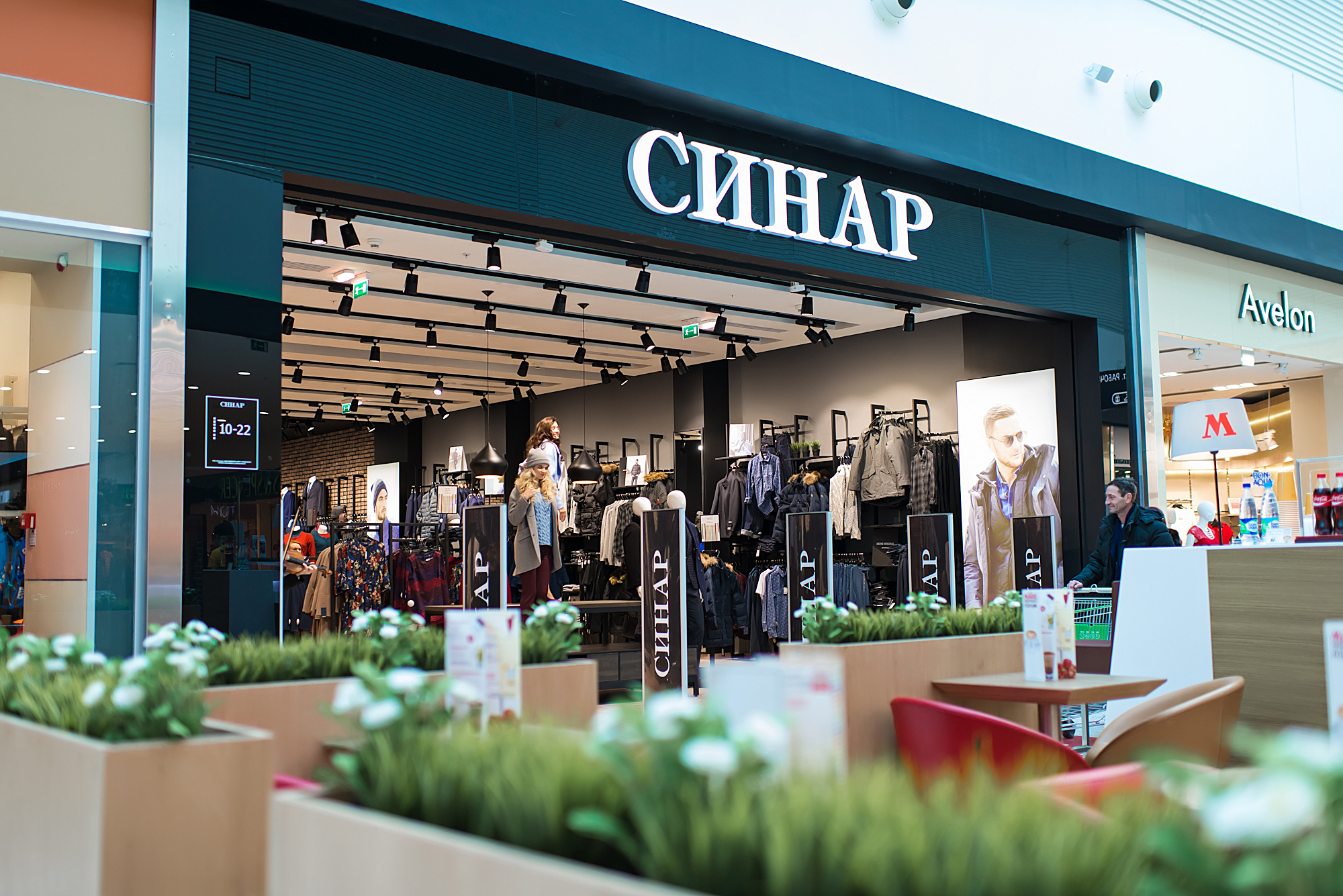

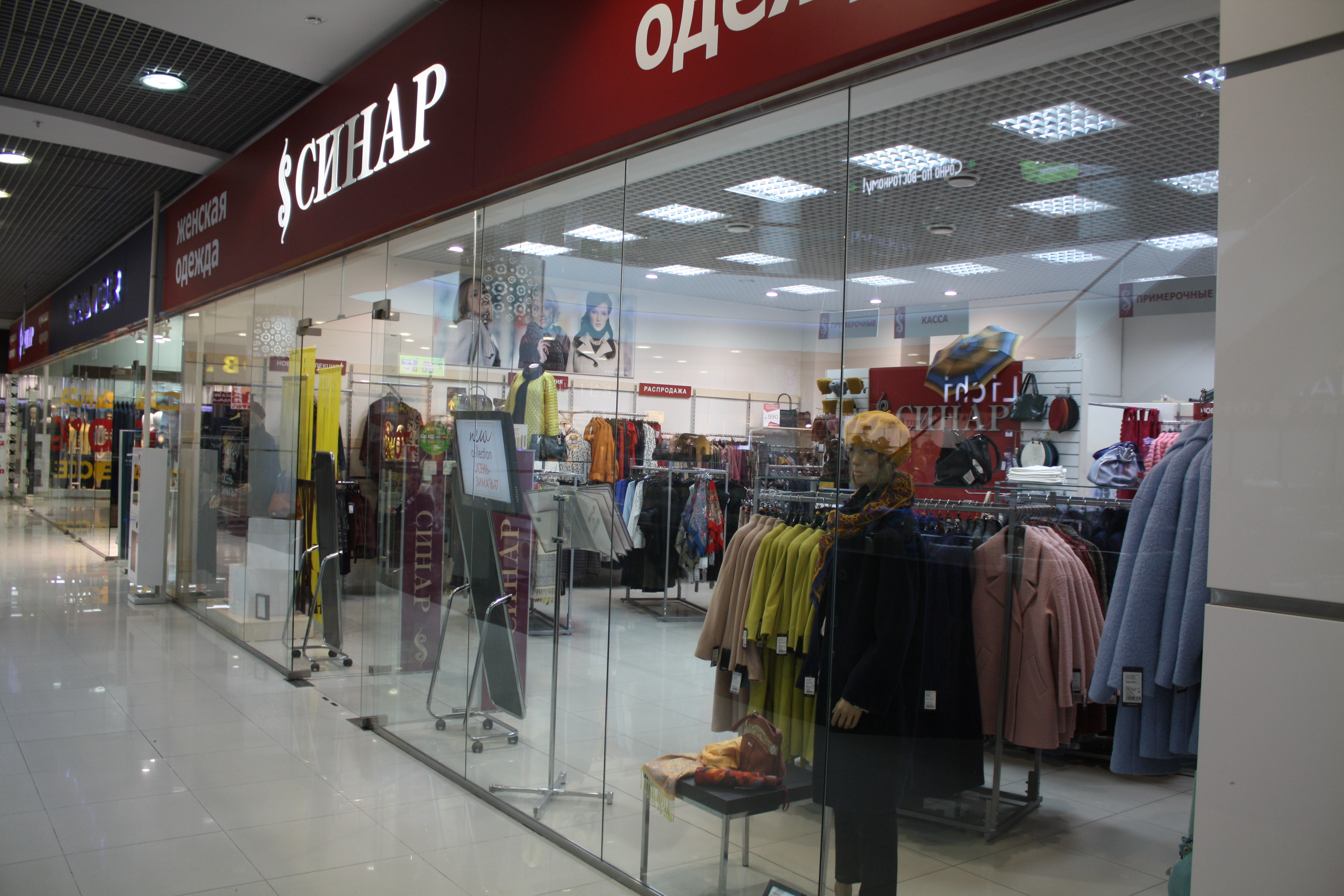
