= Dinamo Sports Complex, Novosibirsk =

Sports venue in Novosibirsk, Russia

Dinamo Sports Complex
- Спортивный комплекс «Динамо»
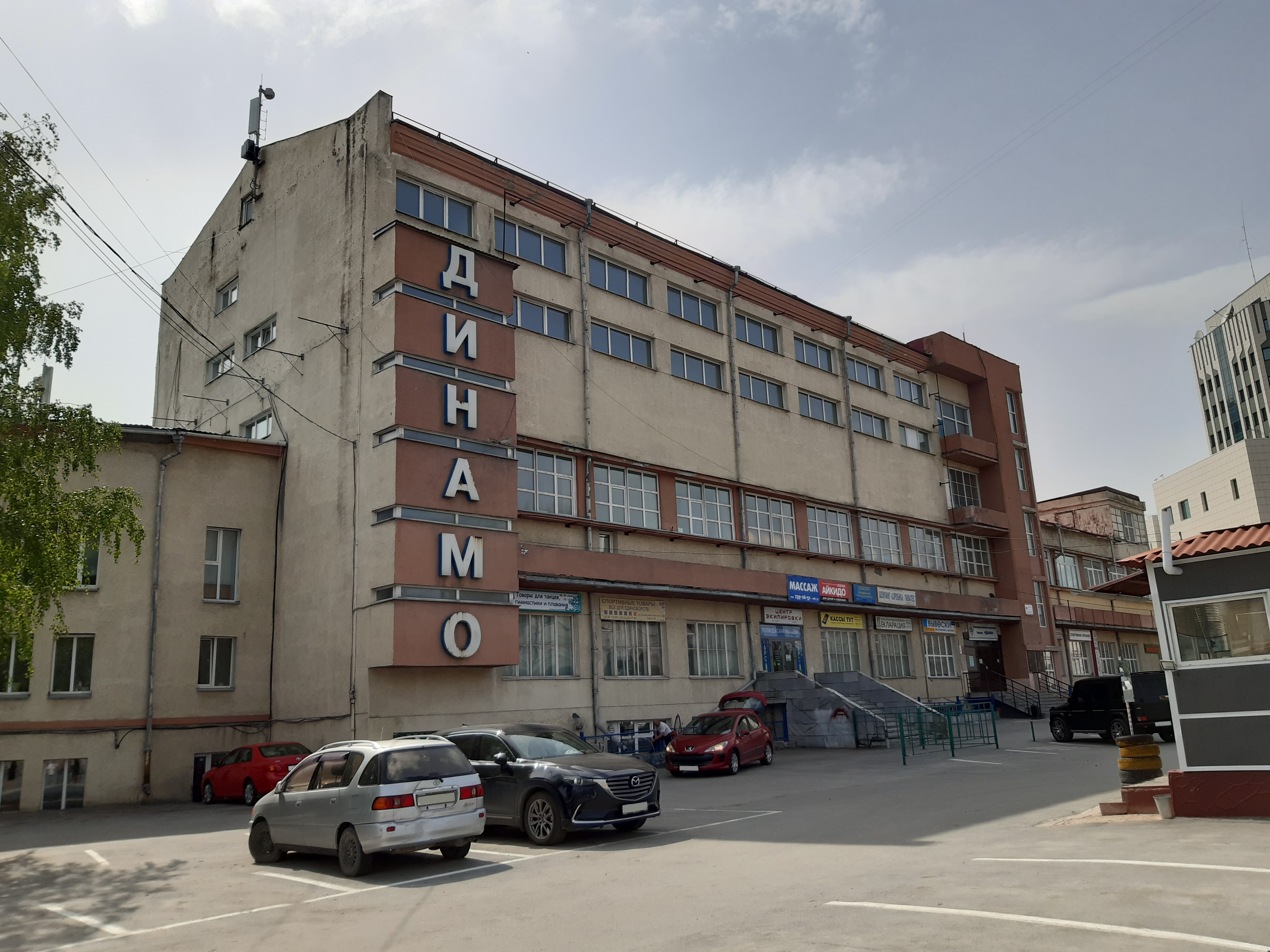
- Interactive map of the Dinamo Sports Complex area

General information
- Architectural style: constructivism
- Location: Novosibirsk, Russia
- Construction started: 1928
- Completed: 1933

Design and construction
- Architects: B. A. Gordeyev; S. P. Turgenev; V. N. Nikitin

Dinamo Sports Complex (Russian: Спортивный комплекс «Динамо») is a constructivist building in Tsentralny City District of Novosibirsk, Russia. It is located along Oktyabrskaya Magistral. The building was built in 1933. Architects: Boris Gordeyev, S. P. Turgenev, V. N. Nikitin.

== History ==
Before the construction of the complex, the location of the future Oktyabrskaya Magistral was taken into account, this street was already in the project in 1927. As a result, the sports complex was the first building that marked the direction of the magistral.
