= Partridge 1885 =

World's oldest racing yacht

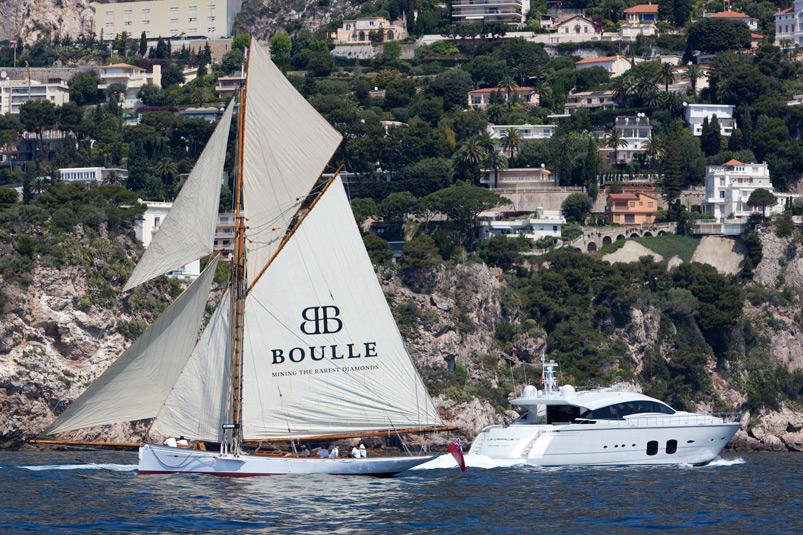
- Partridge at 2012 Monaco Yacht Show
- Other names: Rupee (1886); Polly (1889); Tanagra (1921)
- Yacht club: La Ciotat
- Nation: United Kingdom
- Designer(s): John Beavor-Webb
- Builder: Camper and Nicholsons
- Launched: June 1885
- Owner(s): Jean-Raymond Boulle

Specifications
- Type: Gaff Cutter
- Displacement: 28 tons
- Length: 21.88 m
- Beam: 3.19 m
- Draft: 2.58 m
- Sail area: 250 m2
- Crew: 15

Notes
- Captain : Alexander Laird of Classic Works, La Ciotat.

Partridge is documented as being the world's oldest, still fully operational classic racing yacht.

== History of Partridge ==
"Partridge" was built in 1885 at the Camper and Nicholson boatyard in Gosport, Hampshire, England, 'the oldest leisure marine company in the world.' Originally a shipyard in Gosport, Camper and Nicholson has since become a yacht and marina management company.

Partridge is recognised as a UK National Historic Ship and was designed by John Beavor-Webb and launched on 2 June by Miss Nora Lapthorn.

John Beavor-Webb began his career in England but worked in the US after the 1880s. In 1885, when Partridge was launched, his cutter Genesta competed in the America's Cup and he was working on the designs of a 90-ton cutter for a Lt. William Henn. Galatea (yacht) which also challenged for the America's Cup in 1886.

Nora Lapthorn was the daughter of Edwin Lapthorn who was in charge of the Ratsey and Lapthorn sail loft in Gosport at the time. Edwin Lapthorn's Mother's name was Mary Partridge. Partridge was typical of the many Victorian yachts that were popular at the time and would have been used primarily for cruising and occasional amateur yacht racing.

Partridge's Original Sail Plan

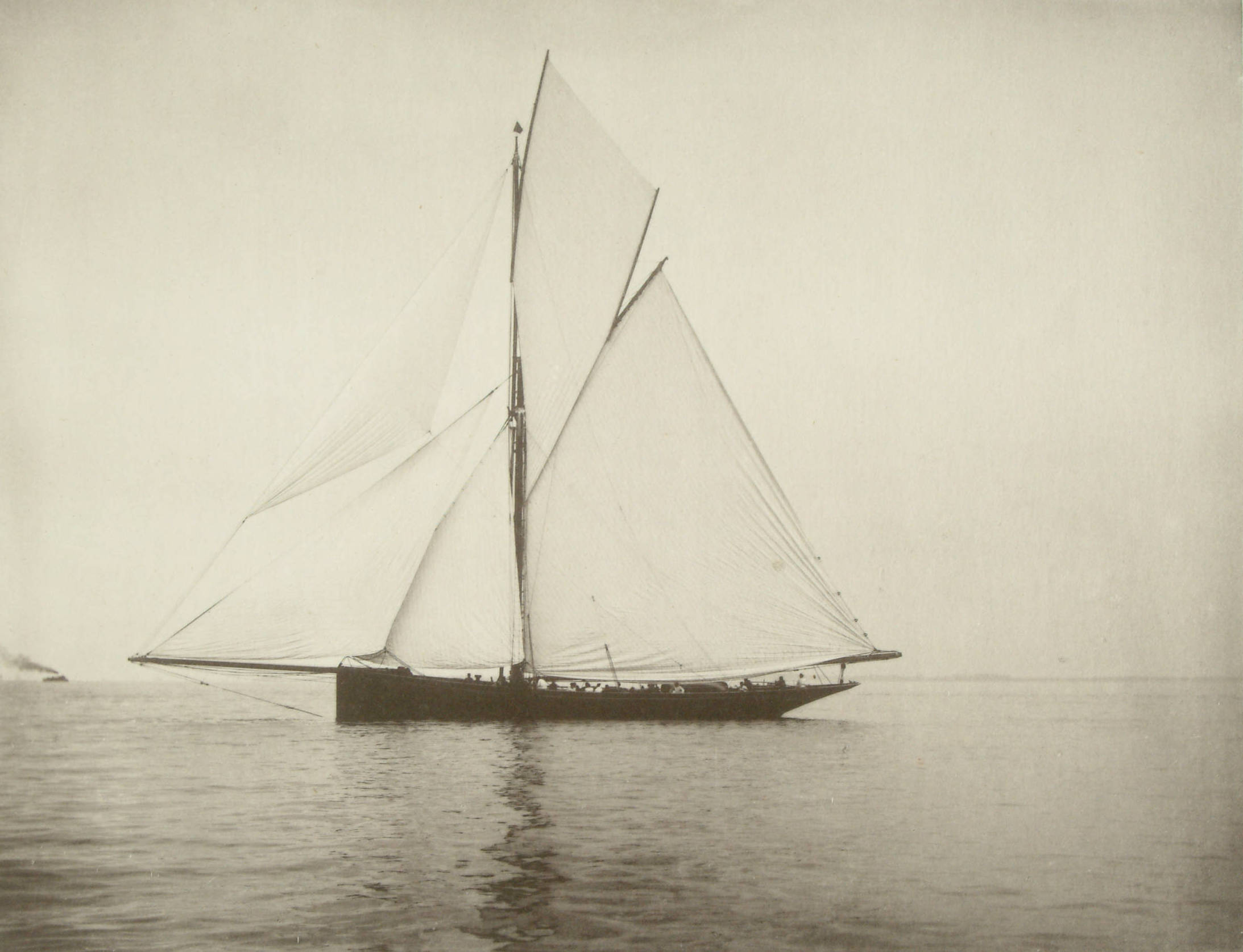
Genesta The 1885 America's Cup Challenger designed by J. Beaver Webb as photographed by Nathaniel Livermore Stebbins was broken up in 1900.

She was built to Lloyds 100A1 and subsequently appeared in the Lloyds register up until 1923. Her original first entry certificate and survey report, including a midship section drawing, are to this day still in the Lloyds archives in London. Virtually all other records of her were destroyed during the Second World War during bombing raids; in particular Camper and Nicholson's and Ratsey and Lapthorn lost many plans. Beken of Cowes have a photograph of her sister ship, Polyanthus, rigged as a yawl and built a year earlier.

Lloyd's Register has Partridge on its records until 1923 during which period, she had three name changes. These were: 1886 name changed to Rupee, 1889 name changed to Pollie and 1921 name changed to Tanagra. Her last entry in 1923 states that she was sold to a Belgian and converted to a houseboat. Hunt's Yachting magazine reports from a race held by the Royal Torbay Yacht Club on 17 July 1886: "in a steady south-westerly breeze the race produced capital competition". Yachts were to be steered by bona fide amateurs and only regular crew were allowed. First prize was £10, second £5 and third £3. The entries were: Minnow, 10 tons; Tiger, 11 tons; Mackerel, 18 tons and Partridge (now in fact named Rupee), 18 tons. All tonnages given are Thames tonnages. The start was at 1030 am and the course three times round via a mark off Brixham. Partridge was away first with Mackerel second and Tiger third. This order was maintained throughout and therefore Partridge won the £10 first prize.

The Field, in which Dixon Kemp, a British naval architect and founder of the Yacht Racing Association (today known the Royal Yachting Association) and founder of The Lloyd's Register of Yachts) wrote a yachting column, mentions Partridge as she sailed up and down the south coast of England to the various regattas and anchorages. Her launch was recorded: "Yacht launch at Gosport: On Tuesday 2nd June 1885 the new 18 ton cruising cutter Partridge, built to the order of Mr J.H. Baillie, was successfully launched from the yard of Messrs. Camper and Nicholson of Gosport. The yacht was designed by J.B. Webb and is a sister to Polyanthus, built last year by the same firm for R.H. Baillie. The christening ceremony was performed by Miss Nora Lapthorn". An entry states: "Gosport, June 8th. Polyanthus cruising yawl, Mr R.H. Baillie, for Weymouth. Yachts fitting out: Partridge, cutter, Mr J.H. Baillie". A few months later: "April 17th 1886: Gosport, the cutter Rupee, Mr C.P. Henderson, jun., will be put afloat". And 24 April: "The Rupee, cutter, was launched off Messrs. Camper and Nicholson’s upper slip on Thursday". Rupee then sailed to Torquay and was reported as being on station in that port on every weekend up until 30 October 1886.

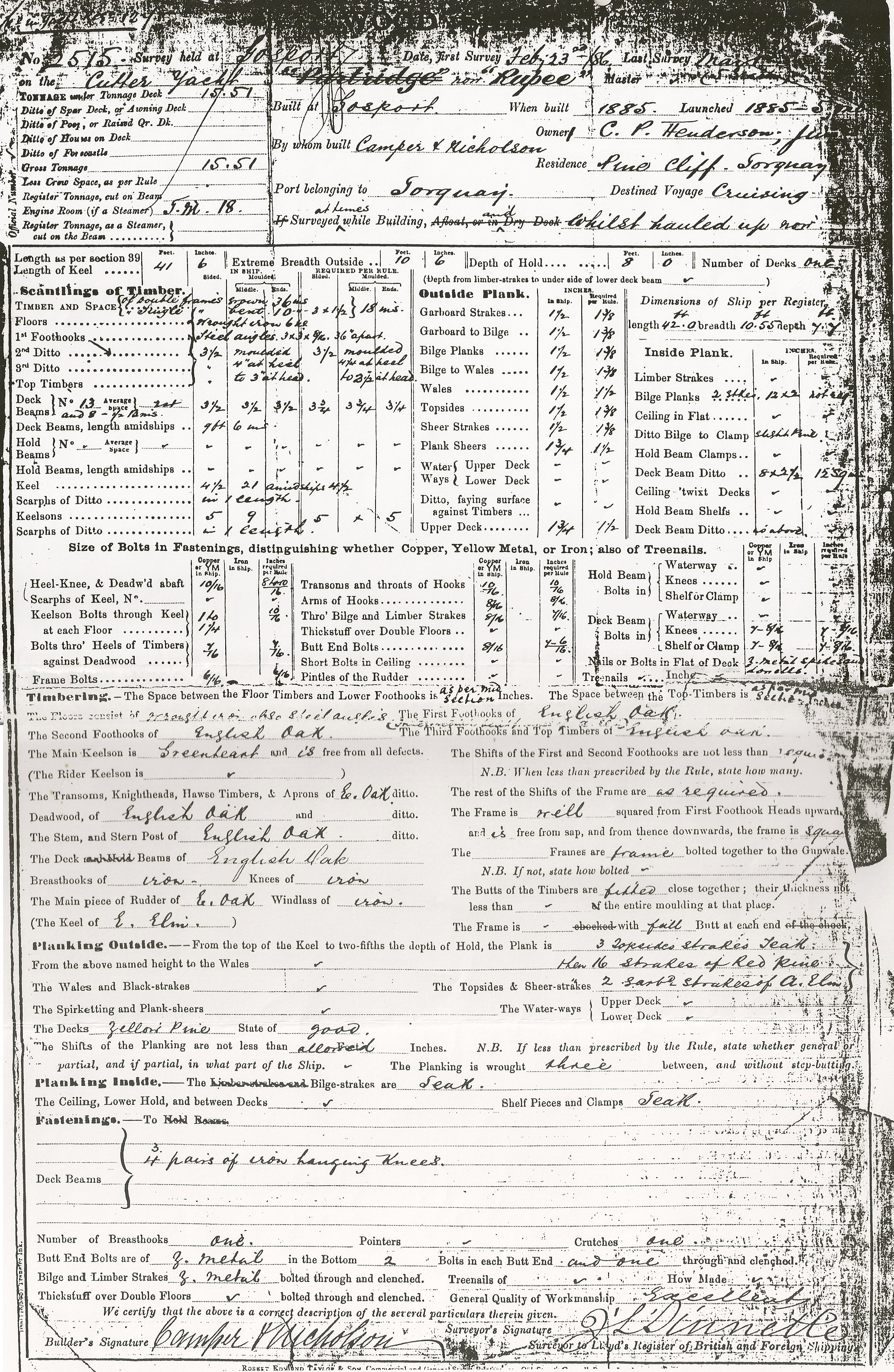
Partridge/ Rupee's 1886 Survey from Lloyd's Register

From the day of her launch up until 1923 her list of owners in chronological order was as follows:

Owner	Address
Mr J.H. Baillie	Portsmouth
Mr Charles P Henderson	Pine Cliff, Torquay, Devon
Francis Fitzpatrick Tower	66 Princes Gate, London, Middlesex
Albert Wood	Bodlondeb, Conway, N. Wales
James Stuart Goold	185 Lodge Lane, Liverpool, Lancaster
Henry Bunster Harris	No.8 Hyde Park Mansions, London, Middlesex
John Goldsmid	56 Redcliffe Gardens, South Kensington, London
William Henry Goldsmid	11 Bentinck Street, Cavendish Square, London
Ebenezer Southgate	The Nook, Church Road, Brightlingsea, Essex
Frederick Backhouse Hulke	Admiralty House, Deal, Kent
William Mansfield Clark	William Wren, Essex Road, Burnham-on-Crouch, Essex
Henry Tompson Holloway	840 Salisbury House, London EC
Ralph Cudworth Romer	Westons, Rusper, Sussex
L.H.F. Damen	c/o Royal Corinthian Yacht Club, Burnham-on-Crouch

This information all comes from Lloyd's Register that gives Partridge's burgee details as three vertical panels: red, blue and red with a white spot in the centre of the central blue panel.

When Partridge was discovered on the east coast of England in 1979, lying on her side at Tollesbury on the River Blackwater (see picture right), little about her was known. Her previous owner was only able to give two pieces of information concerning her history, apart from the fact that he had removed hundreds of cast iron ballast pigs from her bilges and thrown them into the river a few years earlier. The first piece of information was that the boat had once been called Tanagra and the second piece was that a previous owner, upon removing an old deck beam from up in the fo’csle, had come across the carved words: "Harry 1885". From these two pieces of information it was possible to discover who she was and where she came from. Lloyds Register was searched for mention of the name Tanagra and in 1923 a yacht of this name, that had similar length and tonnage characteristics to the hull found at Tollesbury, had been registered. The Lloyds list gives the previous name of every vessel and therefore it was possible to go back, year by year, until in 1885, the date carved by "Harry", was reached and the vessel's name was given as Partridge built at Camper and Nicholsons in Gosport. All the relevant measurements matched the hull and subsequently, one hundred years later, it was possible to re-register the yacht in her original name, with Southampton as the port of Registry.

To confirm her identity, the records at Lloyds in Fenchurch Street, London, included the yacht's first entry certificate. This included a full specification of her construction materials and scantlings plus a midship section drawing showing the lead keel, floors, planking, bilge stringers, shelf, deck beams and deck. The full-length greenheart keelson, that was soon discovered under the mud that was excavated from the hull, was also drawn on the midship section.

Under "general remarks", the surveyor, in 1885, has written: "Secretary’s letters dated 18 March, 13 and 20 April: this small yacht was from time to time examined by the undersigned during her construction; after her launch, she was at once hauled up and was fitted out; the keel, bottom and sides have now been cleaned down, ballast shifted at (unreadable), an examination made and all placed in good and efficient condition. It will be observed that the collective weight of the two anchors is under the weight given in the suggested tables but when attention was called to this, the master stated most strongly that they could not find room, or use heavier, and would if allowed to follow their own views, take even lighter; at the same time the builders desire me to state, that if the committee cannot accept then they shall be removed and heavier ones supplied on being informed accordingly, but trust that in the meantime the fig.1 will be granted. Having regard to the fine bow of this yacht together with the views above referred to, I beg respectfully to recommend that the anchor be approved to remain for the fig.1 particularly seeing that they are of the pattern known as Thomas patent which for holding power cannot be surpassed ".

== Restoration of Partridge ==
The restoration of Partridge began in 1979 when Alexander Laird received a letter from Peter Saxby suggesting they restore an old wooden boat together, with Peter providing the funds and Alex doing the boatbuilding. Alex went off in search of a suitable project and came across the hull, of what would subsequently turn out to be Partridge, in November 1979. The hull was salvaged and towed to a quayside in Tollesbury on the River Blackwater in Essex, England. From there she was craned out of the river at high tide (see picture right) and taken on the back of a truck to the Isle of Wight.

Partridge was taken to Shalfleet on the Isle of Wight and craned off onto a pre-prepared concrete plinth at Shalfleet House where over the next eight years, the hull, whilst all the time drying out, was restored intermittently with main jobs being the renewal of all the frames, repairs to hull planking, the renewal of all deck beams and the casting of a new 9 tonne lead keel.

In 1989 Partridge was taken from the garden in Shalfleet to Hythe Marine Services on Southampton Water where the lead keel was drilled off and bolted to the hull and the teak deck was laid with the help of a shipwright from the boatyard.

Then in 1993 Partridge was moved to Groves and Gutteridge (today part Fairey Marine) marina in Cowes on the Isle of Wight where Partridge's restoration was to be completed under a purpose-built shed.

All final details were completed in Cowes including the building of the mast and spars in a small workshop rented from Harry Spencer at Spencer Thetis wharf. Partridge was restored as closely as possible to her original specification. However, modern methods and materials were used where it was felt that they might have been used in 1885 had the materials been available (e.g. plywood sub-deck and rubber caulking in the deck seams).

== Rebirth of Partridge ==
Partridge was launched in 1998 and sailing trials, with new sails by Ratsey & Lapthorn (Partridge's original sailmakers in 1885), were completed in the Solent with Partridge based at Cowes.

In 1999, after a summer of sailing in the Solent, Partridge was placed on a cargo ship and taken to the Mediterranean, being offloaded on the island of Mallorca. In August 1999 she won her first regatta at the Trofeo Almirante Conde de Barcelona in Palma and then went on to take first prize for best restoration at Monaco Classic Week and then first prize at Les Voiles de Saint Tropez. One of the crew who has stood by Partridge 1885 is Scott Digger Dillon: Digger was walking the quay in Monaco 1999 and found Partridge stern to the quay: he spoke with Partridge and found that Partridge was looking for crew and as Digger was recently from the Solent (Southern Sailing John Goode) he fit in nicely. At one time racing Digger was under water on the bowsprit changing the jib for approximately 30 minutes. Digger sailed most races from 1999 - 2005, when not on SY Tuiga of Monaco Yacht Club. Alex Laird the captain and owner of Partridge, along with Peter Saxby (who enjoys a chocolate biscuit in San Remo), Butch Dalrymple Smith of Butch Design participate in the classic yacht comraderies. Following much sail trimming the sails had become to what Digger thought to be close to perfect in shape and gave much drive and speed.

It was unfortunate in St Tropez, Partridge was hit from astern by SY Mariette in the race: Partridge 1885 was forced to retire for the whole regatta leaving Digger to stay ashore in ST Tropez to look after the yacht. The damage to the hull of Partridge was seen to be less substantial than first explored. There was a chunk of wood bitten out on the starboard stern quarter by the Mariette dolphin striker: however as important as the starboard stern quarter was the damage to the Gaff main sail: the Gaff main sail was pierced and ripped by the Mariette bowsprit approximately 1 meter in from the Partridge mast, and 1.5 meters up from the Partridge boom. The rip in the Gaff main sail halted any thought of further sailing until it was repaired by Ratsey and Lapthorn - after bending the Gaff main sail on there was much Gaff main sail trimming to try to gain the same sail shape as before the Gaff main sail was pierced, alas.

Digger relocated following Partridge to La Ciotat where he worked for SY Royono, while occasionally serving coffee.

In 2001 Partridge was shipped back to Cowes for the 150th anniversary of the first America's Cup, the America's Cup Jubilee regatta and she finished in third place in her class.

She was then shipped back to the Mediterranean and was based in Antibes from 2001 to 2003. In 2004 her permanent base became Classic Works La Ciotat and between 2004 and 2012 she raced regularly in various regattas of the Mediterranean classic yacht circuit.

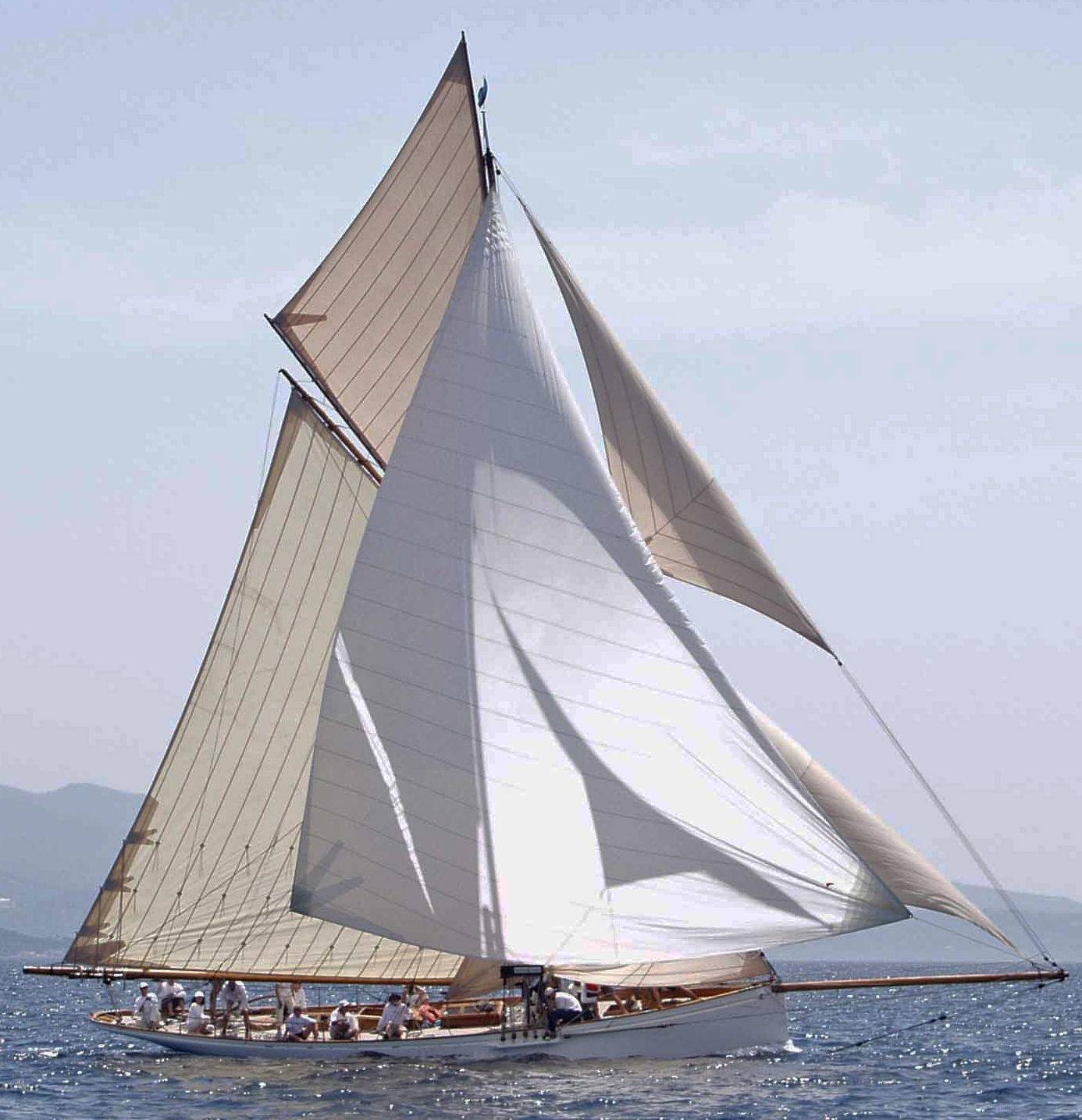
Partridge racing in Ajaccio

In 2014, with Jean-Raymond Boulle now as her owner, she won her class and the Rolex Trophy at Les Voiles de Saint Tropez.

In 2015, Partridge celebrated its 130th anniversary, and Prince Albert, President of the Yacht Club de Monaco came to celebrate on board.

== Image gallery ==
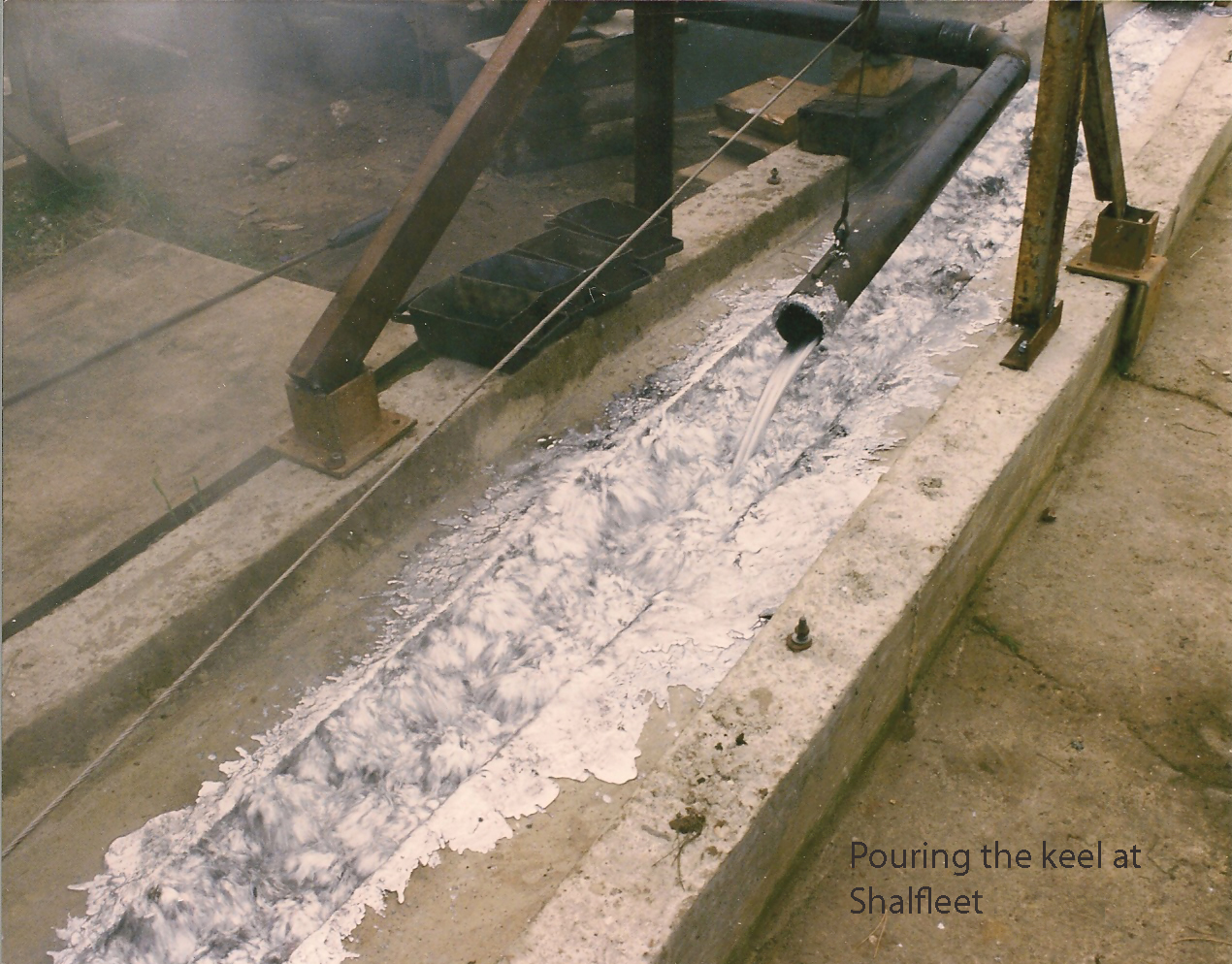
Pouring the Lead Keel of Partridge

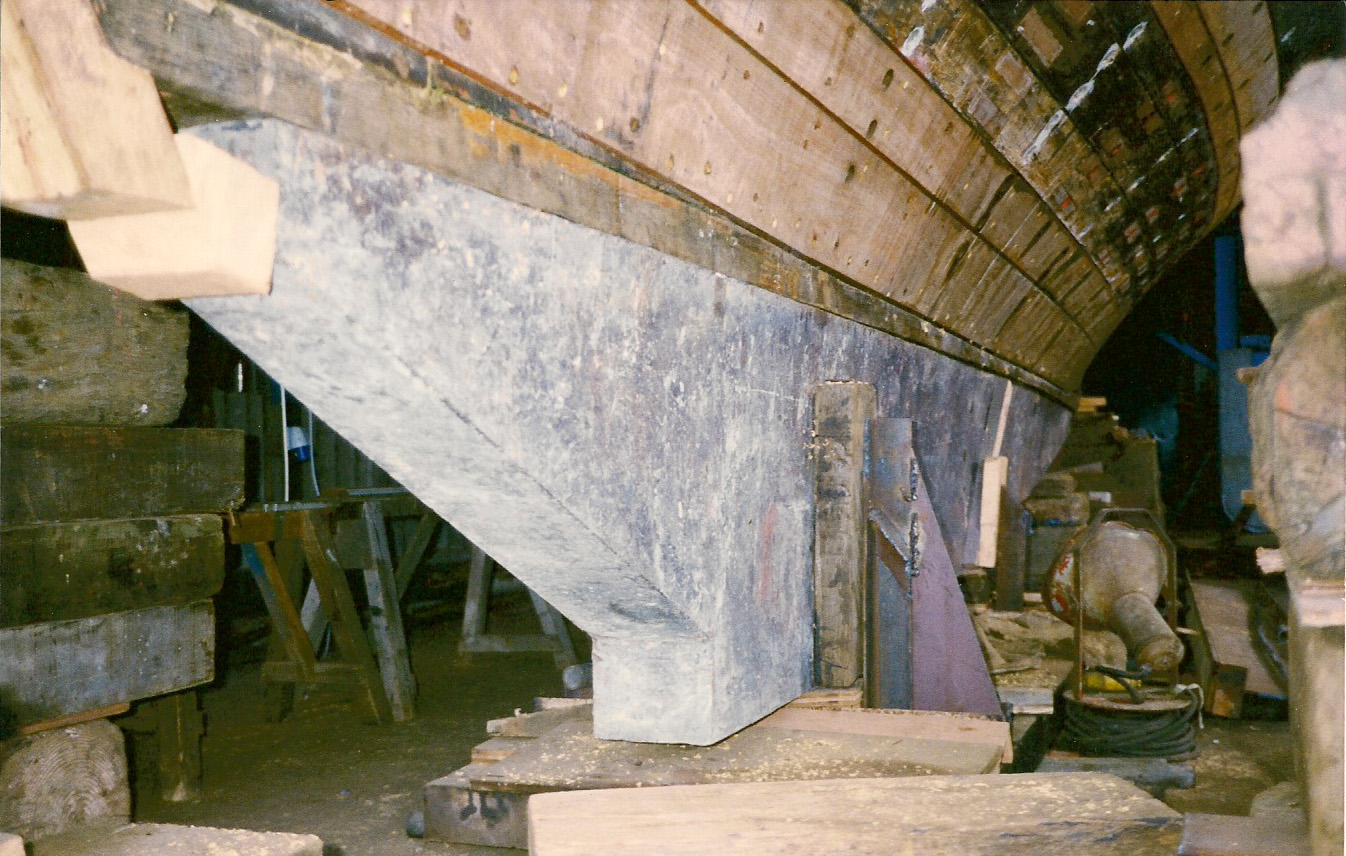
Partridge's Keel in Place

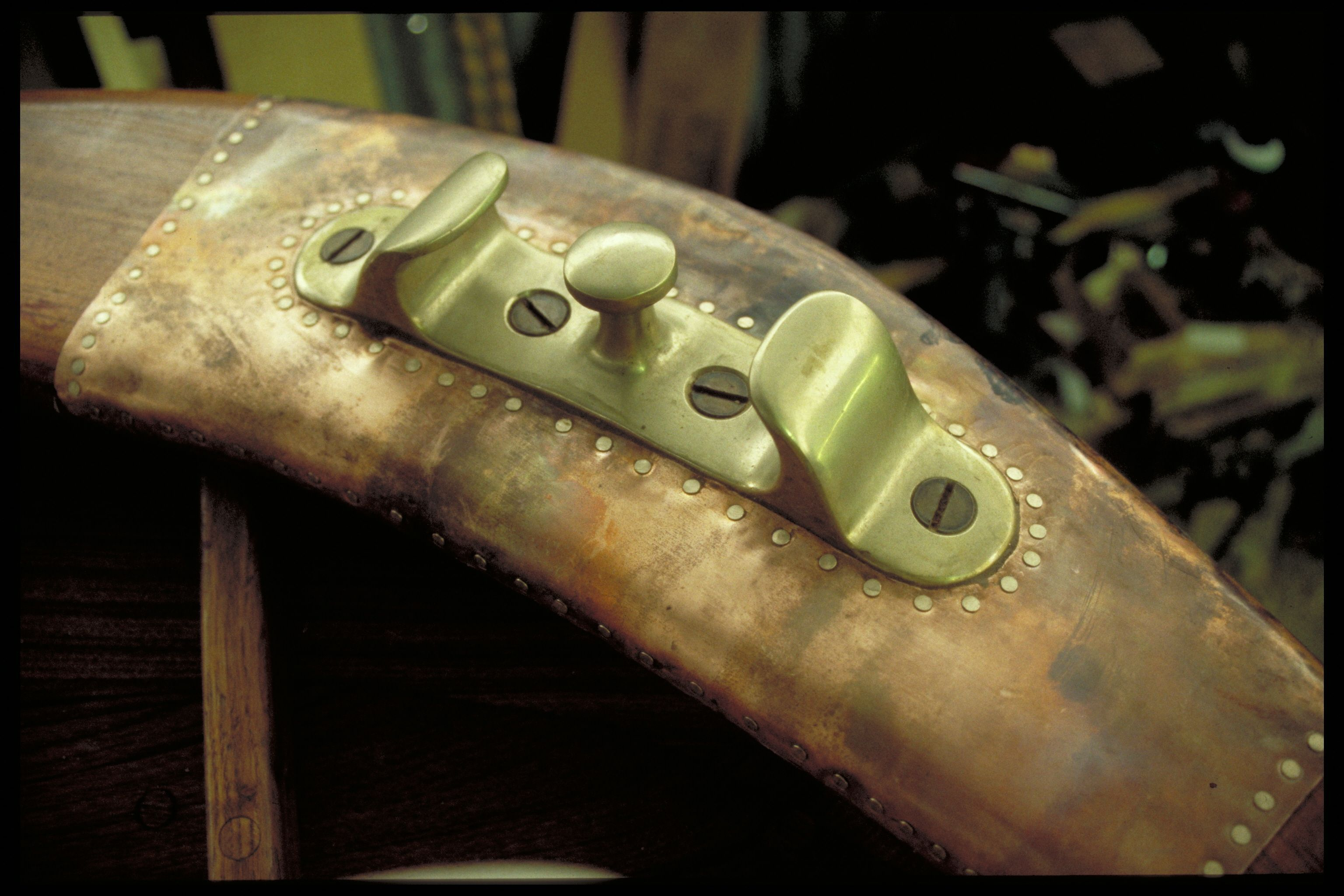
Partridge 1885 - detail

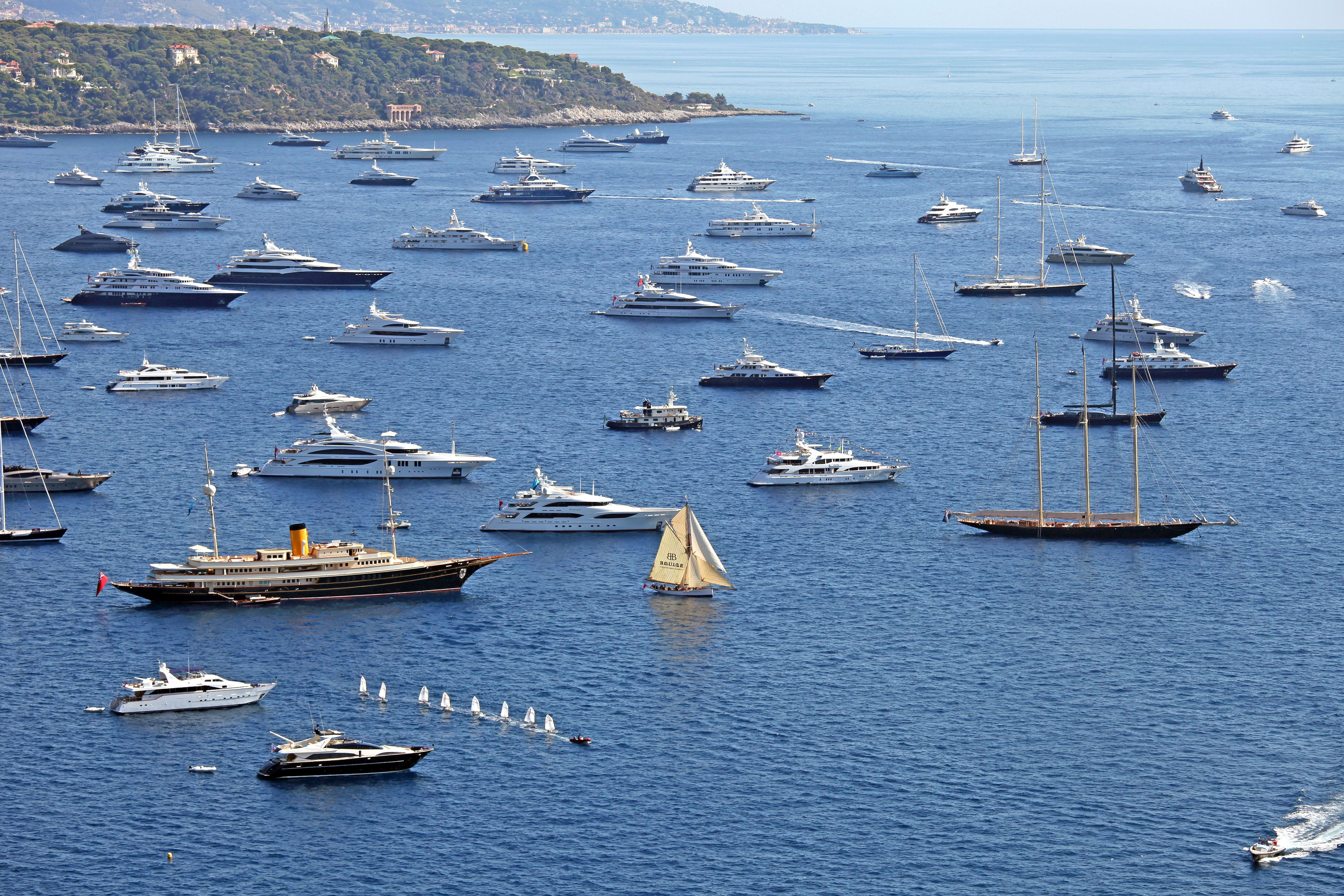
Partridge 1885, the world's oldest racing yacht at Monaco Yacht Show

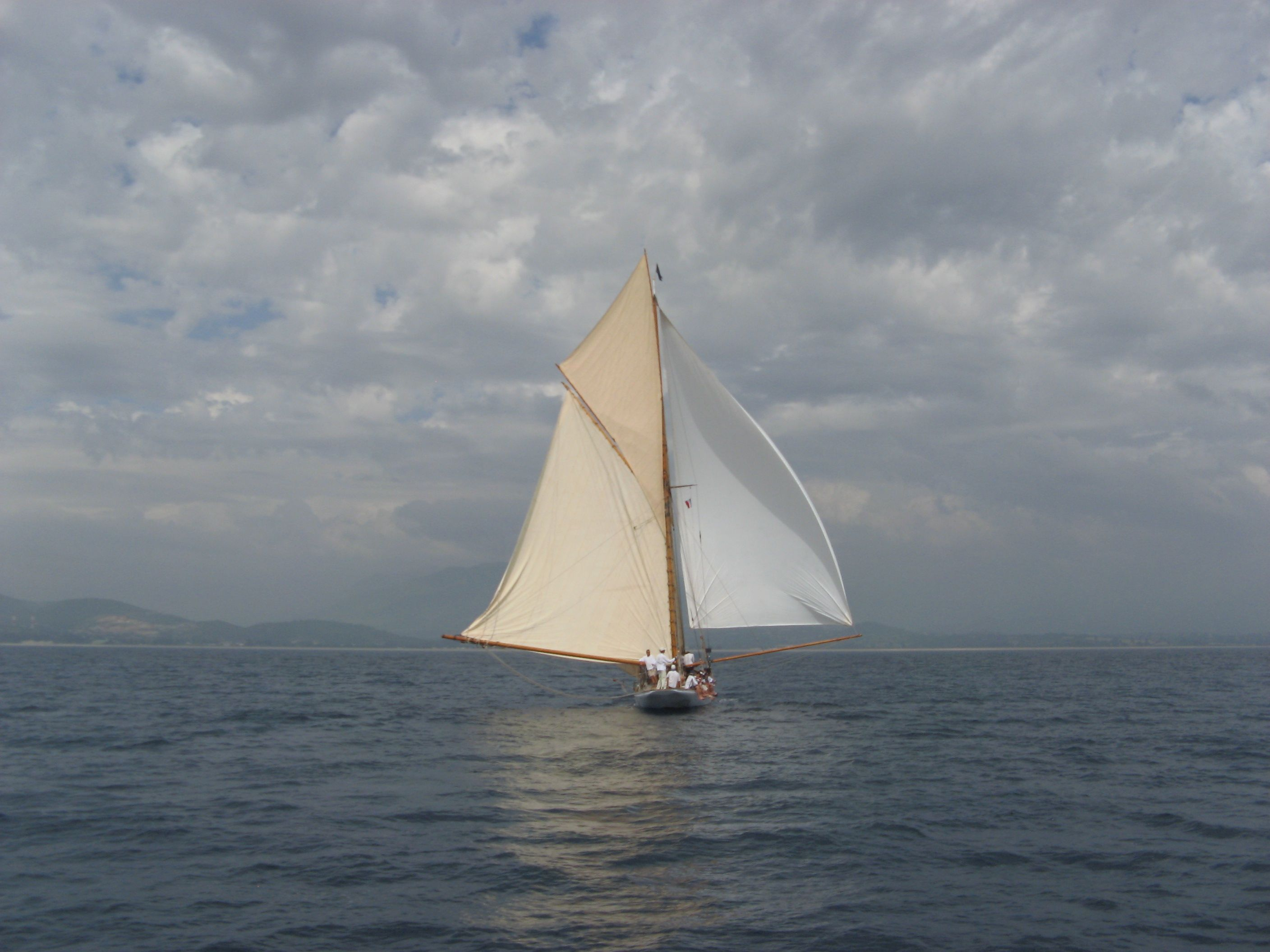
Partridge 1885's Sails

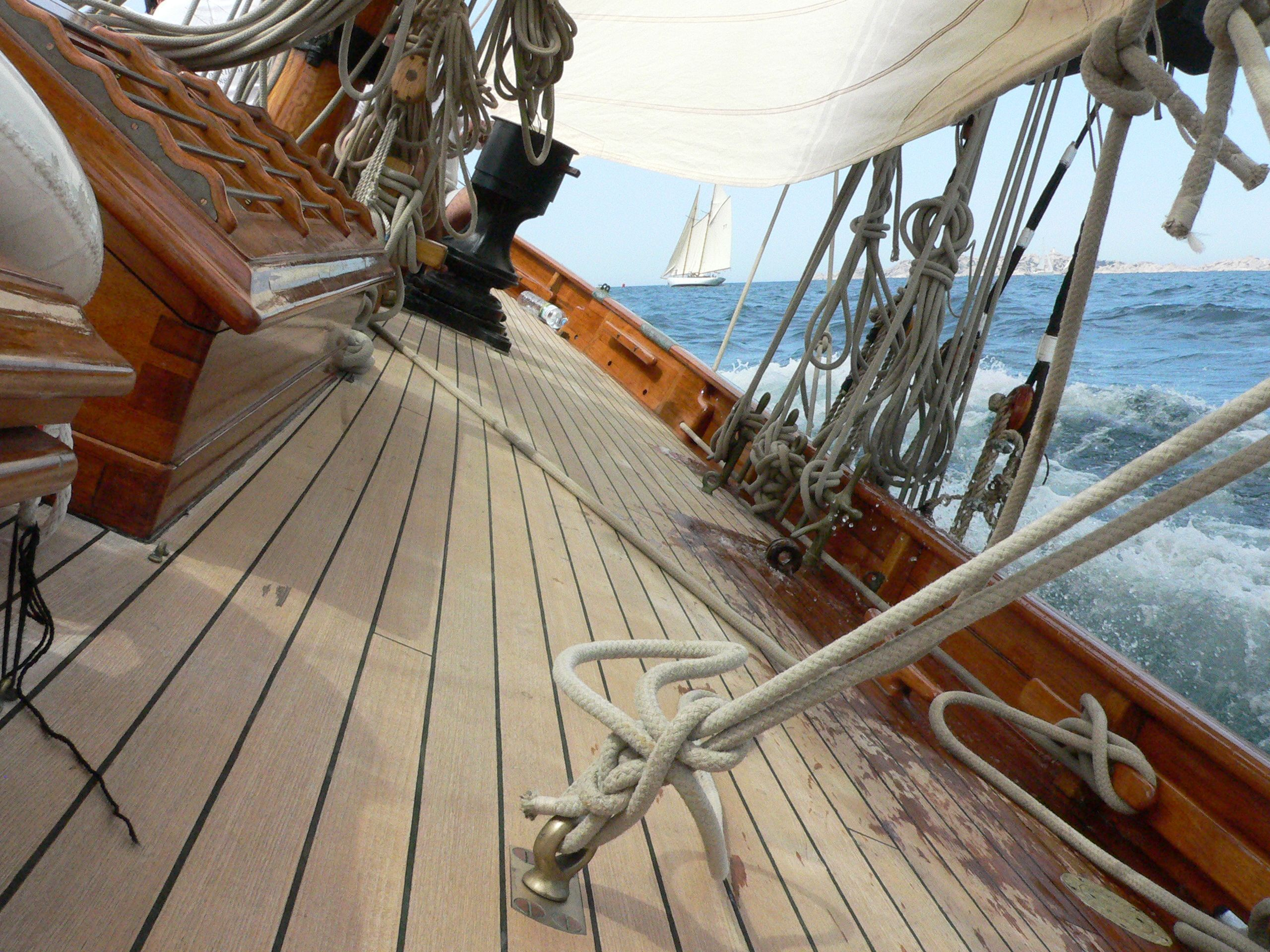
Partridge 1885 - onboard

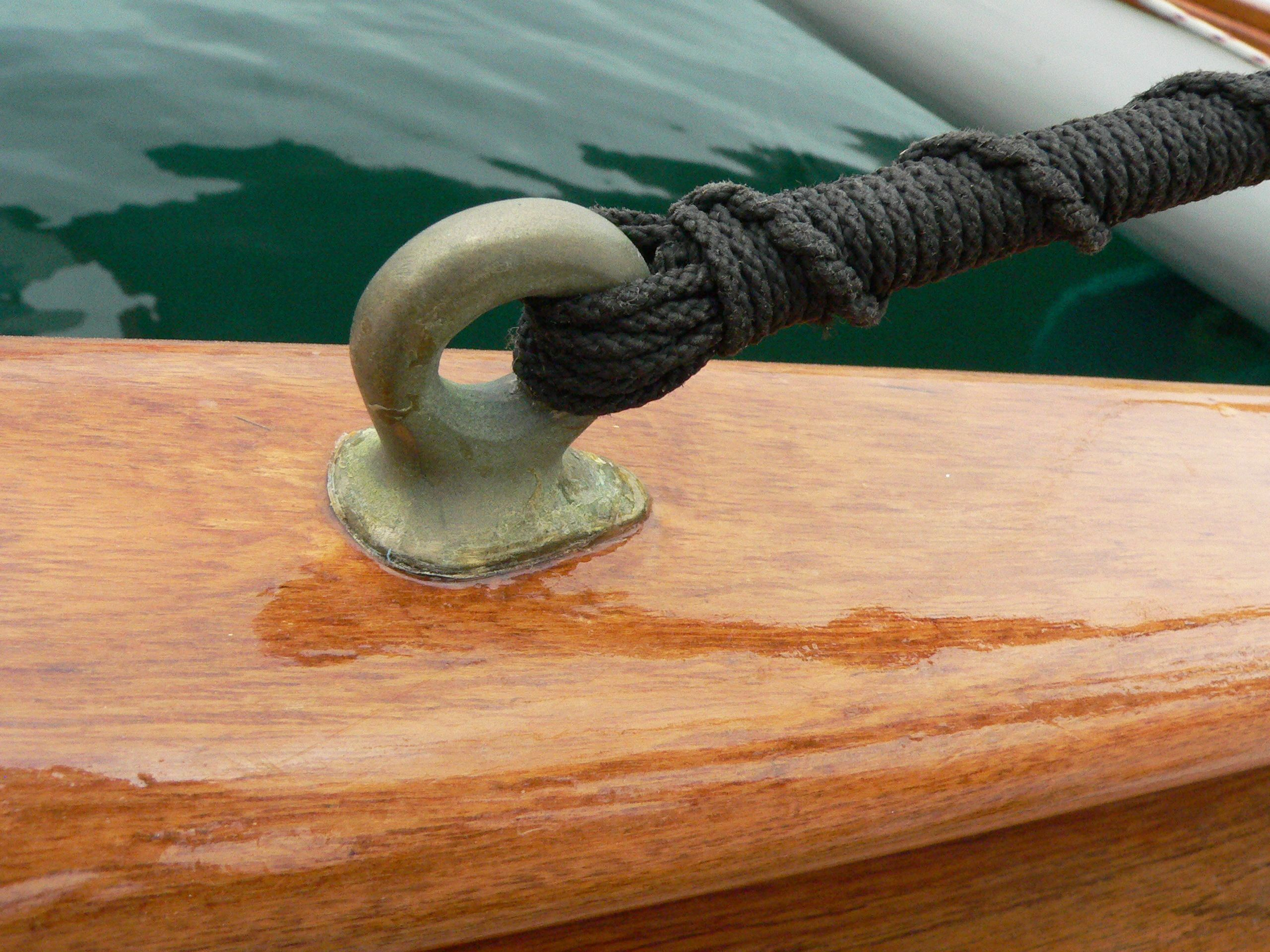
Partridge 1885 - detail

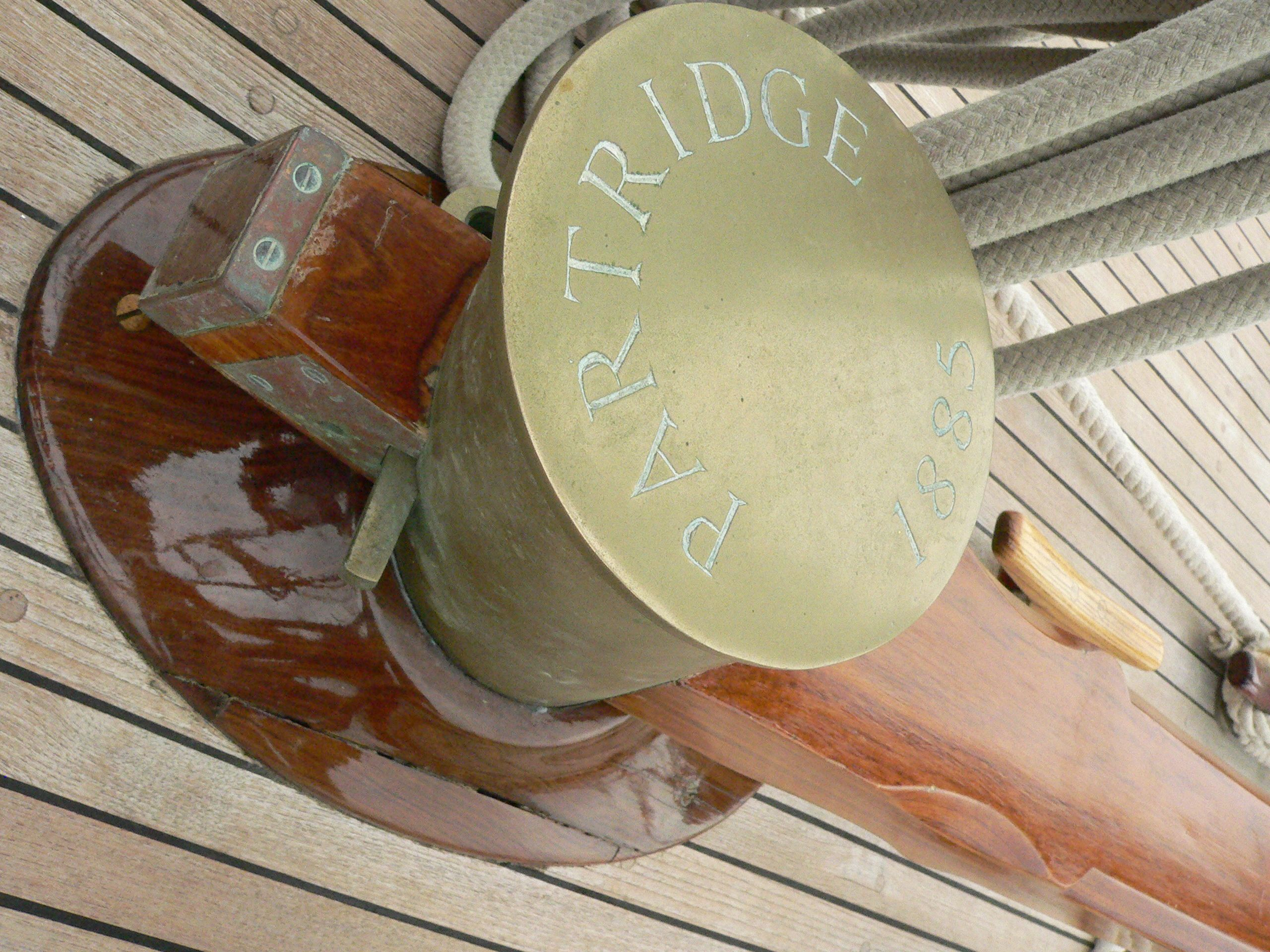
Partridge 1885 - detail

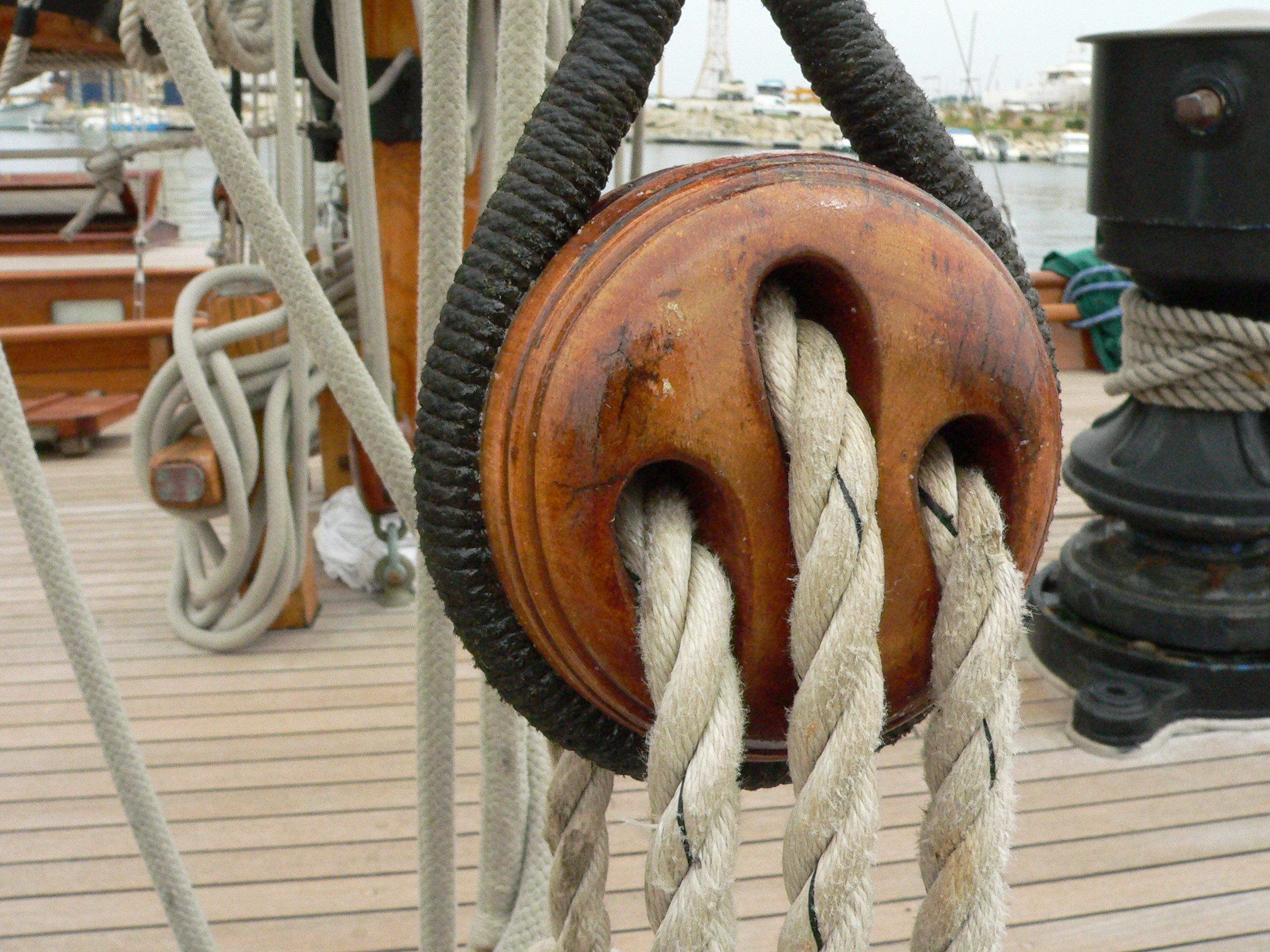
Partridge 1885 - pulley

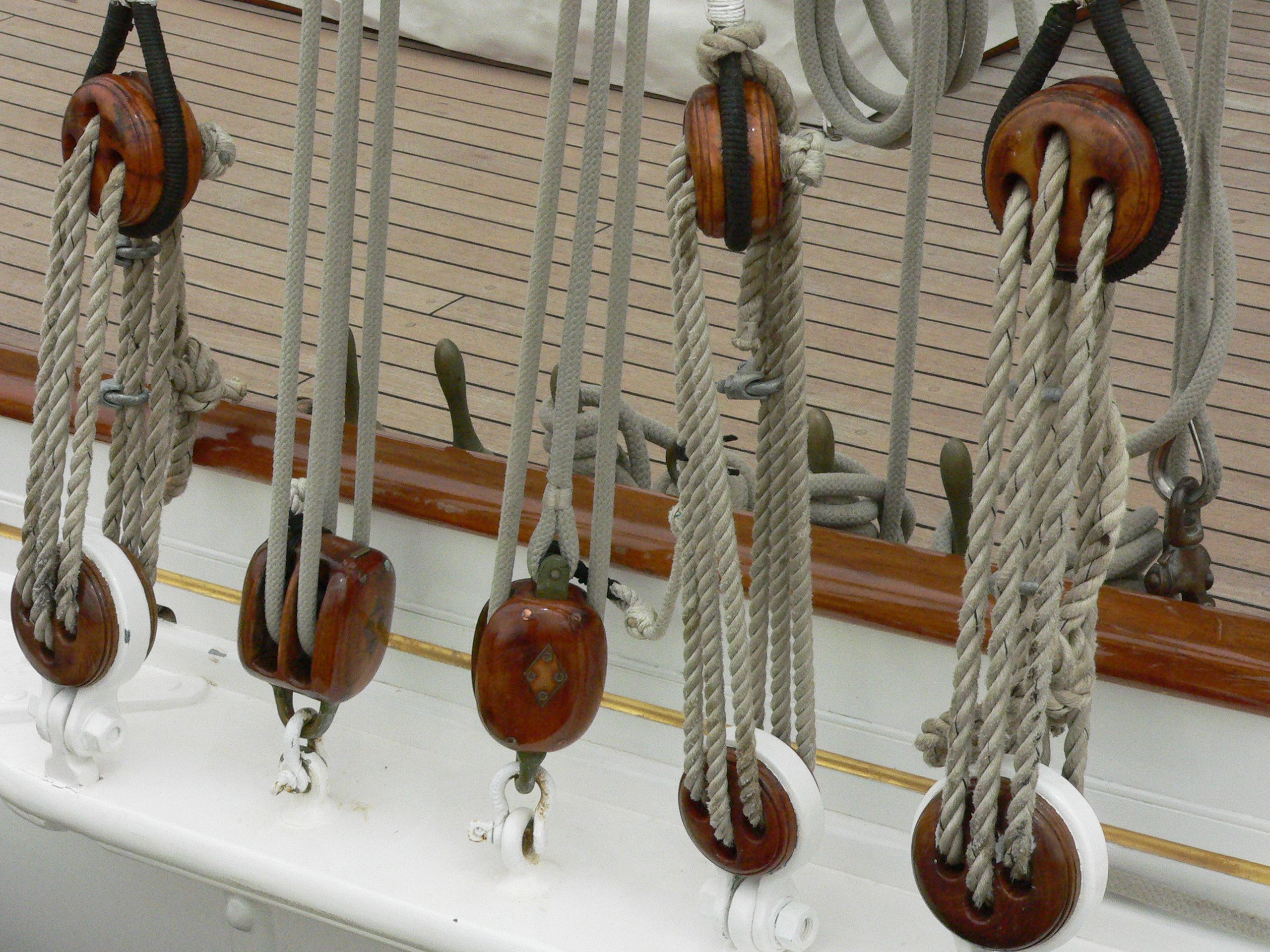
Partridge 1885 - pulleys

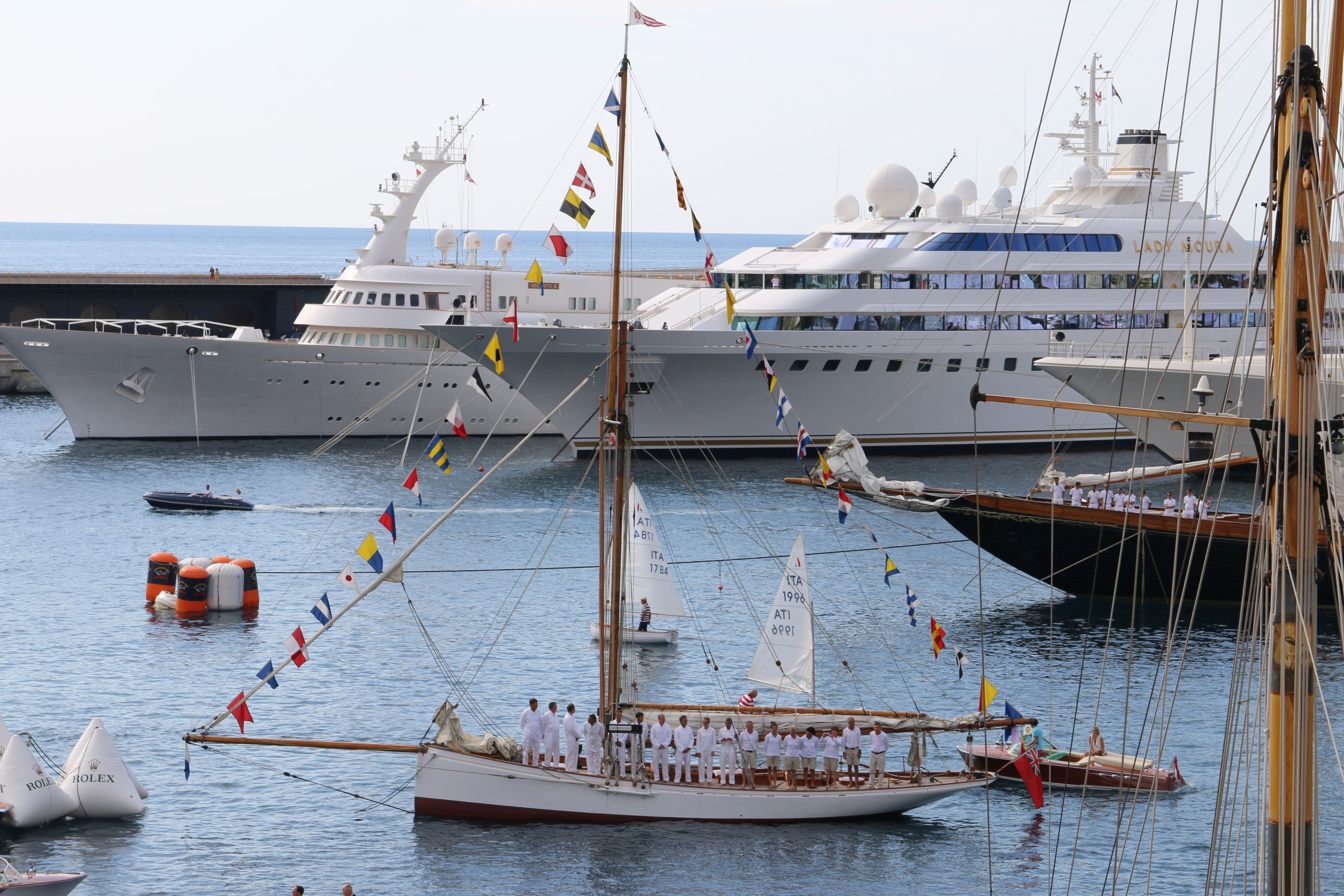
Partridge's 130th Anniversary (1885 - 2015) at the Monaco Yacht Club
