= John Beavor-Webb =

Irish-American naval architect

John Beavor-Webb (c. 1849 - March 11, 1927) was a British and American naval architect. He was a designer of sailing yachts, including Partridge 1885, a UK National Historic Ship and the America's Cup challengers Genesta (1884) and Galatea (1885).

He was born in Kinsale in Ireland in 1849. He was the son of Rev John Beaver Webb (1803-1852) and his wife Maria Susan Maxwell.

John Beavor-Webb began his career as a naval architect in England moved to the U.S.A. around 1887 where he designed very large steamyachts like J.P. Morgan's Corsair II (1891) and Corsair III (1899).

In 1896 he designed the 627 ton SY 'Sovereign' for Matthew Borden, this being built at J.N.Robins of Brooklyn. This was sold to the US Navy in 1898 for $300,000 and renamed USS Scorpion. The ship served in the war with Mexico and was used as a survey base in the creation of the Panama Canal. She was decommissioned in 1928 and broken in 1929.

In 1899 he designed the 1136 ton SY 'Corsair III' for John Pierpoint Morgan. This was built by the T.S. Marvel yard in Newburgh, New York. Usually berthed in the River Hudson near the owner's home. she was also the flagship of the New York Yacht Club. Morgan employed Captain W. B. Porter as her long-term skipper. After Morgan's death in 1913 the ship passed to his son, who moored her at Matinicock Point in Long Island. She was passed to the US Navy in 1917, notionally retaining Porter as skipper. In 1930 she was converted to create USS Oceanographer.

Beaver-Webb died of a stroke of apoplexy on 11 March 1927 at his home of 68 East Eighty Sixth Street New York aged 67 leaving three daughters.

Beavor-Webb was worth "more than $20,000" by the time of his death. His widow was disinherited but his three daughters each received a trust fund with an income for life.
