= Trofeo Almirante Conde de Barcelona =

Sailing competition

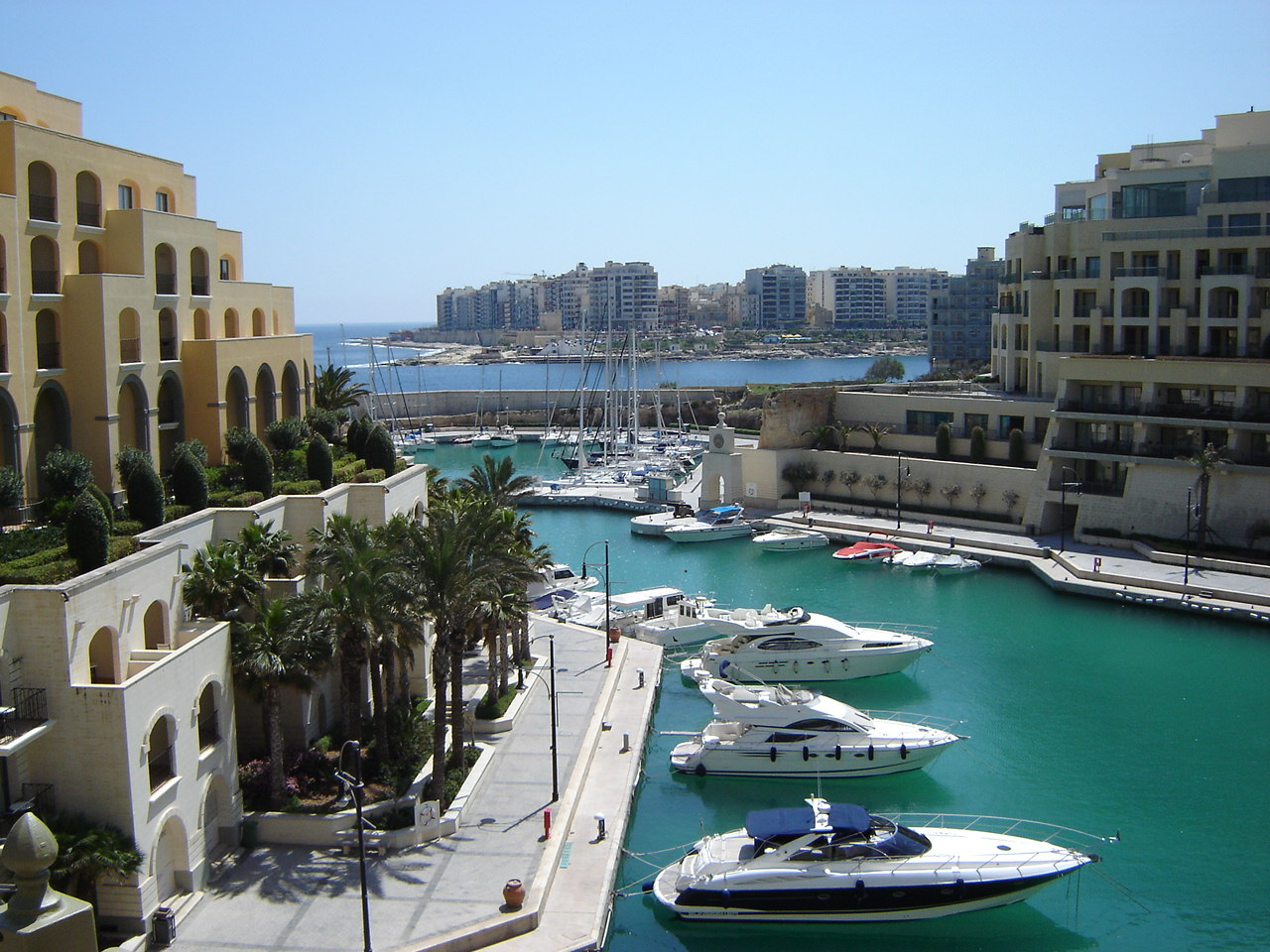

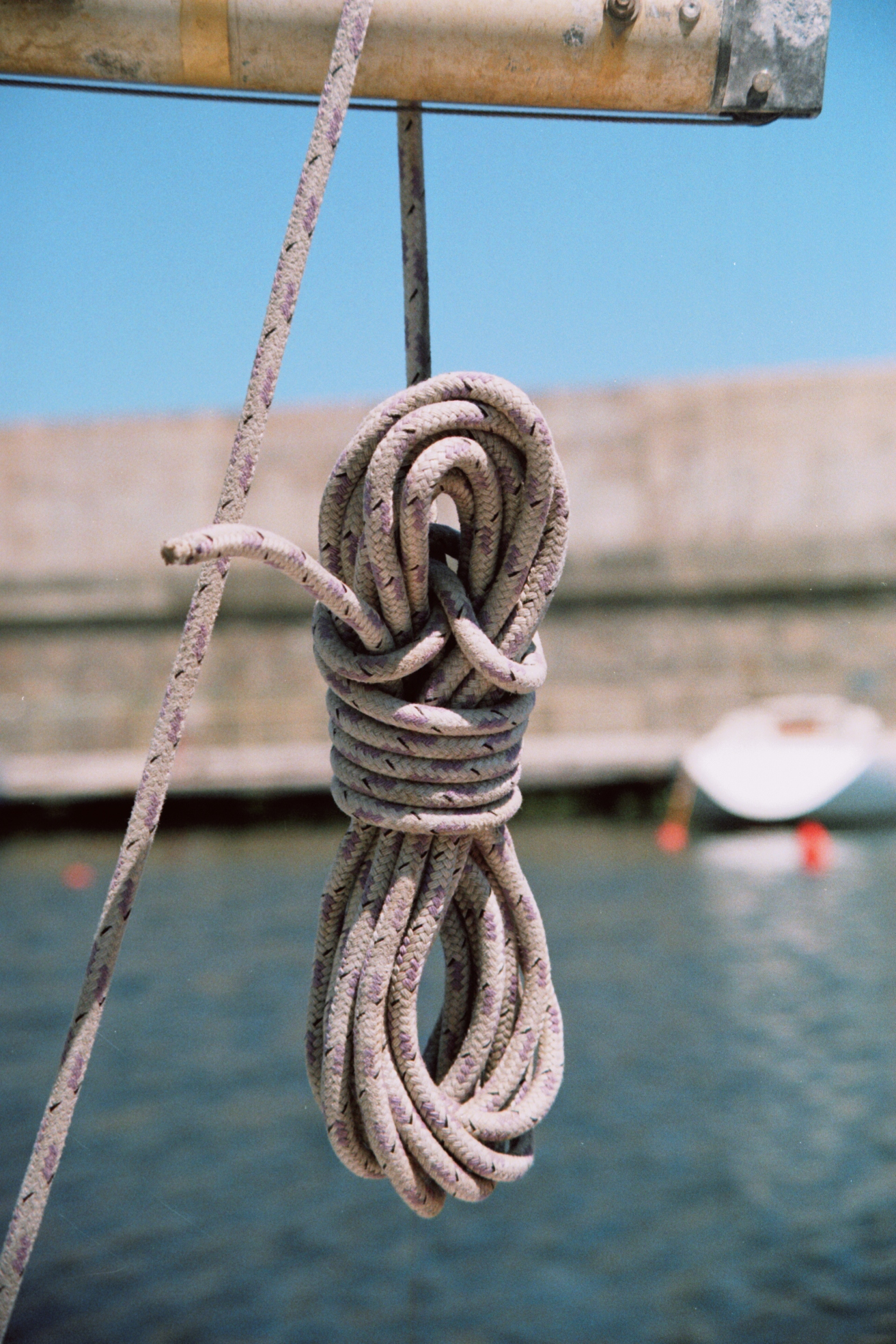

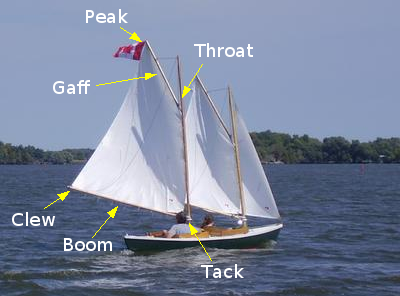

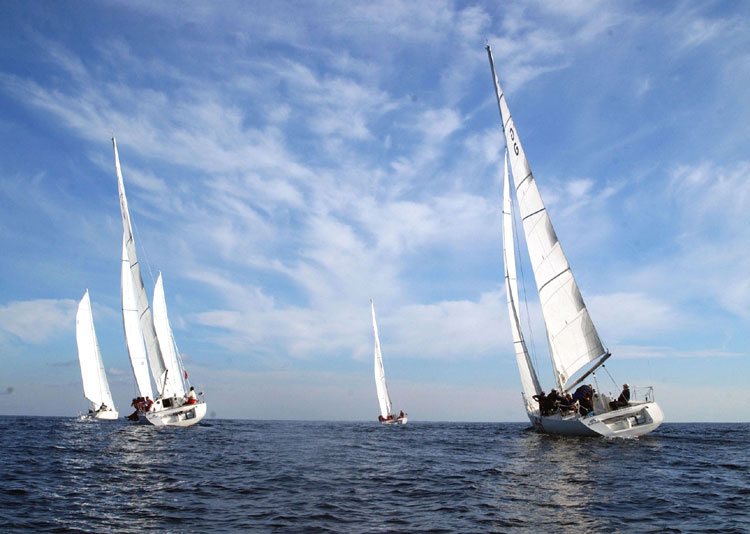

The Trofeo Almirante Conde de Barcelona is an annual sailing competition. The yachts usually start from Mallorca. The name and trophy commercial rights are owned by the merchant "Bono Asociados SL".

There are three categories in the race: Barcos de época, Barcos de clásicos, Espíritu de tradición; that is accordingly with CIM Regulations.

| yacht length | crew |
|---|---|
| 25 m | 20 person |
| 25–20 m | 15 person |
| 20–16 m | 10 person |
| 16–12 m | 8 person |
| 12 m | 5 person |

== Previous winners ==
- I Trofeo 1985 Refanut (Switzerland)
- II Trofeo 1986 Yanira (Spain)
- III Trofeo 1987 Cypsela (Spain)
- IV Trofeo 1988 Yanira (Spain)
- V Trofeo 1989 Sheevra (United States)
- VI Trofeo 1990 Tomahawk (Italy)
- VII Trofeo 1991 Santa Rosa (Peru)
- VIII Trofeo 1992 Ivanhoe (Spain)
- IX Trofeo 1993 Karenita (France)
- X Trofeo 1994 Ivanhoe (Spain)
- XI Trofeo 1995 Solway Maid (U.K.)
- XII Trofeo 1996 Peer Gynt (Germany)
- XIII Trofeo 1997 Mariette of 1915 (U.K.)
- XIV Trofeo 1998 Dorade (Italy)
- XV Trofeo 1999 Navara (U.K.)
- XVI Trofeo 2000 Rosendo (Spain)
- XVII Trofeo 2001 Ilex (Spain)
- XVIII Trofeo 2002 Ilex (Spain)
- XIX Trofeo 2003 Agneta (Germany)
- XX Trofeo 2004 Mercury (Spain)
- XXI Trofeo 2005 Mercury (Spain)
- XXII Trofeo 2006 Altair (U.K)
- XXIII Trofeo 2007 Lak (U.K.)
- XXIV Trofeo 2008 Sonata (Spain)
