= Viktor Balikhin (architect) =

Soviet architect

Viktor Stepanovich Balikhin
- Born: 1893; Moscow
- Died: 1953 (aged 59–60)
- Education: VKhUTEMAS
- Occupation: Architect
- Practice: VKhUTEMAS, ASNOVA

Viktor Stepanovich Balikhin (Russian: Виктор Степанович Балихин, 1893–1953) was a Russian avant-garde architect. He taught at the VKhUTEMAS and was one of the founders of the Association of New Architects (ASNOVA), whose members included Nikolai Ladovsky, Konstantin Melnikov, and El Lissitzky.

== Biography ==
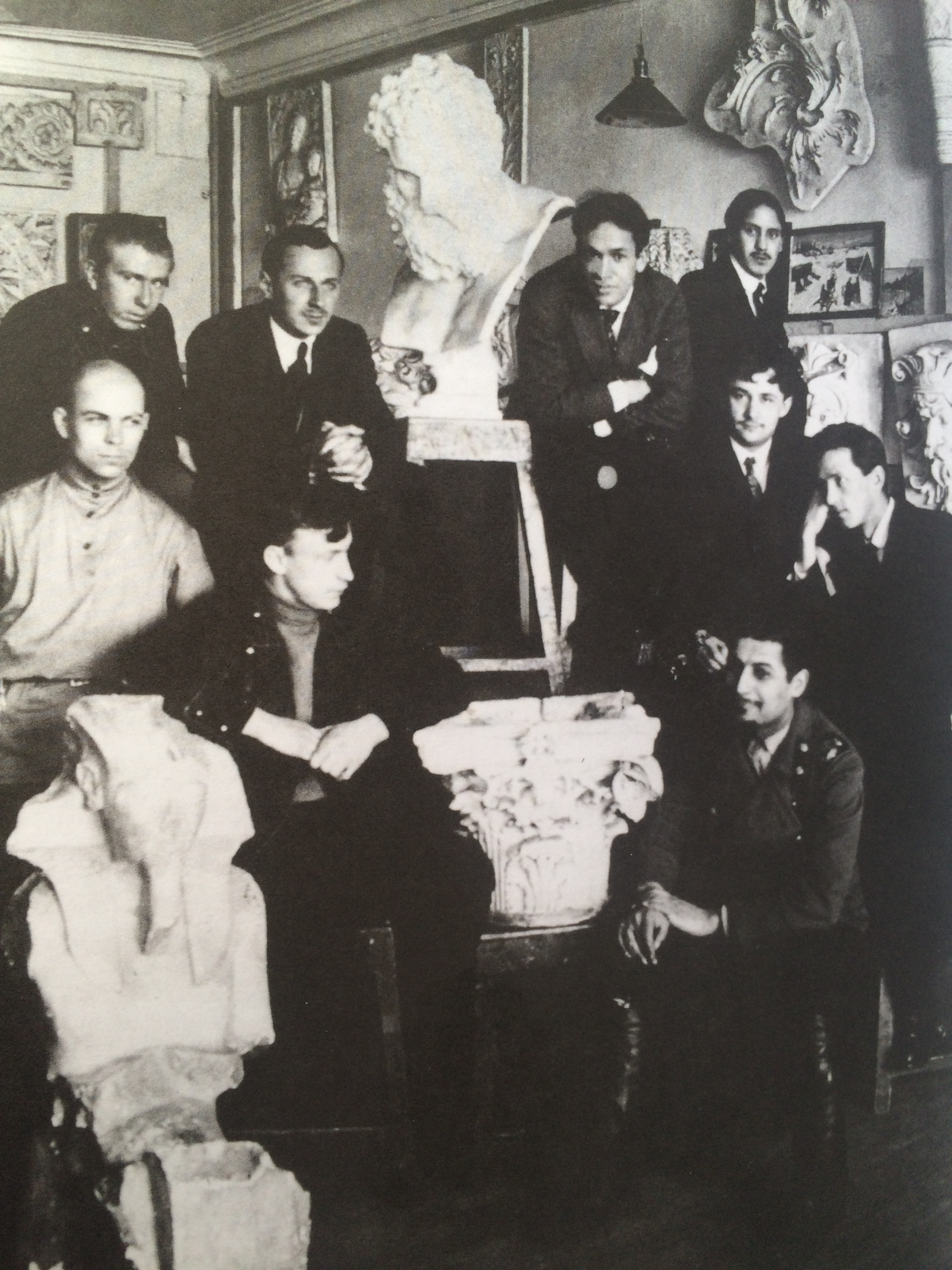
Viktor Balikhin (second row, first from the left) with fellow architecture students at the Moscow School of Painting, Sculpture and Architecture, 1914

Viktor Balikhin was born in Moscow in 1893. He studied architecture at the Moscow School of Painting, Sculpture and Architecture and at Nikolai Ladovsky's United Workshops (OBMAS) at the VKhUTEMAS, from which he graduated with a project for an airport in 1924. From 1923 to 1929, Balikhin taught the propaedeutic course "Space" at the VKhUTEMAS.

Balikhin was one of the founders of the Association of New Architects (ASNOVA, 1923–1932), alongside Nikolai Ladovsky, Vladimir Krinsky, Nikolai Dokuchaev, and others. Konstantin Melnikov joined the association between 1923 and 1924. El Lissitzky designed the only issue of the association's journal Izvestiia ASNOVA (News of ASNOVA) in 1926. After Ladovsky broke away from ASNOVA and formed the Association of Architect-Urbanists (ARU) in 1928, Balikhin became ASNOVA's de facto leader until 1932, when all artistic associations were dissolved.

Balikhin worked collectively with other members of ASNOVA on submissions to architecture competitions, including for a monument to Lenin on the site of the Cathedral of Christ the Saviour in Moscow (with Georgy Krutikov and others, 1924), the All-Union Palace of the Arts in Moscow (with Vladimir Krinsky, Viktor Petrov, Irina Tikhomirova, and others, 1930), and the Palace of the Soviets (with Pyotr Budo, Militsa Prokhorova, Mikhail Turkus, Romuald Iodko, and Flora Sevortian, 1931).

In July 1932, Balikhin and Ladovsky were elected to the board of the newly created Union of Soviet Architects. Balikhin worked at the Academy of Architecture of the USSR during the 1930s.

Balikhin died in 1953.

Balikhin's works were shown at the Paris-Moscou exhibition at the Centre Georges Pompidou in Paris in 1979.

The Canadian Centre for Architecture in Montreal holds the "V.S. Balikhin Archive", which includes photographs of models and plans of projects by Balikhin, his collection of photographs of cities, towns, and projects designed by various architects from 1923 through 1935, as well as an inscribed copy of Balikhin's 1936 article "Iz materialov obsledovaniia arkhitektury zhilykh kompleksov" (From Materials of a Survey of Architecture of Housing Complexes).

== Selected writings ==
- Balikhin, Viktor (1935). "Arkhitektura i skul'ptura" [Architecture and Sculpture]. Arkhitektura SSSR (2): 16–19.
- Balikhin, Viktor (1935). "Sintez iskusstv v praktike sovetskikh arkhitektorov" [The Synthesis of the Arts in the Practice of Soviet Architects]. Arkhitektura SSSR (7): 20–26.
- Balikhin, Viktor (1936). "Iz materialov obsledovaniia arkhitektury zhilykh kompleksov" [From Materials of a Survey of Architecture of Housing Complexes]. In Aleksandrov, A.Ia. (ed.). Problemy arkhitektury: sbornik materialov, tom I, kniga 1 [Problems of Architecture: Collection of Materials, Vol. I, Book 1]. Moscow: Izdatel'stvo vsesoiuznoi akademii arkhitektury. pp. 191–216.
