= ASNOVA =

Soviet Russian avant-garde architectural association (1923–1932)

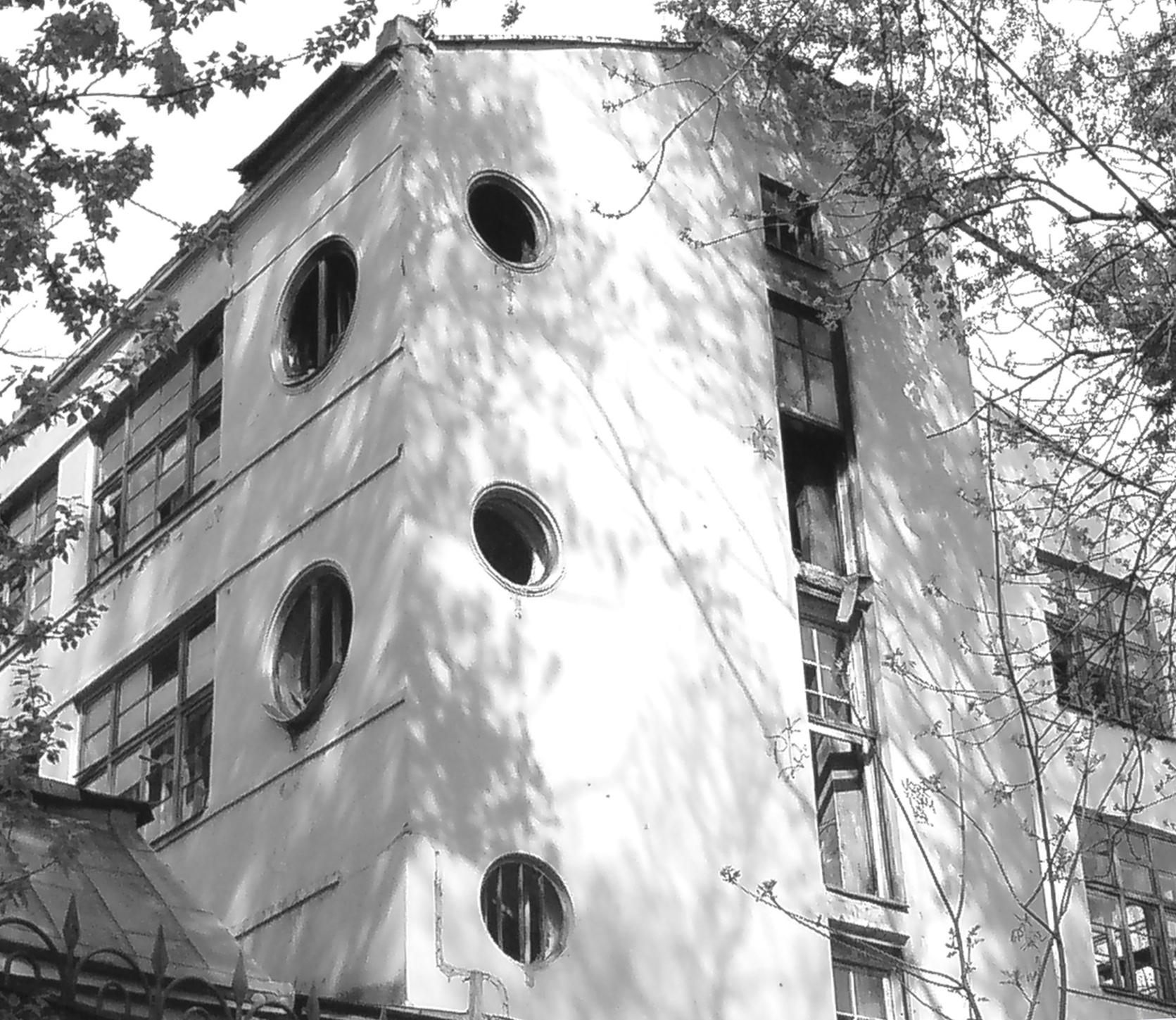
The print shop of "Ogonyok" magazine designed by El Lissitzky

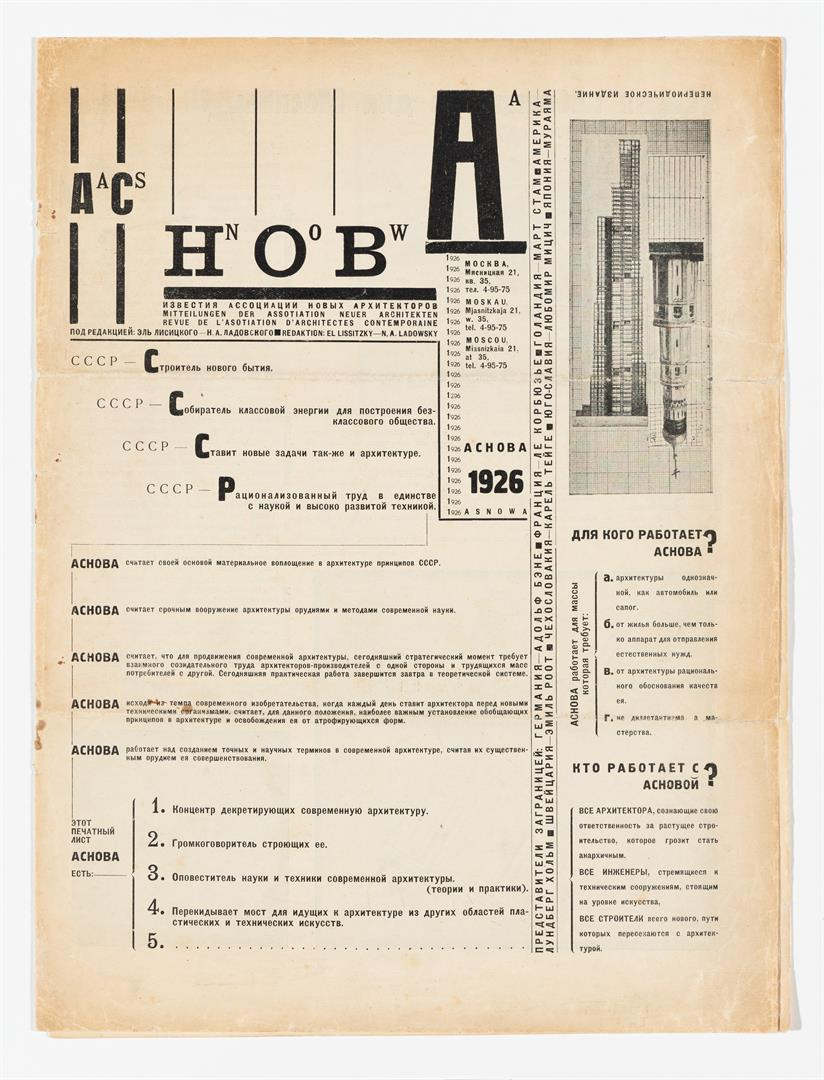
Izvestiia ASNOVA, no. 1 (1926), designed by El Lissitzky

ASNOVA (Russian: АСсоциация НОВых Архитекторов (АСНОВА), lit. 'Association of New Architects') was an avant-garde architectural association in the Soviet Union, which was active in the 1920s and early 1930s, commonly called 'the Rationalists'.

The association was started in 1923 by Nikolai Ladovsky, a teacher at VKhUTEMAS and member of INKhUK, along with other avant-garde architects such as Vladimir Krinsky and Viktor Balikhin. Ladovsky's teaching, although definitively modernist was nevertheless more 'intuitive' than functionalist, and was partly based on gestalt psychology. In 1919 Ladovsky defined architectural rationalism as 'the economy of psychic energy in the perception of spatial and functional aspects of a building', as opposed to a 'technical rationalism'. The group's researches were particularly influenced by the work of Hugo Münsterberg, and Ladovsky built a psychotechnical laboratory in 1926 based on Münsterberg's theory of industrial psychology. In general the group concentrated on creating 'psycho-organisational' effects (as Ladovsky put it) with architecture: a sculptural rather than functional approach, leading to accusations of 'formalism' by the nascent OSA Group. ASNOVA and OSA engaged in polemics over terminology and the claim to 'constructivism'.

The group received a boost when El Lissitzky became a proponent in the mid-1920s, designing the one issue of the journal ASNOVA News (Izvestiia ASNOVA) in 1926. In addition Konstantin Melnikov, then as now the most famous Soviet Modernist architect, was a member of the group at one point, preferring its concentration on affect and intuition to the OSA's scientific precision: although he and Ilya Golosov would form a 'centre' group between ASNOVA and OSA. Berthold Lubetkin, better known for his work in London, was also an early associate of the group. The 1928 'flying city' of Georgy Krutikov was an ASNOVA project that was both famous and notorious for its utopianism, inflected with motifs from science fiction.

ASNOVA members were prolific in paper projects and competitions but built rarely. Members Melnikov and Ladovsky were awarded first and second place respectively in the competition for the Soviet pavilion at the 1925 Paris exhibition. A few realized projects survive in the former USSR. Most notable are Ladovsky's apartment block on Tverskaya in Moscow (1929) and a series of three 'social condenser' kitchens and communal facilities built in Leningrad between 1928 and 1931 by an ASNOVA team made up of A. K. Barutchev, I. A. Gilter, I.A. Meerzon and Yakov Rubanchik. ASNOVA split in 1928 when Ladovsky set up his own group, the ARU (Association of Architect-Urbanists), although ASNOVA joint entries were made for the Palace of Soviets competition. The group was dissolved in 1932 along with all other artistic associations.
