= Viktor Balikhin =

Viktor Balikhin may refer to:

- Viktor Balikhin (athlete) (born 1938), Soviet hurdler
- Viktor Balikhin (architect) (1893–1953), Russian avant-garde architect
