= Yakov Rubanchik =

Soviet Russian architect and artist

Yakov Osipovich Rubanchik
- Born: June 29, 1899; Taganrog
- Died: December 20, 1948 (aged 49); Leningrad
- Occupation: Architect

Yakov Osipovich Rubanchik (June 29, 1899 – December 20, 1948) was a Soviet Russian architect and artist.

== Biography ==
Yakov Rubanchik was born into a photographer's family in the city of Taganrog in 1899. Studied at the Taganrog Boys Gymnasium.

Graduated from Petrograd-based Vhutein (Higher Art and Technical Institute) in 1928. In summer of 1929 Rubanchik came to his home city Taganrog to make sketches of buildings in historical downtown.

In early 1930s, Rubanchik was part of the Leningrad-based ASNOVA (Russian: АСНОВА; abbreviation for Ассоциация новых архитекторов, "Association of New Architects"), an Avant-Garde architectural association in the Soviet Union, which was active in the 1920s and early 1930s, commonly called 'the Rationalists'. Designed several projects of factory-kitchen buildings, such as the factory-kitchen of the Vyborg District of Leningrad. In 1933-1941 was director of Workshop 1 of the Leningrad-based Russian State Research and Design Institute of Urbanism (GIPROGOR).

In 1935 Yakov Rubanchik released a project of reconstruction of Taganrog.

== External links and references ==
- WWII drawings by Yakov Rubanchik
- "рхитектор Рубанчик Я. О., здания" 54 buildings designed or co-designed by Yakov Rubanchik, mostly in Stalinist Neoclassicism.
- Berkovich, Gary. Reclaiming a History. Jewish Architects in Imperial Russia and the USSR. Volume 3. Socialist Realism: 1933–1955. Weimar und Rostock: Grunberg Verlag. 2022. P. 105. ISBN 978-3-933713-64-3.
