= Ogoniok =

Defunct Russian weekly magazine (1899–2020)

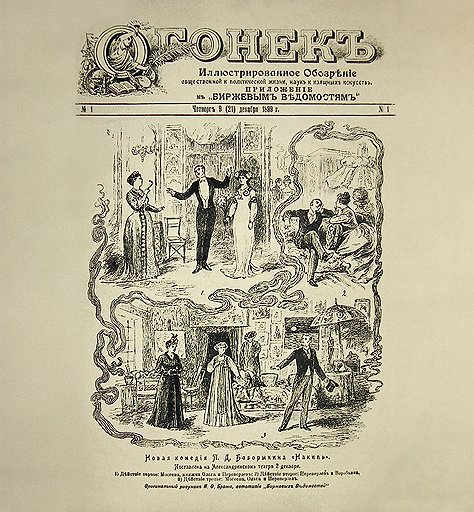
- Frequency: Weekly
- First issue: 21 December 1899
- Final issue: 21 December 2020
- Company: Kommersant Publishing Group
- Country: Russia
- Based in: Moscow
- Language: Russian
- Website: Ogoniok

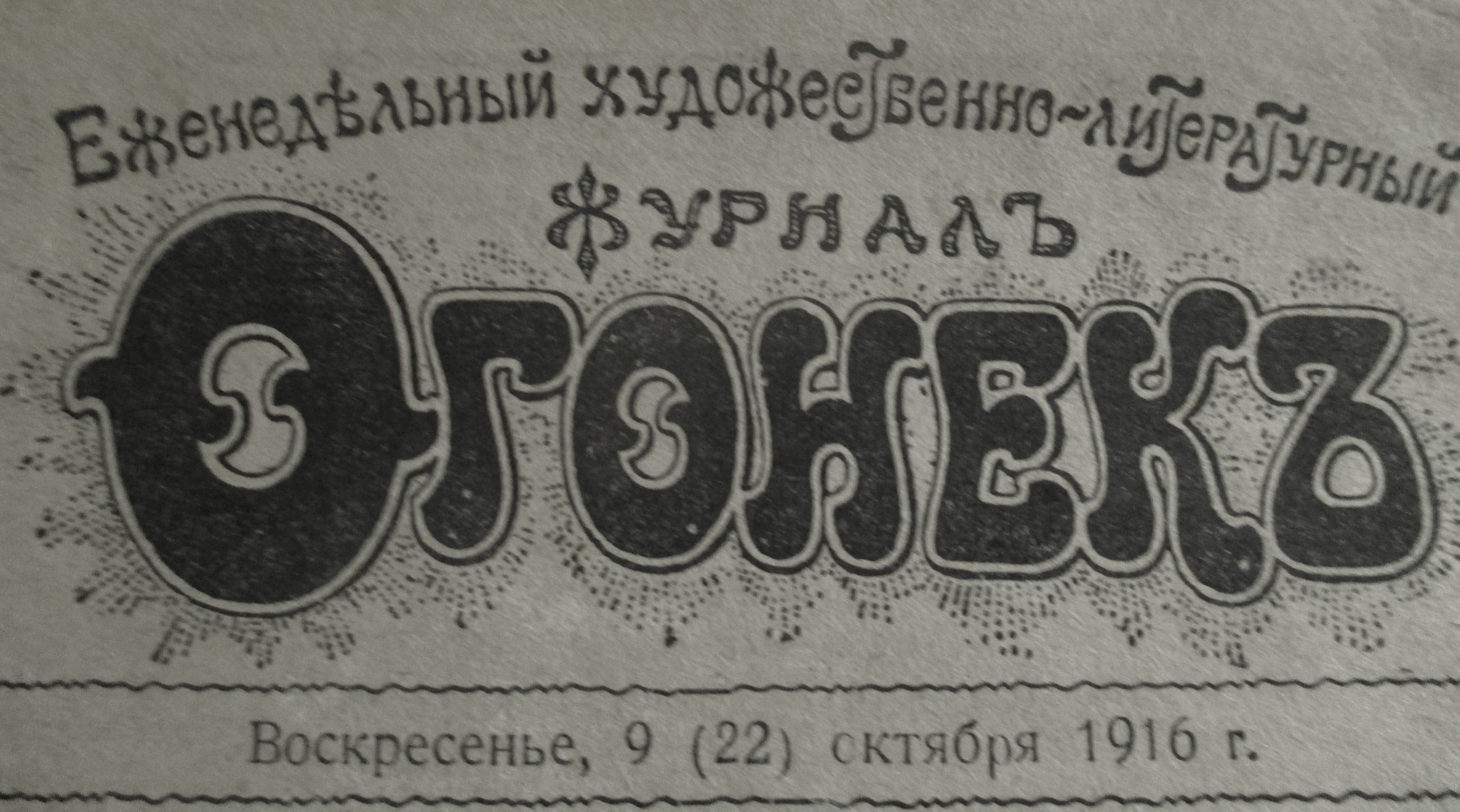
Logotype

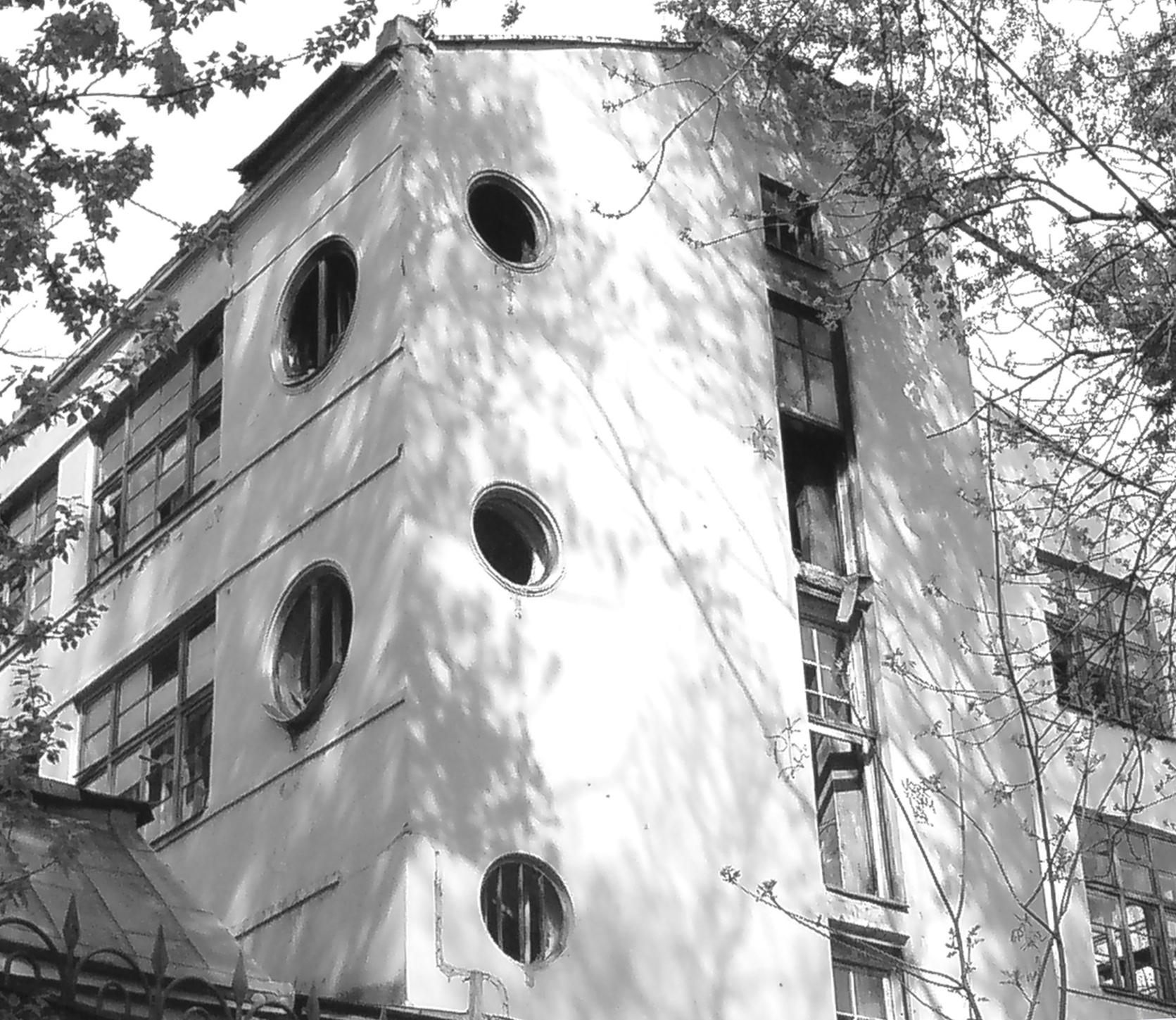
The print shop of Ogonyok magazine designed by El Lissitzky

Ogoniok (Note: Russian: Огонёк, romanized: Ogonyók, IPA: [ɐɡɐˈnʲɵk], lit. 'Spark'; pre-reform orthography: Огонекъ) was a Russian and Soviet weekly magazine which was circulated from 1899 to 2020. It was one of the oldest weekly illustrated magazines in Russia.

== History and profile ==
Ogoniok was first issued on 21 December [O.S. 9 December] 1899 (earlier a magazine with the same name was published in 1879–1883). It ceased to be published in 1918 and was re-established in the Soviet Union in 1923 by Mikhail Koltsov. The headquarters is in Moscow. In 1957 the circulation of the magazine was 850,000 copies.

The colour magazine reached the pinnacle of its popularity in the Perestroika years, when its editor-in-chief Vitaly Korotich "was guiding Ogoniok to a pro-American and pro-capitalist position". Those years are the subject matter of the book Small Fires: Letters From the Soviet People to Ogonyok Magazine 1987-1990 (Summit Books, New York, 1990) selected and edited by Christopher Cerf, Marina Albee, and with an introduction by Korotich. The magazine sold 1.5 million copies in 1987 and 4.6 million copies in 1990.

In the early 1990s, Ogoniok was owned by Boris Berezovsky, and its popularity started to decline. It sold 0.2 million copies in 1993. Viktor Loshak, the former editor of Moskovskiye Novosti, took over as editor in 2003. As of 2004, it was published by the Russian OVA-PRESS publishing house. At the height of the 2008–2009 Russian financial crisis, in January 2009, the publication was suspended due to an ownership change.

After a four-month break, publication of Ogoniok was resumed on 18 May 2009, by Kommersant Publishing Group. The first issue published by Kommersant is the 5079th Ogoniok since 1899.

In December 2020, release of Ogoniok was suspended due to financial problems.

== See also ==
- List of literary magazines
