= House-commune =

Soviet architectural and social movement

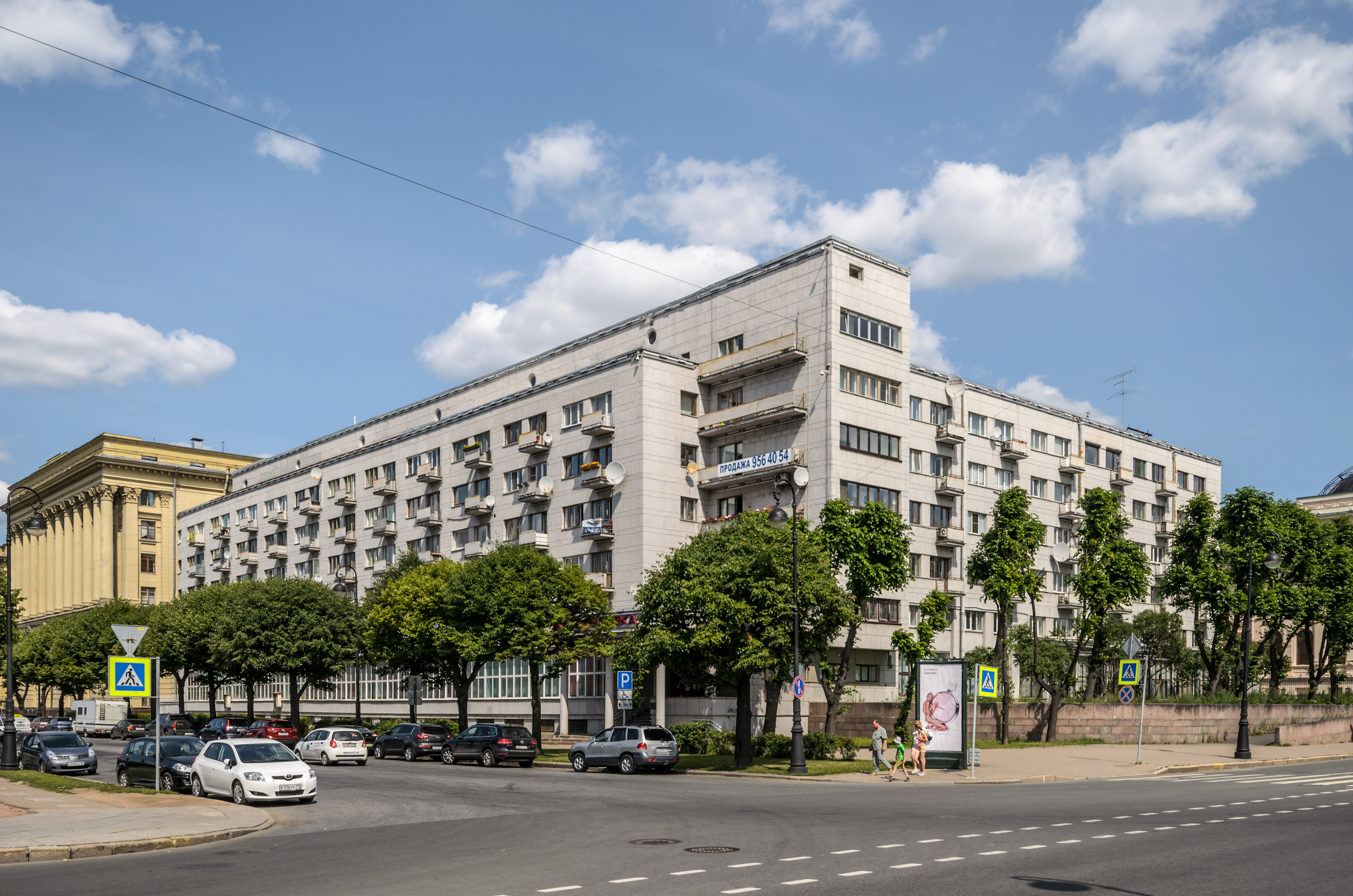
A house-commune in Saint Petersburg, Russia

A house-commune (Russian: дом-коммуна) was an architectural and social movement in early Soviet Union of 1920–1930s. The purpose of the house-communes was to get rid of "the yoke of the household economy".

The idea of a house-commune is borrowed from phalanstères of utopian socialists. These phalanstères were developed primarily from the earlier 19th century intelligentsia and early revolutionary Russian thinking that emerged in association with the preconception of an idealized form of the peasant mir system. Within their ideological context, the mir was supposed to be run by communal governance, equality, and sharing associated with the traditional way of living and surviving in rural villages. The Russian mir was seen as a possible model to emulate as, in its idealized form, it represented the core principle of egalitarianism, collective association and community partnership.

The O.S.A group (Organization of Contemporary Architects) was active between 1925 and 1930 and embraced this phalanstères concept, using it as a basis for constructing mass housing. The O.S.A. saw the house commune as the way to solve the overcrowding seen in Moscow while streamlining the usage of resources that were thought to be wasted due to bourgeois excess caused by individualistic habits. The major drive in the O.S.A. schemes and ideological campaign was to instill this type of “collectivist-social” psychology and replace individualism with the mentality and practicality envisioned by these communal living plans.

In 1928, Tsentrozhilsoyuz (Общесоюзный центр жилищно-строительной и жилищно-арендной кооперации) issued the "Typical Statute of the House-Commune" (Типовое положение о доме-коммуне), which called for communal education of children, food preparation, household chores and recreation.

In the cities of Barshch and V.M. Vladimirov in 1929, there was a house commune scheme that involved “two intersecting buildings with 1,000 adults in one, 360 preschoolers in the left intersections, and 320 schoolchildren to the right.” This facility had a communal dining room equipped with a “conveyor-belt table”; the adults dined with the older children, with access down the halls to visit the younger children.

== The social kitchen ==
Due to its heavy influence from the traditional cultural life, the kitchen, previously being the center of the nuclear family, took on a larger role as the center of the commune. “Classical House Commune theory” promoted the collectivized kitchen and communal dining to improve the efficiency of kitchen work and to build up community by eating together while also rescuing housewives from “the slavery of kitchen life.” This was supposed to be an extension of the typical family function to that of the entire commune, so in addition to removing women from being bound to housework drudgery, this theory promoted “de-familization” and separation of children and parents within the house commune, though this idea met with resistance. In his “Problems of the Scientific Organization of Everyday Life” (1930), V. Kuzmin argued that it is an architect's mission to help accomplish the house commune's improved efficiency and organization achieved by de-familization and the system of “supercollectivism” .

== See also ==
- Factory-kitchen
- Communal apartment
- Kibbutz
