= Factory-kitchen =

Large food production and communal dining spaces in the early Soviet Union

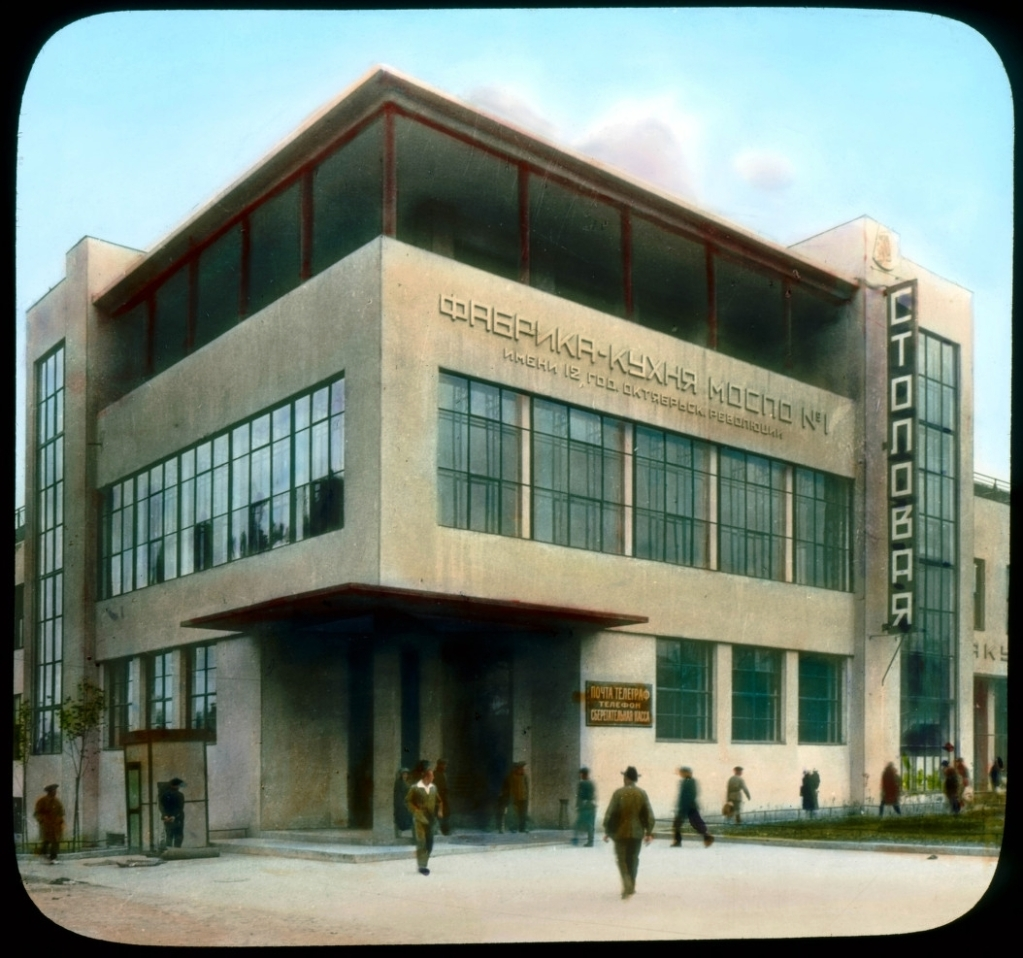
Kitchen-factory No. 1, Moscow (1931)

A factory-kitchen or kitchen factory (Russian: Фабрика-кухня) was a large mechanized enterprise of food service in the Soviet Union, originated in the 1920–1930s. Its main purpose was centralized preparation of food (both prefabrication and full processing) supplied for communal dining rooms or for personal purchase. Factory-kitchens were characteristic of their unique architecture. Sometimes the term is inadequately translated as communal kitchen, the latter being a kitchen in a Soviet communal apartment.

The idea of centralized food preparation was part of the emancipation of women from the household work in the early Soviet Union, and to better tap into women's workforce. Along with the house-communes, factory-kitchens were to get rid of "the yoke of the household economy". Slogans of the day were "Away with Pots and Pans!" and "The Saucepan is an Enemy of the Party Cell".

Various Soviet writers described how "a single person can prepare from fifty to hundred dinners a day". A children's book A Cook for a Whole City described in detail how efficiently a kitchen-factory works.
