= Vladimir Krinsky =

Russian artist and architect

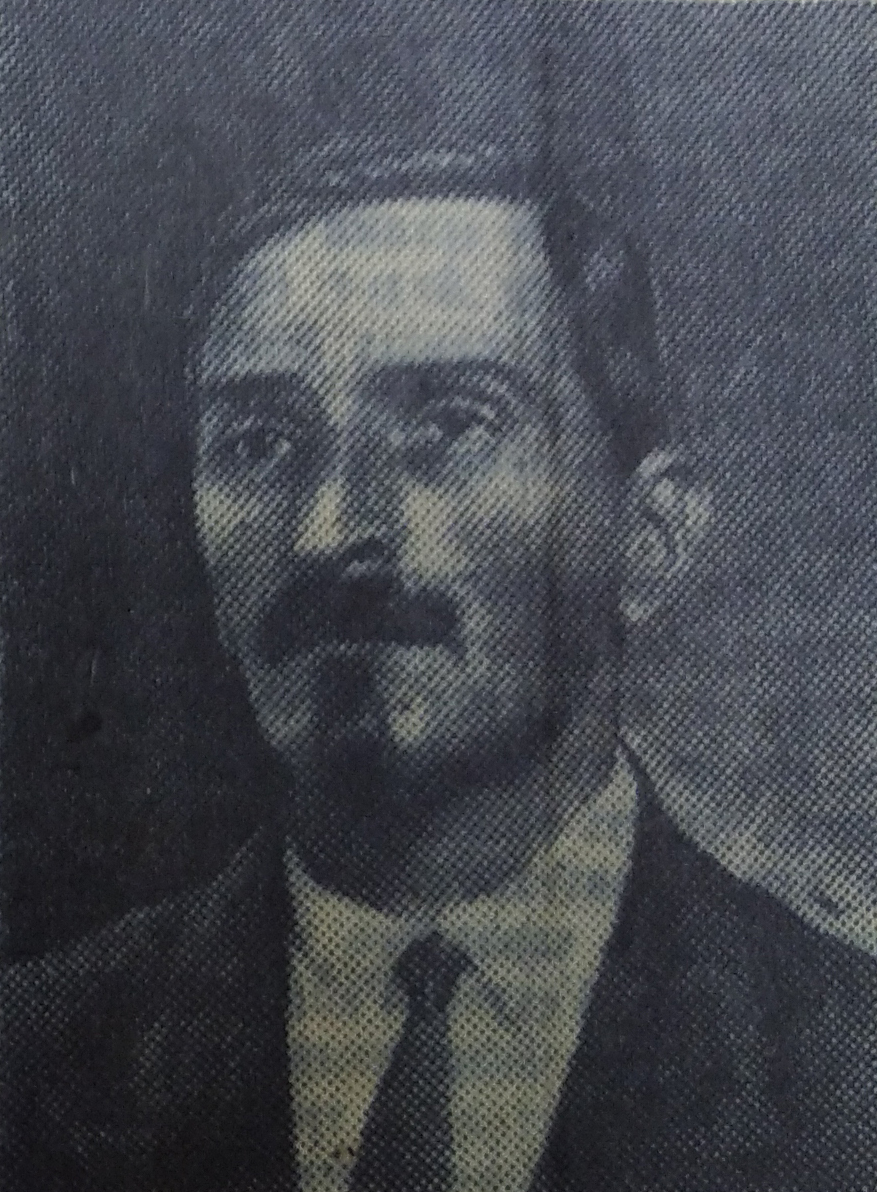

Vladimir Fyodorovich Krinsky (Владимир Фёдорович Кринский; 19 December 1890 – 2 April 1971) was a Russian artist and architect active with the ASNOVA architectural organisation and linked with the Cologne Progressives.

Krinsky was born in Ryazan, Ryazan Oblast. From 1910 to 1917 he studied architecture at the Imperial Academy of Arts. After the Russian Revolution he worked for both the Moscow City Duma and Narkompros. He went on to teach at Vkhutemas.

He died in Moscow in 1971 and is buried in the Novodevichy Cemetery.

== Architectural work ==
- Lock No. 8, Moscow (1937)
- North River Station, Moscow (1937)
