= Printing plant of Ogonyok magazine =

Landmark building in Moscow, Russia

Coordinates: 55.777277°N 37.610828°E

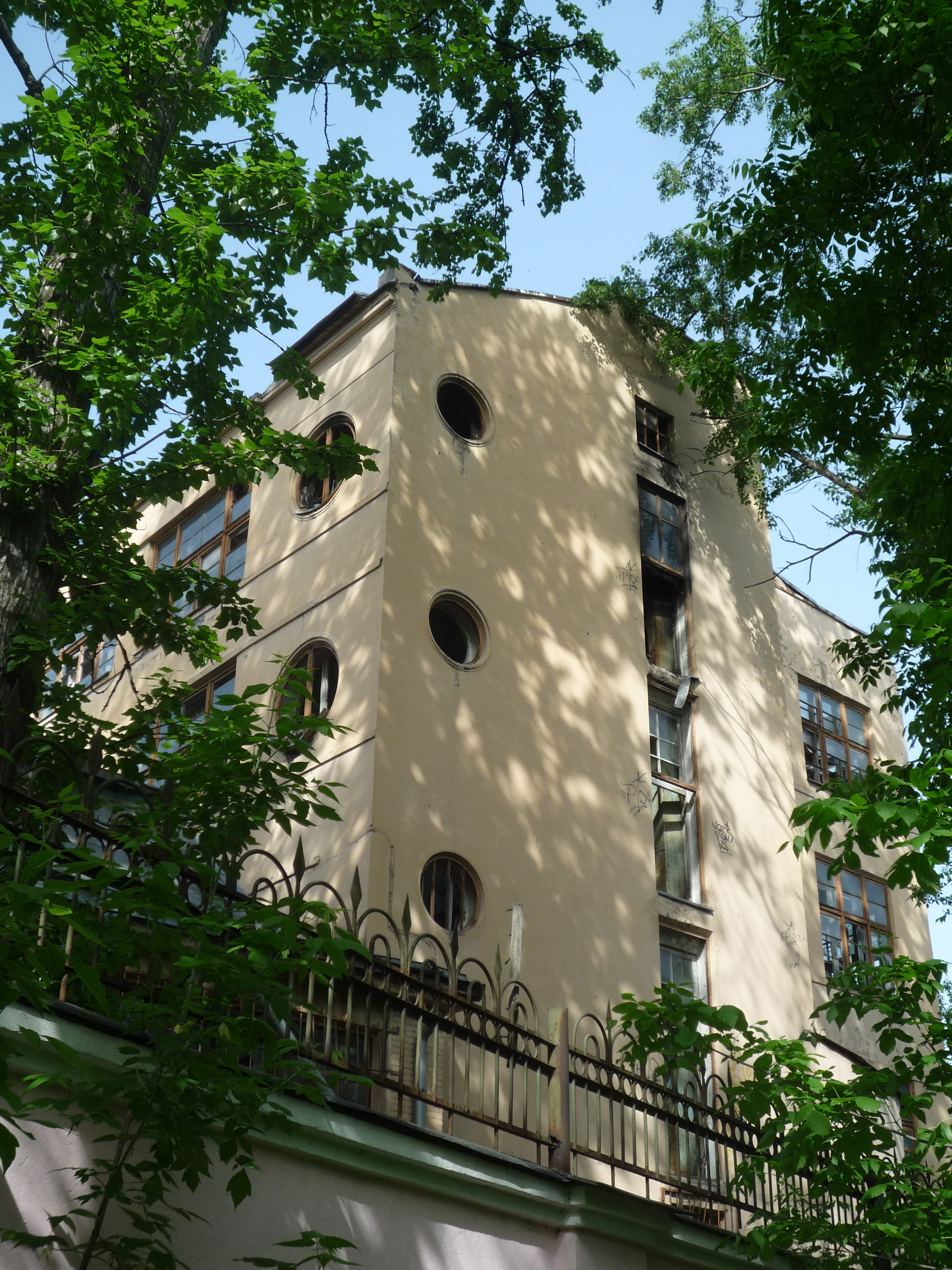
The print shop designed by El Lissitzky, showing the least damaged south end of the building

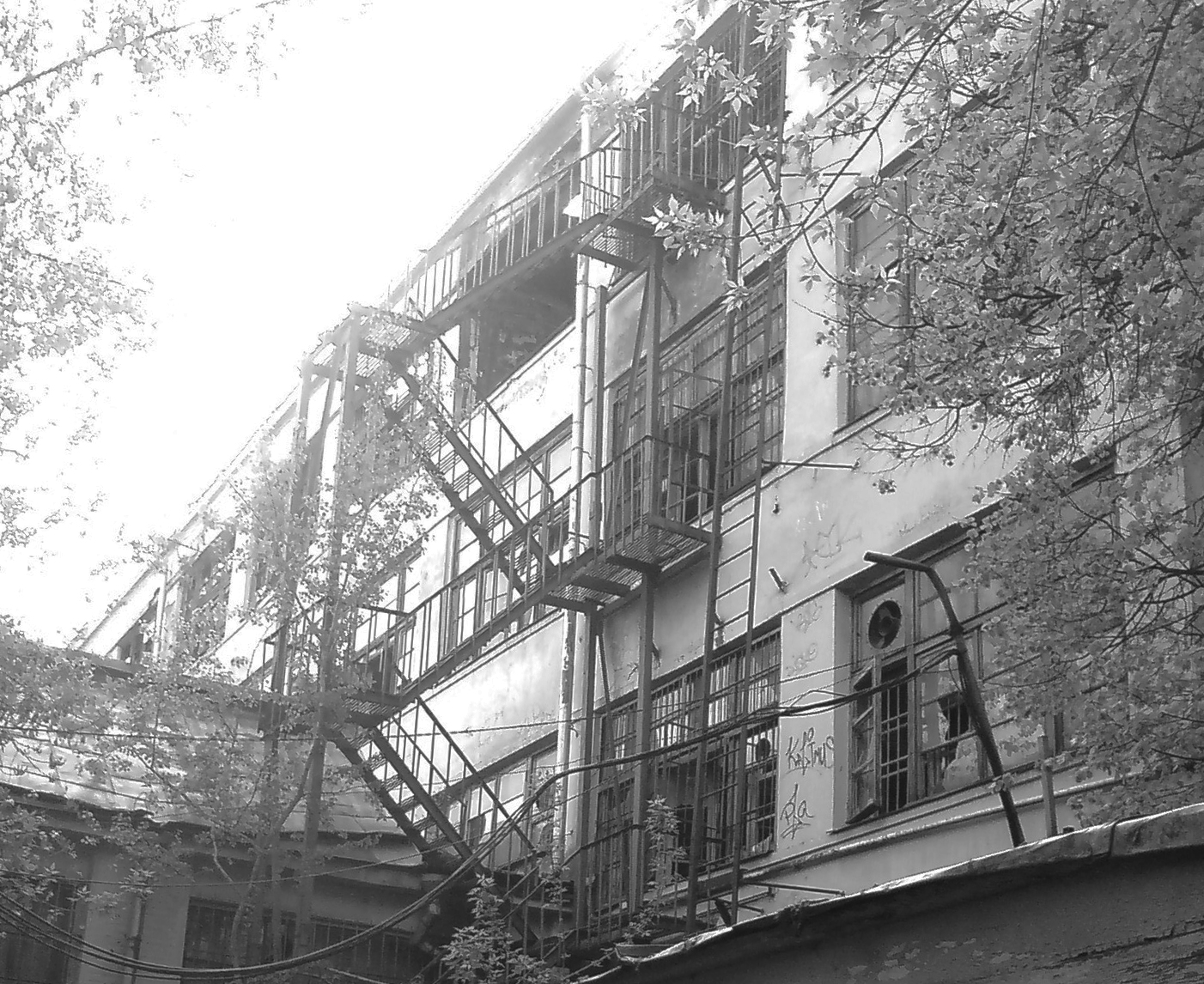
The building from a different angle

The printing plant of Ogonyok magazine in Moscow, designed by El Lissitzky, is likely the only extant building based on Lissitzky's blueprints. Located at 17, 1st Samotechny Lane, it is Lissitzky's only realized architectural work. Lissitzky was asked to design the printing house on 2 March 1930, and construction took place between 1931 and 1933. As his health worsened, the architect M. Barshch completed the project. Lissitzky's other architectural projects, including a textile plant, a yacht club, a communal apartment block and a publishing house for the newspaper Pravda, were never built. The Ogonyok plant was the only one to be realized.

The building served as Ogonyok magazine's printing plant until 1938, when it was taken over by Soviet security agencies. It remained in the hands of their successor organisations, including the NKVD, MGB, KGB and FSB, into the 1990s. By the early 2000s, the building had been abandoned.

The building was rediscovered by chance in 2007, when staff of the Russian Avant-Garde Fund found previously unknown blueprints for the plant in a Moscow archive while researching plans for a development on the neighbouring plot. In June 2007, the fund filed a request to list the building on the heritage register. It was included in the Register of Cultural Heritage of the City of Moscow on 26 July 2007. In September 2007, the city commission (Moskomnasledie) approved the request and passed it to the city government for final approval, which came on 21 August 2008.

By this time, the site was in conflict with a planned development on the adjacent plot. The project, known as the "Lumiere" residential complex for the Cinematographers' Union, was developed by Inteko and had received its own building permit in April 2008. On 12 October 2008, the same day a fence was erected around the Lumiere construction site, a fire broke out in three separate places on the printing plant's roof. Firefighters who arrived at the scene initially refused to enter the property, stating that it was closed territory belonging to the FSB. A television camera crew was called, and only after its arrival was the fire extinguished. By then, it had been burning for an additional hour. Without a roof, the building was further damaged by exposure to rain and snow over the following years. A temporary roof was not installed until spring 2013.

In 2009, an attempt was made to remove the building from the register of protected monuments. It was stopped following opposition from the architectural preservation community. Between 2009 and 2011, the building's official address changed several times. By 2012, protected status covered only part of the wider Ogonyok complex, which comprises several structures. One portion had by then been stripped of its original interior, while another retained only its facade.

In 2012, its status was upgraded to regional landmark. It was also announced that the building would be restored and become part of a hotel complex. Department of Culture officials described the building at the time as "a real masterpiece" that would be given "a second life" through restoration. Despite these plans, work carried out since then has involved extensive alteration rather than restoration. Windows, internal walls and roof structures were removed despite the building's protected status.
