= Georgy Krutikov =

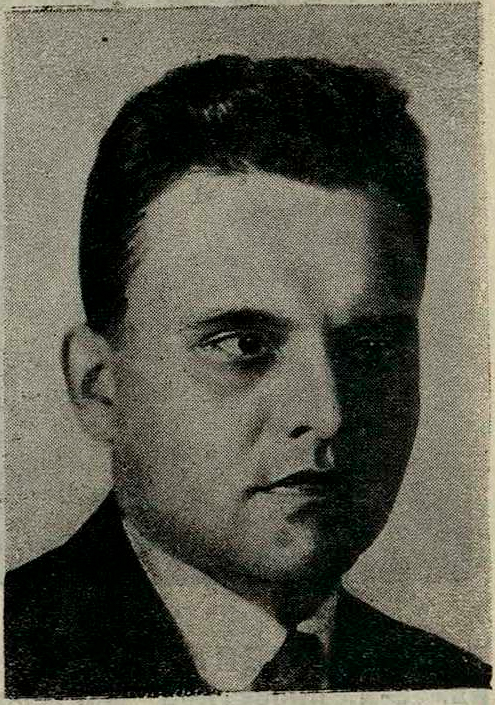
Georgy Krutikov

Georgy Tikhonovich Krutikov (1899–1958) was a Russian constructivist architect and artist, noted for his Flying City.

== Selected works ==
- 1928 – Flying city project
