= Nikolay Alexandrovich Milyutin =

Russian Bolshevik activist, architect and urban planning theorist

Nikolay Milyutin
- Николай Милютин
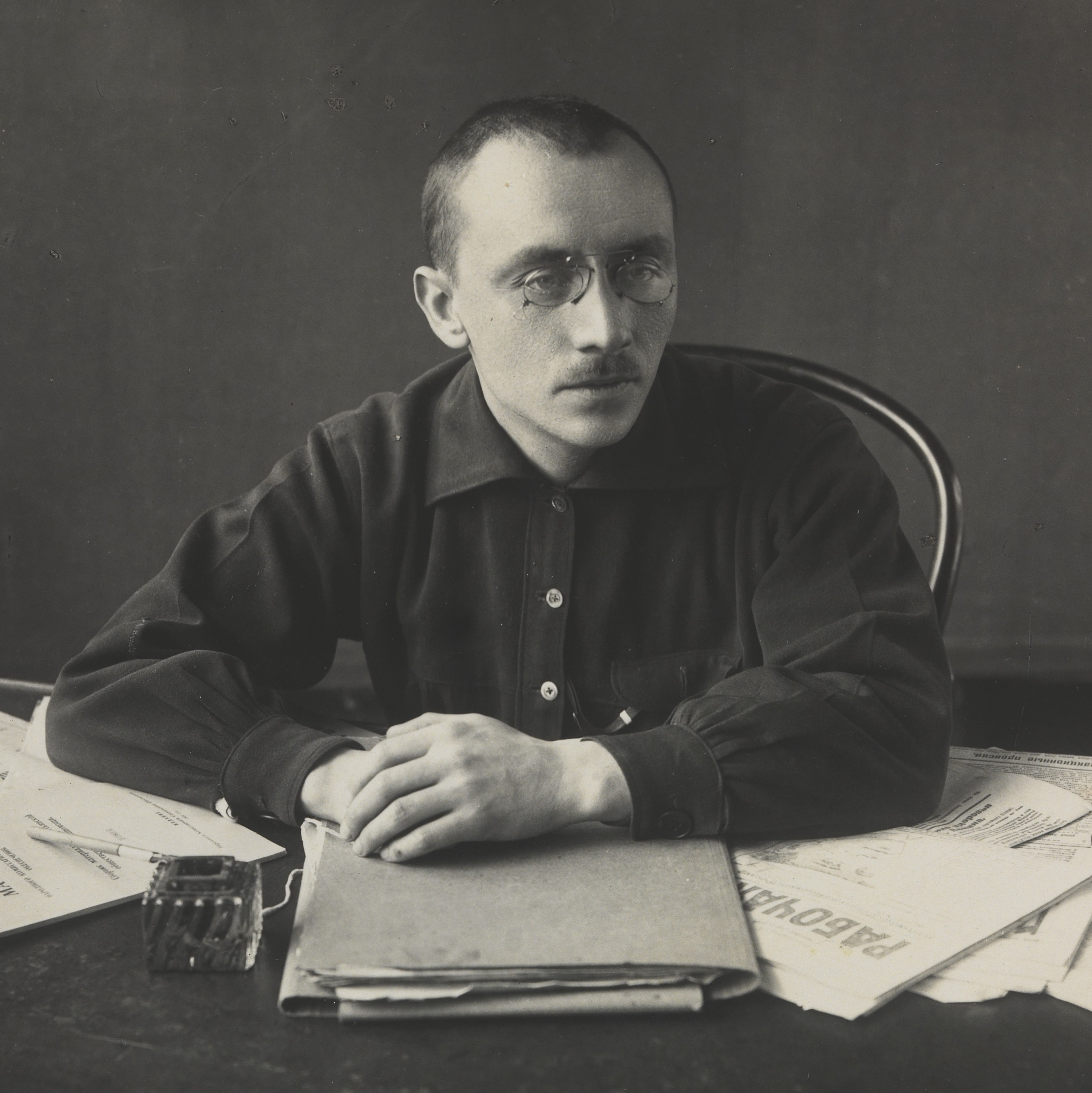
- Milyutin in 1922

People's Commissar for Finance of the RSFSR
- In office December 1924 – December 1929
- Premier: Alexei Rykov
- Preceded by: Miron Konstantinov
- Succeeded by: Varvara Yakovleva

Personal details
- Born: 21 December 1889 Saint Petersburg, Russian Empire
- Died: 4 October 1942 (aged 52) Moscow, Russian SFSR, Soviet Union
- Party: RSDLP (Bolsheviks) (1908–1918); All-Union Communist Party (bolsheviks) (1918–1942)
- Education: Moscow Architectural Institute
- Profession: Architect and urban planner

Nikolay Alexandrovich Milyutin, alternatively transliterated as Miliutin (Russian: Николай Александрович Милютин, 21 December [O.S. 8 December] 1889 – 4 October 1942) was a Russian trade union and Bolshevik activist, participant in the October Revolution in Petrograd and Soviet statesman and architect. After the revolution Milyutin held various executive appointments in Soviet Russia related to social security, urban and central planning and finance; reaching that of Commissar of Finance of the RSFSR in 1924–1929. Milyutin is, however, remembered as an urban planner and an amateur architect, author of Sotsgorod concept, and as the editor of Sovetskaya arkhitektura magazine in 1931–1934.

== Biography ==
Milyutin was born in Saint Petersburg; his grandfather was a port stevedore, his father a fisherman and fishmonger of noble origins who also attempted to return to farming and work in the port; after Nikolay's birth he was injured at work and lived the remainder of his life on a disability pension, then already in place in Russian Empire. Despite father's wishes, teenager Nikolay was not inclined to business, rather, he tried to get an education and at the same time was involved in politics. Around 1904 he made contacts with Russian Social Democratic Labour Party; he took part in the Bloody Sunday rally of 22 January [O.S. 9 January] 1905 and later in the storming of police departments to free up political detainees.

Milyutin looked for a training in architecture but lacked the secondary education required by established state colleges. Independent "free" colleges established after the 1905 Russian Revolution eased access to education; in 1908–1909 Milyutin studied the Free Polytechnicum (Вольный Политехникум) and in 1910–1914 at the Baron Schtiglitz School of Arts (class of easel painting). Through all these years Milyutin held a variety of jobs to make a living; he formally joined the Bolshevik faction of the Russian Social Democratic Labour Party in 1908 and remained an active Bolshevik agent. Since 1912 Milyutin also worked at the Trade Union of Office Workers (Союз конторщиков), having a seat on its board since 1913 and managing the largest disability insurance fund in Russia, that of Putilov Works, since 1914.

After the beginning of World War I the government shut down the unions and crushed Bolshevik local cells; Milyutin was illegally engaged in restoring the network. In 1915 he was drafted into the army but never saw active combat service, always stationed near Saint Peterburg and engaged in Bolshevik operations. He led his company against the tsar's government in the February Revolution and against the Provisional Government in July 1917; for the latter he was court-martialled to death by firing squad but was saved by another soldiers' mutiny. Milyutin made personal contact with Vladimir Lenin on the day of his return from emigration in April 1917. Later he and his company held defences against Kornilov threat and stormed the Winter Palace on the night of October Revolution. According to Milyutin's own writing, on this night his detachments launched a frontal assault from the Arch of General Staff onto the barricades set by the loyalists around the Alexander Column, and was the first to cross this line.

At the beginning of 1918 Milyutin volunteered into Red Guards but the Petrograd Soviet called him back to civilian duties. Since then and until 1941 he held a variety of appointments in regional and national economic agencies: deputy Commissar of Social Security in 1921–1924, Commissar of Finances of the RSFSR in 1924–1929, chairman of the Lesser Sovnarkom in 1929–1930, deputy chairman of Tsentrosoyuz in 1930–1931, deputy Commissar of Education of the RSFSR in 1931–1933. Milyutin, as the Commissar of Finance, was the client and sponsor of the Narkomfin Building by Moisei Ginzburg and Ignaty Milinis.

Since 1928 Milyutin also chaired the Commission on New town Planning and collaborated with theoreticians Moisei Ginzburg and Mikhail Okhitovich on the planned housing and development policies. Since 1930 he chaired the Housing Commission within the Communist Academy and edited Sovetskaya Arkhitektura magazine, the only professional magazine left after dissolution of SA magazine. Unlike the latter, which was the voice of OSA Group, Milytin's magazine provided space for rival groups (VOPRA, ASNOVA) at the same time being in opposition to outright revivalism and eclecticism. In 1933 Sovremennaya Arkhitektura briefly coexisted with the official Arkhitektura SSSR edited by Karo Alabyan; it was closed in 1934 after 19 issues, clearing the road to the monopoly of Stalinist architecture.

In the second half of 1930s Milyutin gradually stepped aside from executive duties; he continued writing his General Theory of Architecture and lectured at the Academy of Arts in Leningrad. His last significant appointment was that of artistic director on the construction site of the Palace of Soviets in Moscow, in 1939. In 1940 he finally obtained an architect's diploma at the Moscow Architectural Institute but declining health precluded him from further contributions. Milyutin was confined to bed by summer of 1941. After the start of the Second World War, he was evacuated to Sverdlovsk as part of the Construction Department of the Palace of Civil Engineering. In May 1942, Milyutin was allowed to defend his Ph.D. thesis on the topic “The Marxist Theory of Socialist Settlement” without exams. He died in Moscow in October 1942.

There is evidence that his last years were, indeed, plagued by fear of repression and that his retreat into lesser and lesser jobs was sort of a voluntary retirement from the dangers of public exposure.

== Innovations ==
=== Linear city ===
Milyutin's concept of city development outlined in his 1930 book, Sotsgorod (Socialist City), was superficially similar to an earlier de-urbanist concept of a linear city put forward by Mikhail Okhitovich. Unlike Okhitovich, whose linear city was terminated with industrial hubs and thus limited in growth, Milyutin's concept allowed for practically unrestricted linear growth. Milyutin as an economist was very well aware of construction costs and shortage of funds in the period of rapid industrialisation, and carefully weighed costs and benefits of available growth scenarios. His concept was based on decentralisation of industry, which needed to be spread in a thin line along a mainline railroad route, ideally - according to the natural flow of production from raw supplies to finished goods (Milyutin concentrated on gigantic mass production plants like the GAZ or the STZ). The housing zone, separated from the industrial zone by a park strip, would develop concurrently, and ideally residents will be settled directly across their employers, eliminating the need for private or public transportation. In another departure from linear city, he did not insist on building housing in a continuous strip; on the contrary, Milyutin proposed a less expensive model of initially isolated housing hubs spread along the main line which might, eventually, merge into a continuous housing belt.

=== Low-cost construction ===
Milyutin proposed various floorplans for low-cost communal housing and patented a low-cost girderless ceiling structure; one of his proposals, published in 1932, materialized in practice. The building themselves were working class barracks of a "transitional type" – high density cells (up 11 square meters single room, up to 18 square meters double) without the amenities of traditional urban apartments, but not as radical as true communal houses. Each building consisted of two blocks, set back against each other and merging at a common staircase. The staircase and adjacent shower rooms were built in brick, everything else relied on frame timbers. Windows, in line with the cliche of constructivist architecture, were arranged in continuous strips running most of the building's length; Milyutin also proposed completely glazed facades but these were too costly at the time. A campus of Milyutin's barracks was built in Moscow; his original flat roofs were replaced with traditional sloped ones. All these cheap and unsafe buildings have been demolished.

== Sources ==
- Andrusz, Gregory (1984). Housing and urban development in the USSR. SUNY Press. ISBN 978-0-87395-911-7.
- Bocharov, Yury; Khan-Magomedov, Selim (2007). Nikolay Milyutin (in Russian). Fond Russky Avangard / Arkhiterkura-S. ISBN 978-5-9647-0131-6.
- Buchli, Victor (2000). An archaeology of socialism. Berg Publishers. ISBN 978-1-85973-426-1.
- Goodman, David; Chant, Colin (1999). European cities & technology: industrial to post-industrial city. Routledge. ISBN 978-0-415-20079-0.
- Moughtin, Kate; Signoretta, Paola (2009). Urban Design: Health and the Therapeutic Environment. Architectural Press. ISBN 978-1-85617-614-9. p. 187
