= Soviet urban planning ideologies of the 1920s =

During the 1920s, Soviet urban planning ideologies established along two competing lines: the urbanist and disurbanist schools. Whilst the proposed form of the city differed between the two ideologies, their visions of social organization for communal living overlapped.

== Background ==
In the decades before the formation of the Soviet Union, Tsarist Russia had experienced a rapid period of industrialisation and urbanisation, tripling in size between 1850 and 1914. At the 1917 October Revolution, the new State inherited overcrowded cities characterized by poor sanitation and disease, and class divide.

The 1917 revolution brought Marxist attitudes that rural life was backward and resulted in inequality. Such ideals required the distinction between rural and urban be abolished so as to raise the population to a common standard of living. All land was nationalized and socialized, and on 20 August 1918 all urban property was transferred by decree to the State or local authorities. Houses and apartments once belonging to the bourgeoisie were subdivided to provide accommodation for the proletariat, providing some initial relief to overcrowding.

The collapse of the old spatial order required that new planning approaches to the city be created. Whilst the economic and labour demands of World War I and the ongoing Civil War meant that the implementation of physical urban outcomes were prevented, a debate as to the desired form the socialist city was initiated. The debate continued throughout the 1920s, with two broad opposing schools of thought emerging: the urbanists, and the disurbanists.

== Urbanist school ==
The urbanist school was led by Leonid Sabsovich, and included significant architects of the time including the brothers Viktor, Leonid and Alexander Vesnin, and the brothers Panteleymon and Ilya Golosov. They opposed the expansion of existing cities and instead advocated for a partial decentralisation to a system of self-contained, compact centres located around industry, of a fixed population of approximately 50,000 people.

These new cities would embody strict land-use zoning, development of both housing and industry, walkable journeys to work, green spaces and leisure facilities, and a non-commercial centre. Both Bater and French acknowledge the influence of the Garden city movement on the concept, though the degree is debated.

Such a city would break down distinctions between the agriculturalist and proletarian, and dissolve the nuclear family to create a completely communal way of life. Key to the concept was the creation of communal houses, each accommodating two to three thousand people in separate sleeping units – ‘cells’ of 5 to 6 square metres each. All other activities, including kitchens, eating halls, crèches and kindergartens, would be accommodated in communal facilities attached to or nearby the communal house. An extreme example was Ivan Kuznin’s proposal in which the day for each age group would be ordered with precisely regulated timing for each action, such as waking up, washing, dressing, walking to dining hall.

Design competitions for communal houses include Kharkiv in 1924-5, Moscow in 1925-6 and Leningrad in 1930.

== Disurbanist school ==
The disurbanist school was led by the theorists M. Okhitovich and M. Ginsburg. In contrast to the urbanists, the disurbanists saw the achievement of the Marxist goal of the dissolution of the difference between town and country as the total abolition of the traditional concept of the town. They proposed that settlement be dispersed across the whole of the Soviet Union in the form of continuous ribbon developments. Individual dwellings would be distributed along roads in natural and rural surroundings, but within easy reach of communal dining and recreation amenities. Employment centres would be located at road junctions, with bus services transporting workers from their houses. Whilst individual living space would be private, the disurbanists proposed a communal lifestyle similar to that proposed by the urbanists.

Proposals put forward by the disurbanists included Okhitovich’s 1930 plan for Magnitogorsk which consisted of eight 25km long ribbons converging on a metallurgical plant. Ginsberg imagined that Moscow’s population be emptied and resettled in long linear zones of communal houses through forests, serviced by bus stations and zones of recreation and service amenities at regular intervals.

Soviet disurbanism later inspired Chinese efforts in developing satellite towns around major industrial centers.

== Abandonment ==
While many proposals were put forward by both the urbanists and disurbanists schools of thought, very few were actually implemented. French argues that the theoreticians failed to understand the social working of groups. The majority of the working class rejected the idea of the collective dwelling and Stalin being a political realist saw the proposals as too utopian - dangerous experiments that could be economically crippling. The planning ideas of the urbanists and disurbanists were subsequently abandoned with the State reverting to classicism.

== See also ==
- Urban planning in communist countries
- Sotsgorod: Cities for Utopia
