= Ilya Golosov =

Russian Constructivist architect (1883–1945)

Ilya Alexandrovich Golosov
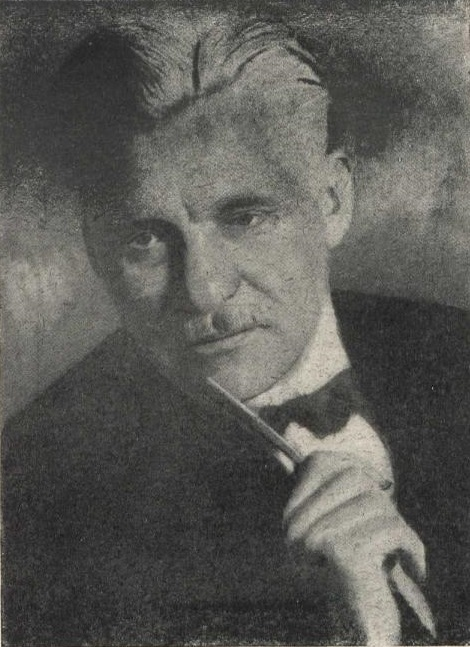
- Born: July 31, 1883; Moscow
- Died: January 29, 1945 (aged 61); Moscow
- Occupation: Architect
- Practice: Mossovet Architectural Workshop No.4 (since 1933)
- Buildings: Zuev Workers' Club, Yauzsky Boulevard apartment building (Moscow), Communal housing (Ivanovo)
- Projects: Entries to 1926 competitions (Rusgertorg, Electrobank etc.)

Ilya Alexandrovich Golosov (Russian: Илья Александрович Голосов; 31 July 1883 – 21 January 1945) was an architect from the late Russian Empire and early Soviet Union. A leader of Constructivism in 1925-1931, Ilya Golosov later developed his own style of early stalinist architecture known as postconstructivism. Не was a brother of Panteleimon Golosov.

== Career ==
=== Education, World War I, Revolution ===
Golosov studied in the Stroganov School of Arts and Moscow School of Painting, Sculpture and Architecture, graduating in 1912. Before World War I, he trained in the workshops of Igor Grabar and Alexey Shchusev, and collaborated with Marian Peretyatkovich and Ivan Rerberg on Northern Insurance Buildings (Moscow). In 1914-1917 Golosov served as a military engineer. In 1918, Golosov joined Moscow state architectural office led by neoclassicist Ivan Zholtovsky, and stayed with him throughout the Civil war, at the same time teaching at the MVTU and VKhUTEMAS.

=== Developing style (1918-1925) ===
Golosov's work during the Civil War and first years of New Economic Policy was limited to city planning projects, landscaping and repairs. A decade of hostilities (1914–1922) caused an unexpected outcome for the profession and Golosov brothers personally: their first chance to build anything emerged when they were already 40 years old. The "new generation" were, in fact, mature men with classic prerevolutionary training; the next generation (Ivan Leonidov and the class of 1929) was just beginning their college training.

Ilya Golosov participated in numerous architectural contests of the twenties, starting with the 1922-1923 House of Labor contest. Golosov developed a personal design style, when the building had to have a center of mass, a dominant shape; all smaller shapes and details are subordinate to the dominant and should follow a decreasing rhythm, like a ripple on water surface. Golosov himself defined this style as symbolic romanticism, well before joining the constructivist camp.

=== Constructivism (1925-1932) ===
In 1924, Golosov was profoundly impressed by Vesnin brothers designs of Arkos and Leningrad Pravda. Unlike his brother Panteleimon, he had not joined the constructivist movement, the OSA Group at its inception in December, 1925. Golosov's designs of this period feature carefully thought-out exterior glass walls, emphasizing inner structure of the dominant shape. Apart from numerous contest entries, Golosov won many practical commissions. Like the Vesnin brothers, he had a formal pre-revolutionary education and engineering experience, helping him win the real jobs. Unlike theorists like Moisei Ginzburg or Ivan Leonidov, Golosov was busy with actually managing construction sites, and abstained from theoretical the debates of 1925-1929.

As Selim Khan-Magomedov pointed out, "He created the finest examples of constructivism, yet never became a devoted constructivist. He understood that constructivist theories contradict his own architectonic concepts of early 20s... Golosov accepted constructivism as an exterior decoration trend, not as a wholesome functional style". Yet, for a brief period in 1925-1928, fellow architects perceived him as the leader of constructivism, due to his highly publicized completed designs like the 1927-1929 Zuev Workers' Club (see also: interior photograph) and a brilliant streak of contest entries in 1926.

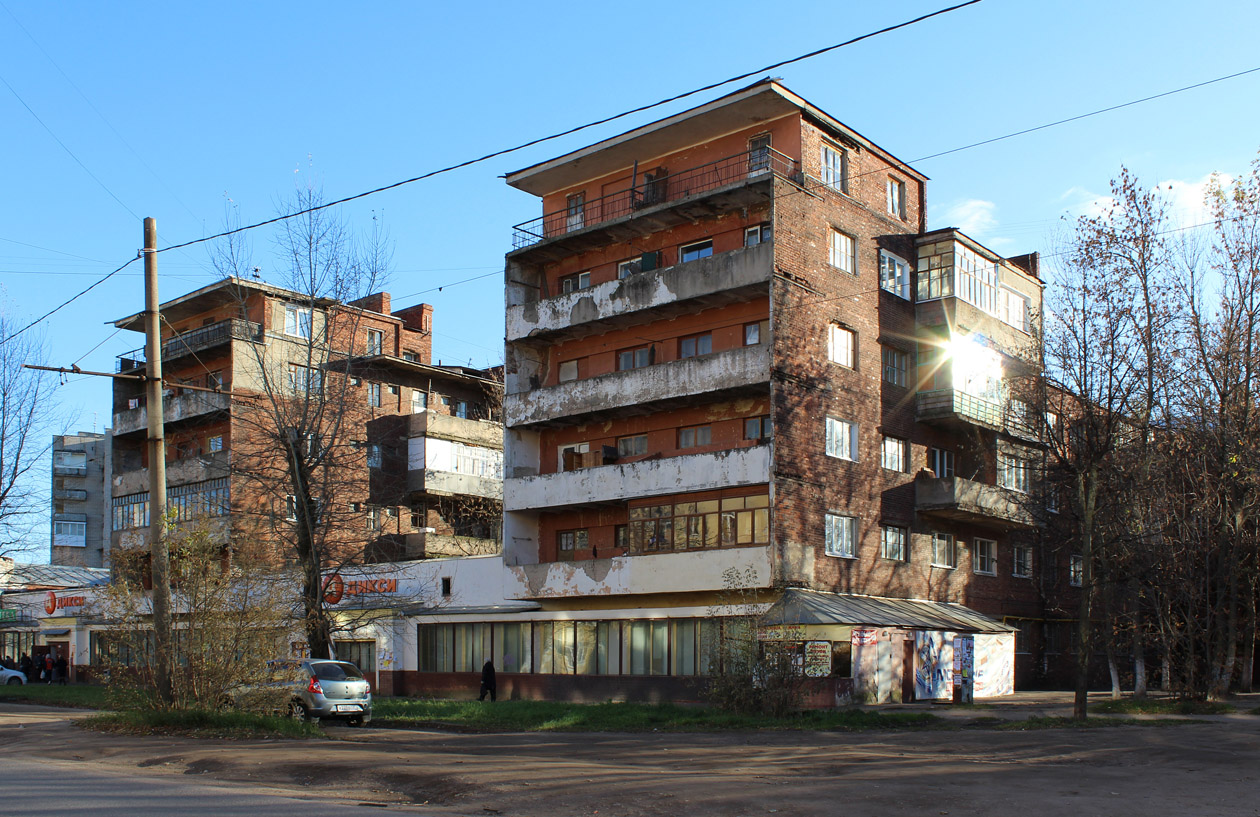
Collective House, 1930-1931

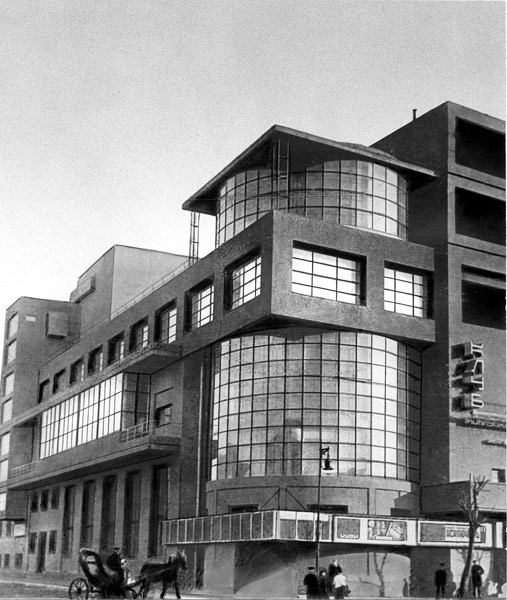
Zuev Workers' Club, 1927-1929

=== Postconstructivism (1932-1941) ===
In 1932, when the state sent a message to abandon avant-garde in favor of neoclassical architecture, Golosov responded with a neoclassical adaptation of his symbolic romanticism concept. Golosov and his followers deliberately replaced the proven historical details (columns, capitals, friezes and cornices) with their own inventions - to differentiate themselves from pure Revivalists like Zholtovsky. The most common feature was a square, lean column with a simplified rectangular capital and base. For a short period, 1932–1936, this new style, postconstructivism (a term coined by Selim Khan-Magomedov), became the most common in Soviet Russia.

Ilya Golosov, assigned to lead a Mossovet architectural workshop, perfected his style in numerous contests of 1932-1938. Unlike Konstantin Melnikov, who lost his job in 1936, Golosov was employed in practical construction until 1941 with typical postconstructivist building like the Teplobeton apartments on Spiridonovka Street (1933–34) and Yauzsky Boulevard apartments (1936–1941). In 1938, he designed and managed construction of a typical Stalinist apartment block in Nizhny Novgorod (Oktyabrskaya Street), which earned an honorable posthumous mention in "XXX years of Soviet architecture" edition in 1949.

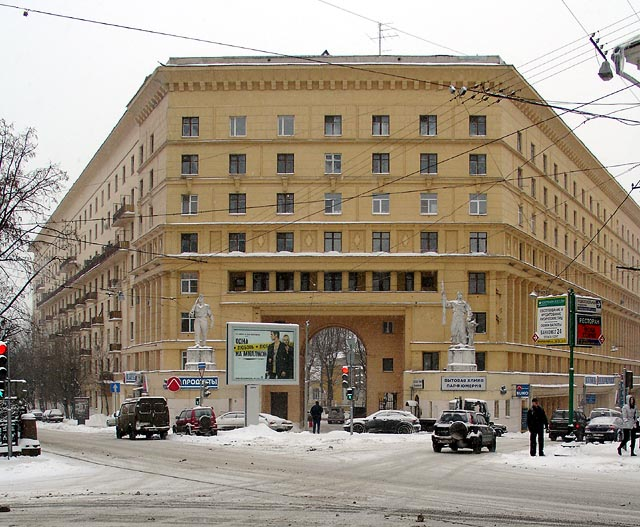
Ilya Golosov. Yauzsky Boulevard, 2, 1936-1941

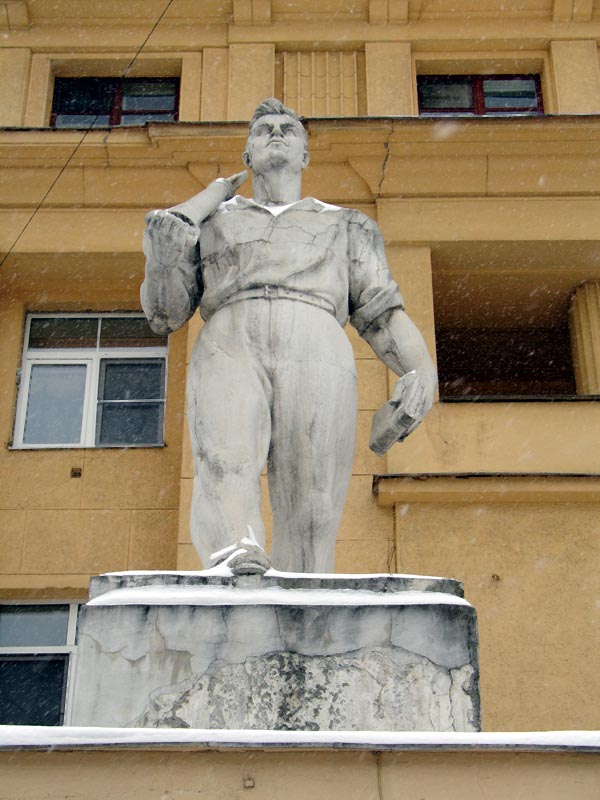
Ilya Golosov. Yauzsky Boulevard, 2, fragment

=== Death and legacy ===
Ilya Golosov continued teaching architecture throughout World War II. Like his brother Panteleimon, Ilya died in 1945 in Moscow and was interred at Novodevichye cemetery.

== Buildings ==
=== Completed buildings ===
- 1912 - junior architect on Northern Insurance Buildings, Moscow (lead architects Marian Peretyatkovich, Ivan Rerberg)
- 1923 - Far Eastern Pavilion at the All-Russian Agricultural Exhibition, Moscow (demolished, Concept drawing Chinese gates)
- 1927-1929 - Zuev Workers' Club, Moscow
- 1931 - Collective House (400-unit apartment building), Ivanovo (photograph)
- 1932 - Teplobeton apartment building, Spriridonovka Street, Moscow (Photographs, before construction and present day)
- 1936 - Apartment building, Yauzsky Boulevard, Moscow
- 1938 - Trade Union College, Moscow
- 1938 - Oktyabrskaya Street apartment block, Nizhny Novgorod

=== Competition entries, unrealized drafts ===
- 1923 - Palace of Labour, Moscow (Design concept).
- 1924 - USSR pavilion at the Exposition Internationale des Arts Décoratifs et Industriels Modernes (Concept drawing 1 Concept drawing 2)
- 1924 - Lenin House of the People, Ivanovo (awarded to Grigory Barkhin. Photograph, present day)
- 1925 - House of Labor, Rostov-on-Don
- 1925 - Textile Building, Moscow
- 1926 - Smolensky Market, Moscow
- 1926 - Central Telegraph building, Moscow (awarded to Ivan Rerberg. Photograph, as built)
- 1926 - Electrobank building, Moscow (Concept drawing)
- 1926 - Rusgertorg building, Moscow (Concept drawing)
- 1928 - Communal housing, Stalingrad
- 1928 - Dynamo building, Moscow (awarded to Ivan Fomin. Photograph, as built)
- 1928 - Azneft oil pump building, Baku (Concept drawing)
- 1928 - Textile mill, Vyazniki
- 1930 - Oblpotrebsoyuz (Regional Cooperative) building, Ivanovo
- 1932 - Palace of the Soviets, Moscow (awarded to Boris Iofan)
- 1932 - House of Books (Ogiz publishing building), Moscow

== See also ==
- OSA Group
