= OSA Group =

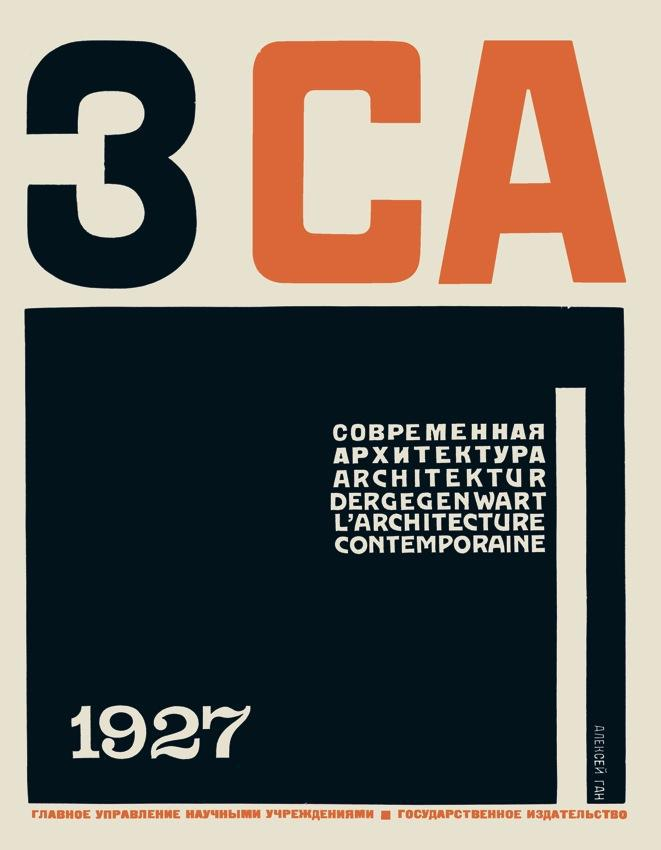
Cover of SA, 1927, designed by Aleksei Gan

The OSA Group (Organization of Contemporary Architects) was an architectural association in the Soviet Union, which was active from 1925 to 1930 and considered the first group of constructivist architects. It published the journal SA (Russian: Современная Архитектура, romanized: Sovremmennaia Arkhitektura, lit. 'Modern Architecture'). It published material by Soviet and overseas contributors. However this led to them being attacked as a 'Western' group and some individuals as being 'bourgeois'. After the closure of the group, their modernist approach to architecture and town planning was eliminated in the Soviet Union by 1934, in favour of socialist realism.

== Contemporary architecture ==
Like the ASNOVA group, OSA grew out of the avant-garde wing of the VKhUTEMAS school in Moscow. The group's founders were Moisei Ginzburg, well known for his book Style and Epoch (a Soviet response to Le Corbusier's Vers une Architecture) and the painter, designer and architect Alexander Vesnin. Unlike the earlier association the OSA group claimed for itself the name Constructivist, in that it was, in its utilitarianism and concentration on function rather than form, an architectural equivalent to the experiments of 'artistic' Constructivism. OSA was in many ways the architectural wing of the socialist Modernists of LEF, and likewise set up its own journal in 1926.

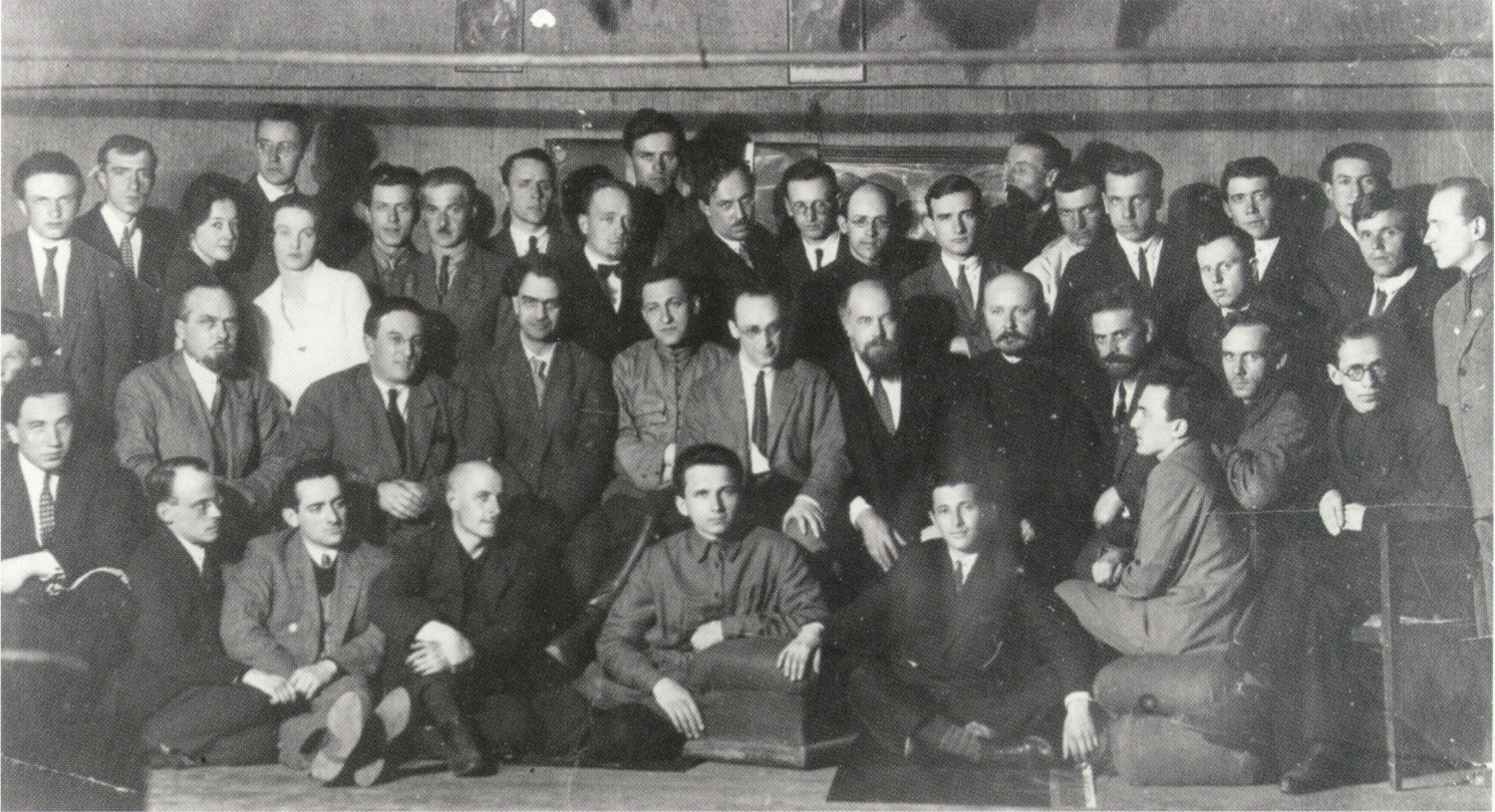
First OSA Conference, 1928

Until its closure in 1930, SA would publish articles on a variety of subjects, including a symposium on flat roofs, a special issue on colour in architecture, and discussions of Le Corbusier, the Bauhaus, Fernand Léger, and Kasimir Malevich (who was also a contributor to the journal). The design was mainly by Aleksei Gan, who also designed the distinctive grid pattern of the covers. Photography was occasionally by Alexander Rodchenko. As well as publishing on the built projects of Modernism, the journal published experimental projects by VKhUTEMAS students such as Lydia Komarova's Comintern project, the strange pod houses of Sokolov, and the works of Ivan Leonidov. Articles in the journal was mainly in Russian, though occasionally parts of it were in German, highlighting the group's affinities with the Neues Bauen, although no OSA architects were invited to contribute to the Weissenhof Estate. The group was, however, the Soviet counterpart of Der Ring in Germany: agitating for Modern architecture and construction methods, and polemicising against the Classicism and Eclecticism that would eventually coalesce into Stalinist architecture.

== OSA activities ==
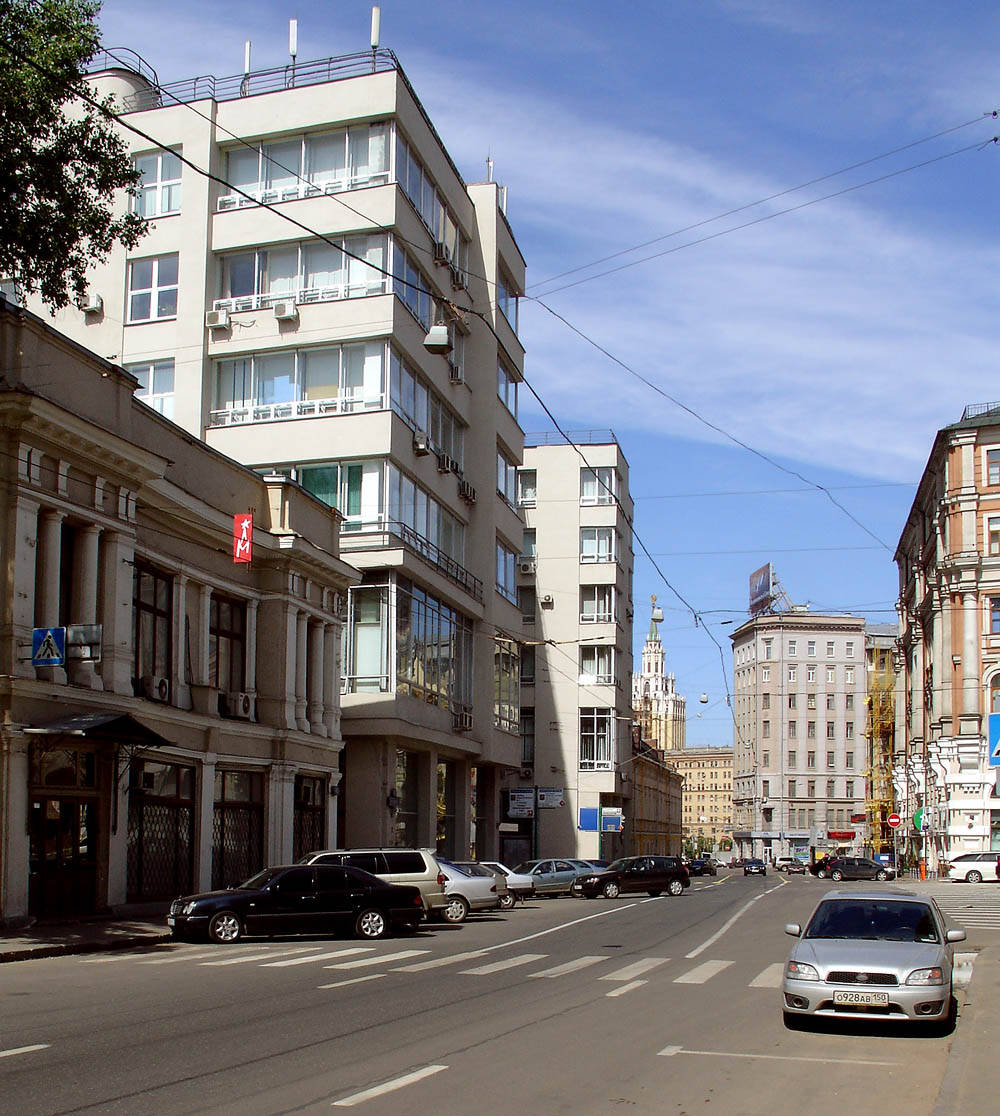
Boris Velikovsky with Barsch, Gaken et al., Gostorg Building, 1926.

There are several examples of built works designed by OSA members in the USSR. These include Moisei Ginzburg's apartment blocks (on Gogolsky Boulevard, Moscow, another in Sverdlovsk, and most famously the Gostrakh and Narkomfin buildings); the 1920s-'30s work of the Vesnin brothers such as the Likhachev Palace of Culture and the Mostorg department store in Moscow, and the Ivanovo bank and DneproGES power station; works by Mikhail Barsch, such as Moscow Planetarium (with Sinyakvsky) and the Gostorg office block (as part of a team headed by Boris Velikovsky); works by Ivan Nikolaev, such as the electrical-technical complex in Moscow (with Fissenko; this work was featured in MOMA's 1932 International Style exhibition) and the large collective house for the students in Moscow; and the workers' housing designed by Alexander Nikolsky in Tractor Street, Leningrad.

The OSA group's leading theorists were members of the CIAM from 1928 until 1933, with Ginzburg and Nikolai Kolli members of its secretariat, CIRPAC. A small CIAM meeting with the OSA group was held in Moscow in 1932, with Sigfried Giedion and Cornelius van Eesteren in attendance. Sergei Eisenstein's The General Line featured specially built buildings by OSA's Andrey Burov. The utopian projects of Ivan Leonidov were first published in SA, and their technologically advanced, fantastic nature led to harsh criticisms from the VOPRA group of Arkady Mordvinov and Karo Alabian, coining the phrase 'Leonidovism' to attack this 'Western' group: in a 1929 editorial SA trenchantly defended Leonidov, but this was a sign of what was to come, with Mikhail Barsch being targeted in an 'anti-bourgeois' campaign at VKhUTEMAS/VKhUTEIN.

== From collective houses to disurbanism ==
OSA took an avant-garde position with respect to urban planning as well as architecture, one that sometimes differed from the position of the Communist Party. In 1926-29 they were active in propagandising collective houses and pioneered the notion of the social condenser. OSA architects were employed by the state to develop a standard for apartment buildings (the Stroikom apartments) for the purposes of mass production. However, by 1929 there was a shift in the group's theory away from collective city blocks to 'disurbanism', perhaps influenced by the brutalities of forced collectivisation in the Soviet countryside. Mikhail Okhitovich's theories of using telecommunications, roads and infrastructure to create diffuse, semi-rural cities were published in SA, and the group's proposals for the new town of Magnitogorsk were produced with his input, only to be defeated by Ernst May of Der Ring. The 1930 debate over 'disurbanism' saw the OSA leadership (particularly Ginzburg) throw itself behind the theory, which had dire consequences when the movement was condemned by a Politburo statement. The journal was wound up in 1930, and OSA briefly became SASS (Section of Architects for Socialist Construction) before being merged into the state architecture union. The group's members continued to practice in a Modernist fashion until 1934 and the official ushering in of Socialist Realism. Most OSA members survived the great purge, with the exceptions of Alexei Gan and Mikhail Okhitovich, who were both murdered.

With the general rehabilitation of Modernism in the 1960s the issues of SA were reprinted, after decades of suppression.

== Some OSA Members and other contributors to SA ==
- Alexander Vesnin
- Moisei Ginzburg
- Mikhail Barsch
- Andrey Burov
- Aleksei Gan
- Ilya Golosov
- Panteleimon Golosov
- Nikolai Kolli
- Lydia Komarova
- Le Corbusier
- Ivan Leonidov
- Kasimir Malevich
- Nikolai Krasilnikov
- Ivan Nikolaev
- Alexander Nikolsky
- Mikhail Okhitovich
- Alexander Pasternak
- Alexander Rodchenko
- Varvara Stepanova

== See also ==
- Soviet urban planning ideologies of the 1920s

== References and sources ==
Sources

- Catherine Cooke, Russian Avant-Garde - Theories of Architecture, Urbanism and the City (Academy Editions, 1995) ISBN 1-85490-390-X
- Hugh D Hudson, Blueprints and Blood
- Selim Khan-Magomedov, Pioneers of Soviet Architecture
- Anatole Kopp, Town and Revolution
- Eric Mumford, The CIAM discourse on Urbanism
- Frederick Starr, 'Visionary Town Planning' in Cultural Revolution in Russia 1928-31 (ed Sheila Fitzpatrick)
