= Arkady Mordvinov =

Soviet architect

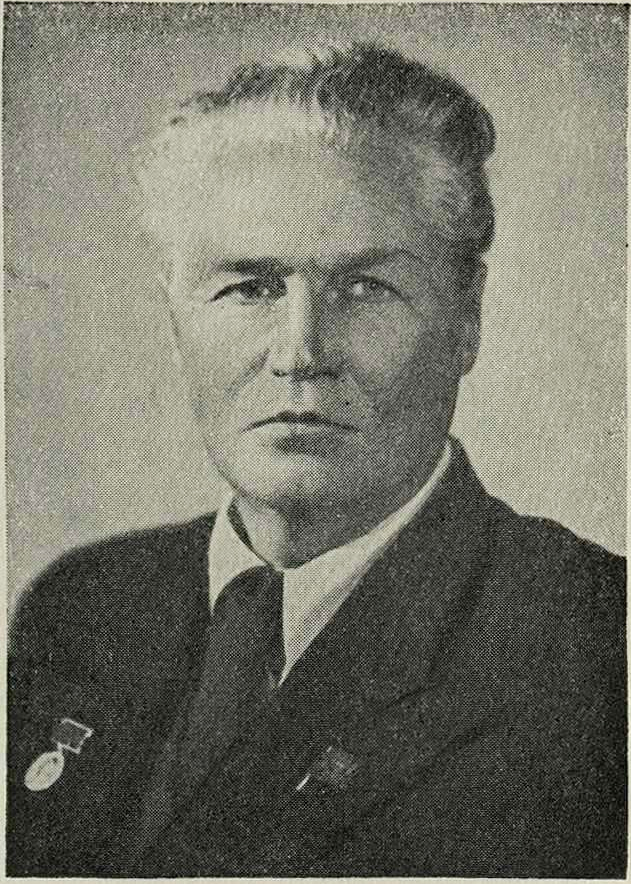
- A. G. Mordvinov in 1949
- Born: Arkady Mordvishev; 27 January 1896; Zhuravlikha, Nizhny Novgorod Governorate, Russian Empire
- Died: 23 July 1964 (aged 68); Moscow, Russian SFSR, Soviet Union
- Resting place: Novodevichy Cemetery, Moscow
- Education: Bauman Moscow State Technical University
- Occupation: Architect

Arkady Grigoryevich Mordvinov (Russian: Арка́дий Григо́рьевич Мордви́нов; born Mordvishev (Мордвишев), January 27, 1896 – July 23, 1964) was a Soviet architect and construction manager, notable for Stalinist architecture of Tverskaya Street, Leninsky Avenue, Hotel Ukraina skyscraper in Moscow and his administrative role in Soviet construction industry and architecture.

== Biography ==
=== VOPRA years ===
Mordvinov was born in the village of Zhuravlikha in the Nizhny Novgorod Governorate of the Russian Empire. Mordvinov's early work, prior to his graduation from Moscow State Technical University (MVTU) in 1930, is definitely Constructivist, best seen in his Kharkiv Post Office of the late 1920s.

In 1929-1932, Mordvinov, Karo Halabyan and Alexander Vlasov were the founding members of VOPRA, a group of young 'Proletarian Architects' who attacked proponents of the Constructivist movement, notably Ivan Leonidov, and all other "alien art" like eclectics, formalism and even baroque: "There is no class-free art, neither class-free architecture" ("Бесклассового искусства у нас нет и бесклассовой архитектуры тоже нет" - Khan-Magomedov cites Mordvinov's March, 1928 speech). Mordvinov was also a vocal opponent of Le Corbusier's Tsentrosoyuz building. VOPRA was used by the state against free-minded modernist architects and to consolidate the profession under tight state control. VOPRA founders had no clear creative concept beyond these rhetorics, and could not be criticised for their art, since it never existed. They definitely understood the likely consequences of their political assaults and had no remorse for their victims (the age of show trials already began with Shakhty Trial and Industrial Party Trial).

=== Executive career ===
Despite the bitter war between VOPRA and modernist groups (ASNOVA, the OSA Group) there was an attempt to unify the architects within one voluntary union (MOVANO). With support from older generation (Alexey Shchusev), MOVANO existed in 1930-1932, however, VOPRA tried to destroy it from within and launched their own magazine, RA (Revolutionary Architecture), co-edited by Mordvinov; soon, he co-edited another magazine, SA (Soviet Architecture, 1931-1934). Formation of Union of Soviet Architects in 1932 allowed Mordvinov to move from small-time criticism to an executive position; he acquired bureaucratic muscle and set up his own workshop, present in all architectural contests of the 1930s.

Mordvinov's 1930s version of Stalinist architecture - compared with old revivalists like Ivan Zholtovsky - was more rationalist, lacking classical order, a simplified development of Ivan Fomin's Red Doric style. This is a direct consequence of his lack of academic training. According to Khan-Magomedov, Mordvinov was influenced by the Stenberg brothers, the draftsmen who rendered his early works. In fact, during the 1930s Mordvinov gradually accepted the rules of eclectics whom he had publicly nailed in 1928, and wilfully encouraged the arrest of unrepentant Modernists such as Mikhail Okhitovich, who Mordvinov publicly denounced, implicating him in Okhitovich's eventual murder.

=== Moscow avenues ===
His political campaigning was rewarded with a 1947 commission to rebuild the right side of Tverskaya Street. Mordvinov's architectural input may be disputed, but he proved himself a capable project manager, successfully implementing so-called flow methode of moving construction crews between buildings in different construction stages. This was followed by equally grand Leninsky Prospekt (1939-1940), Bolshaya Polyanka (1940), Moskva River embankments (1940-1941) and Novinsky Boulevard (1939-1941) projects.

This work earned him Stalin Prize in 1941; incidentally, Mordvinov himself was on the Stalin Prize Board since its establishment in 1940. Since 1937, Mordvinov also enjoyed a management seat in the Union of Soviet Architects, has been President of Academy of Architecture (1950-1955) and International Union of Architects.

=== Post-war reconstruction ===
In 1943-1947, Mordvinov chaired the State Committee on Construction and Architecture, charged with rebuilding the damage of World War II. In particular, he supervised the first master plans of rebuilding Minsk and Smolensk.

His influence was reinforced by a 1947 commission to design one of the Moscow Skyscrapers, now known as the Hotel Ukraina, which he shared with Vyacheslav Oltarzhevsky, one of the few Soviet experts in highrise construction.

In 1955, Mordvinov received a public beating by Nikita Khrushchev for his expensive "architectural excesses", but even Khrushchev could not deny Mordvinov's management and planning skills. In 1956-1964, Mordvinov completed two major projects - redevelopment of Komsomolsky Prospekt and greenfield Cheryomushki District which became the symbol of Khrushchev's affordable housing initiative.

== See also ==
- Constructivist architecture
- Postconstructivism
