= Leonid Sabsovich =

Russian urban planner

Leonid M. Sabsovich (Russian: Леонид Моисеевич Сабсович) was an urban planner and economist, most famous for his 'Urbanist' proposals during the 1920s and 1930s in the Soviet Union (USSR), leading him to be considered the leading figure of Urbanist city planning movement in the Soviet Union. Sabsovich's Urbanist movement was directly opposed that of the 'Disurbanists' who were led by Mikhail Okhitovich also within the Soviet Union.

Sabsovich outlined an urbanist vision for the Soviet Union calling for all cities and villages to be replaced by towns containing approximately 25 to 50 residential units over a time period of ten years. These Urban housing units were intended to communally house 1400 to 2000 people each, while providing well developed communal facilities to facilitate the development of communist ideology. The only private living space was to be the rather small 'sleeping cabins'. The Urbanists envisioned cities as a 'social condenser' that was well equipped to instill people with communitarian attitudes and values that the new communist world required.

Sabsovich wrote in the Constructivists' Sovremennaya Arkhitektura (SA) Journal the following quote:

"Not for nothing, that when I presented in all its sharpness the questions of the organisation of new life to the most active women-workers of the town Novosibirsk, they unanimously gave their view, that the dimensions of the public space in no case can be reduced. They pointed out, that in new dwellings they first of all needed public spaces. A room for collective use is, they say as 'necessary as the breath of one's nostrils and as the food'."

== See also ==
- Mikhail Okhitovich
- Urban Planning
- Vladimir Tatlin
- Kasimir Malevich
- Lyubov Popova
- El Lissitzky
- Georgy Krutikov
- Yakov Chernikhov
- Suprematism
- Constructivism
