= Urban planning in communist states =

Urban planning in socialist countries
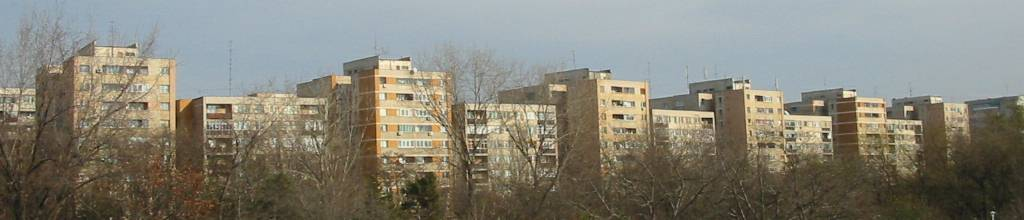
- The skyline of many cities became dominated by standardized apartment blocks, Bucharest

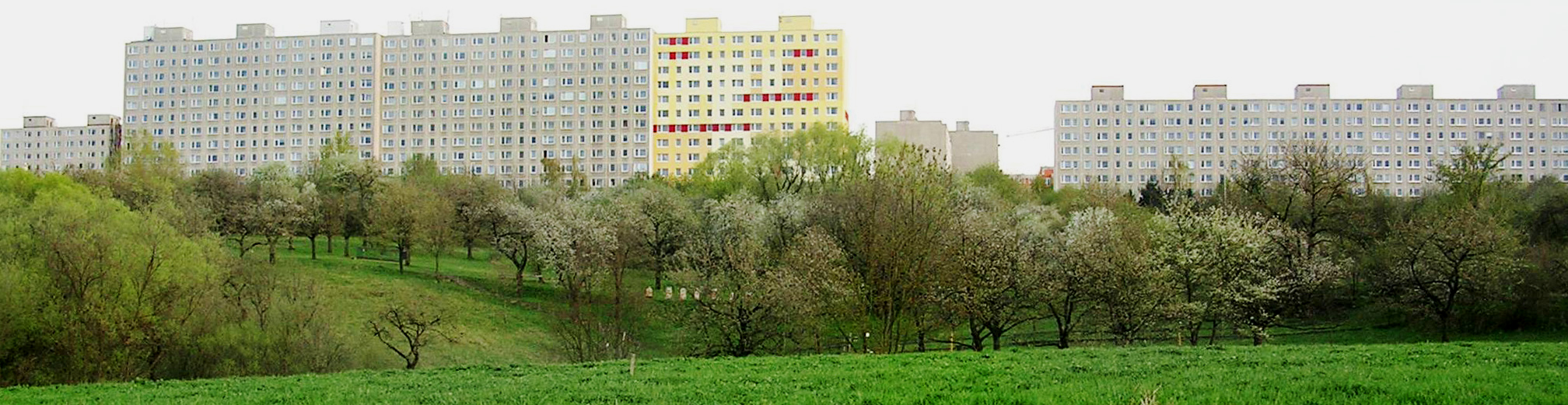
- Prague, the Košík housing estate.

Urban planning in the Soviet Bloc countries during the Cold War era was dictated by ideological, political, social as well as economic motives.

This thinking was reflected in the urban design of all communist countries. Most socialist systems exercised a form of centrally controlled development and simplified methods of construction already outlined in the Soviet guidelines at the end of the Stalinist period. The communist planning resulted in virtually identical city blocks being erected across many nations, even if there were differences in the specifics between each country.

These uniform apartment blocks, ubiquitous over communist countries, have become known as "commie blocks".

Soviet-style cities are often traced to Modernist ideas in architecture such as those of Le Corbusier and his plans for Paris. The housing developments often featured tower blocks, standardized and mass-produced using structural insulated panels within a short period of time.

== Beginnings of urban planning in communist countries ==
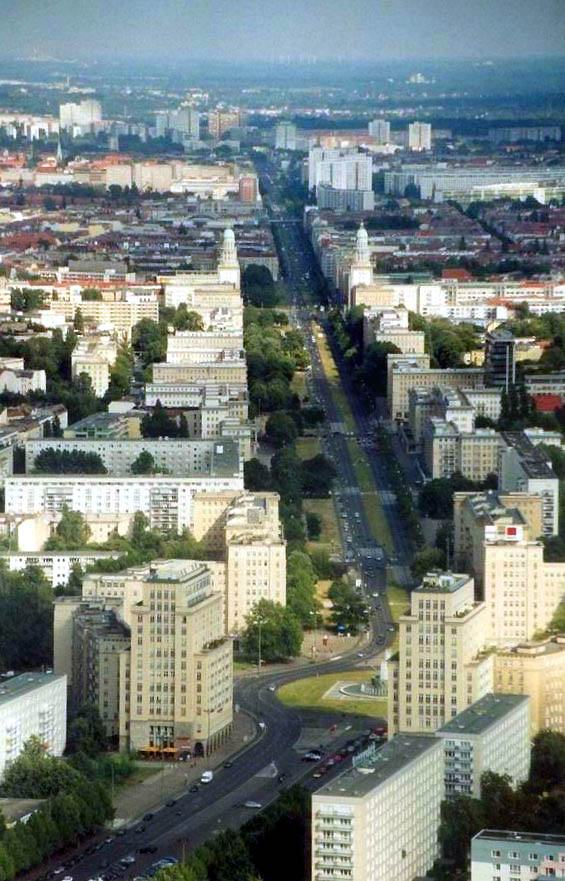
Karl-Marx-Allee in East Berlin, built between 1952 and 1960

Many eastern European countries had suffered physical damage during World War II and their economies were in a very poor state. There was a need to reconstruct cities which had been severely damaged due to the war. For example, Warsaw, Poland, had been practically razed to the ground under the planned destruction of Warsaw by German forces after the 1944 Warsaw Uprising. The centre of Dresden, Germany, had been totally destroyed by the 1945 Allied bombardment. Stalingrad had been largely destroyed and only a small number of structures were left standing.

The financial resources of eastern European countries, after nationalization of industry and land, were under total government control. All development and investment had to be financed by the state. In line with their commitment to communism, the first priority was building industry.

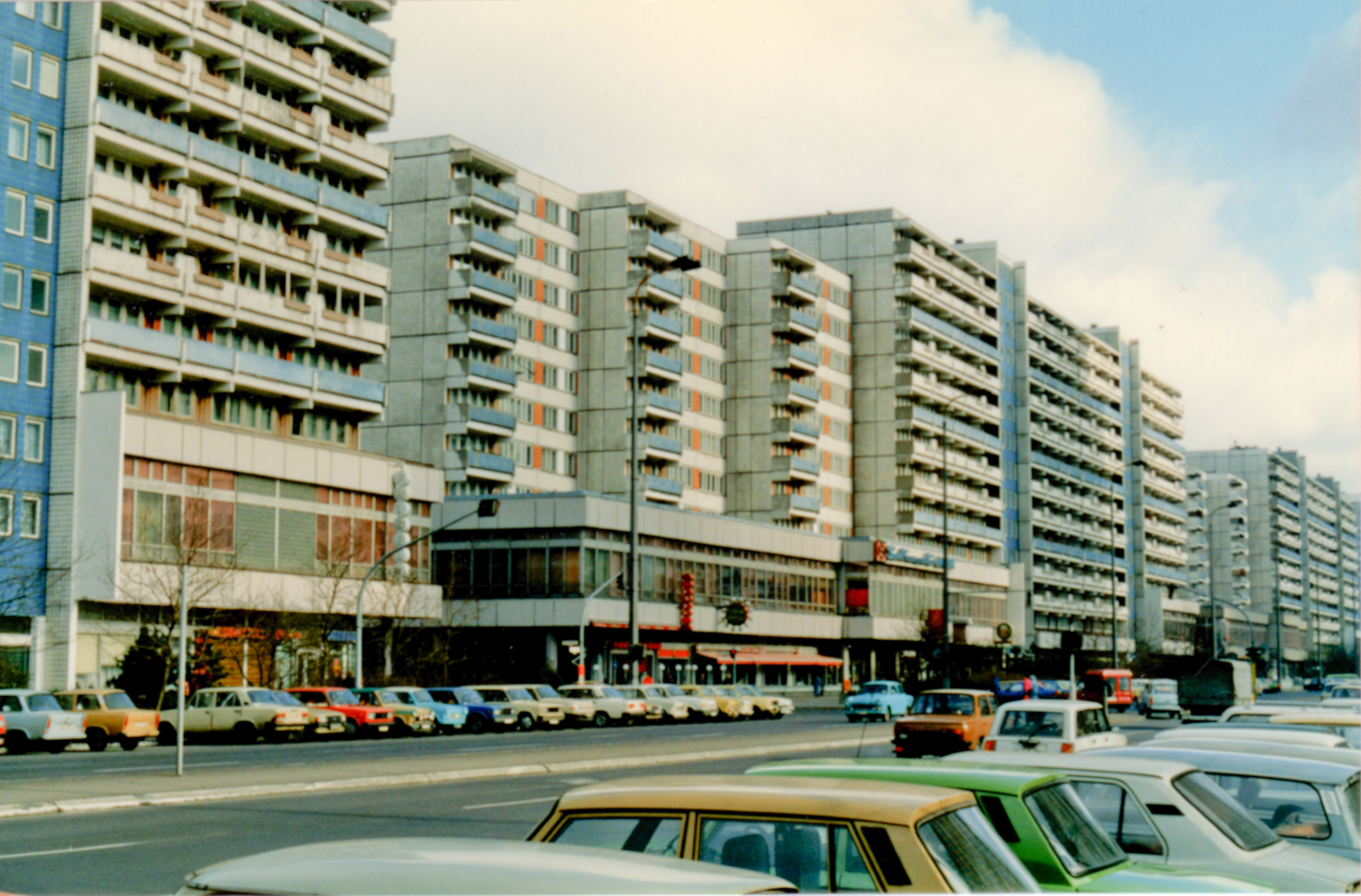
East Berlin in 1989

Therefore, for the first ten to fifteen years, most resources were directed towards the development of industry and the reconstruction of destroyed cities. In most cases, this reconstruction was executed without any urban planning for several reasons. Firstly, reconstruction had to start immediately as there was not enough time to develop a detailed plan. Secondly, the man-power and expertise for developing urban plans in great numbers were not available.

Oftentimes, destroyed cities were not rebuilt as they were before. Rather, entirely new cities were constructed along the principles of Soviet Socialism. However, the historically significant structures in some large cities were rebuilt. Experts worked to make the restoration resemble the original as much as possible. For example, the old city centre in Warsaw, the Zwinger in Dresden, and many historic buildings in Budapest were restored to their pre-war beauty.

In the late 1940s, the USSR developed a new type of high-rise. The first such buildings were built in Moscow: Moscow State University, Kotelnicheskaya Embankment Building, Kudrinskaya Square Building, Hilton Moscow Leningradskaya Hotel, Hotel Ukraina, Ministry of Foreign Affairs, Ministry of Heavy Industry. These were duplicated in some other countries, the main examples being the Palace of Culture and Science in Warsaw and the House of the Free Press in Bucharest. The Stalin Allee (subsequently named Karl-Marx-Allee) in East Berlin was also flanked by buildings having the same Stalinist style, though their concept was different from the Moscow high-rises. These buildings are mainly examples of a new architectural style, but did not involve urban planning to a significant extent, and there is no visible conceptual link between these buildings and their surroundings.

== Urban development in the 1960s and 1970s ==
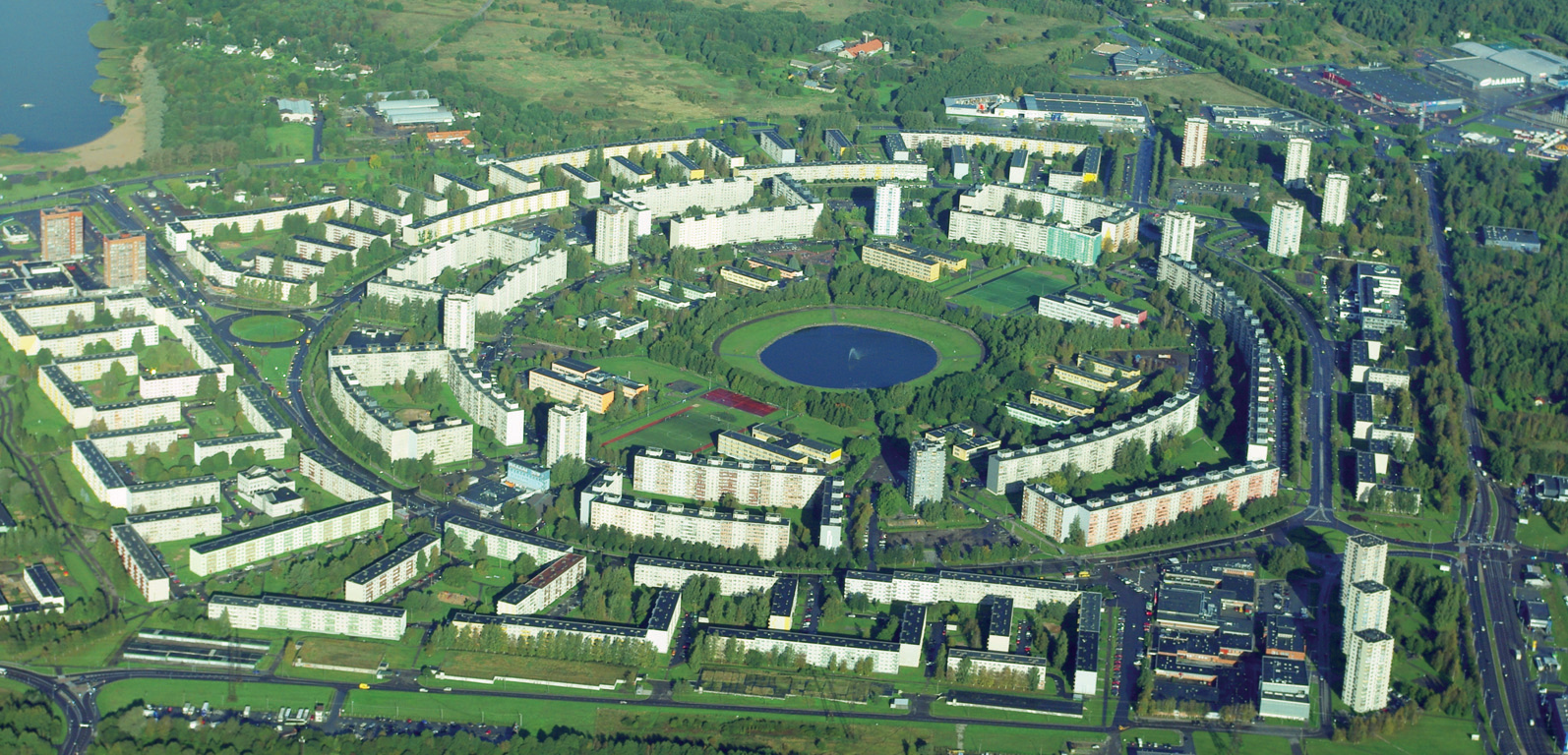
An oval shape microdistrict of Väike-Õismäe built in 1970s, Tallinn, Estonia

In big cities, few new housing units were constructed and the existing units were overcrowded. Around 1960, the USSR changed its policy and began an extensive program of construction of new apartment buildings, with the introduction of Khrushchevka and the subsequent introduction of Brezhnevka. This trend was immediately followed by all communist countries in Eastern Europe. The development of new neighborhoods in order to extend the housing capacity of cities required an extensive urban planning effort. In most cities, new development took place on the outskirts of the existing cities, incorporating suburbs or undeveloped land into the city. In cities in which slums existed, the slums were redeveloped with modern housing units.

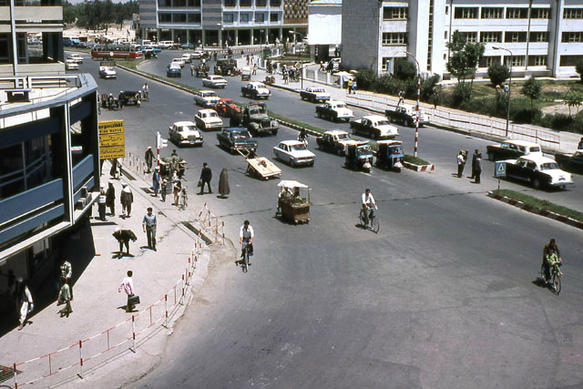
Downtown Kabul during the 1970s in Communist Afghanistan.

While the actual design and construction of the apartment buildings is not part of the urban planning exercise, the height and type of the buildings, the density of the buildings and other general characteristics were fixed by the planning exercise. Besides, the entire development of the infrastructure had to be planned. This included the transportation system and the roads, water supply, sewerage, power supply, shopping centers, schools and other infrastructure. Flood control was also a concern for cities located in flood prone areas. The planning also covered the industrial zones where new industries were to be located.

In some parts, urban problems were raised also due to other infrastructure, mainly to the development of waterways. The construction of reservoirs on big rivers in the proximity of cities created new waterfronts which had to be developed. This happened mainly in the Soviet Union, but also in other countries. Also some urban planning was required in the downtown districts where new official buildings were constructed. An example is the development of the area of the congress hall attached to the previous royal palace in the center of Bucharest.

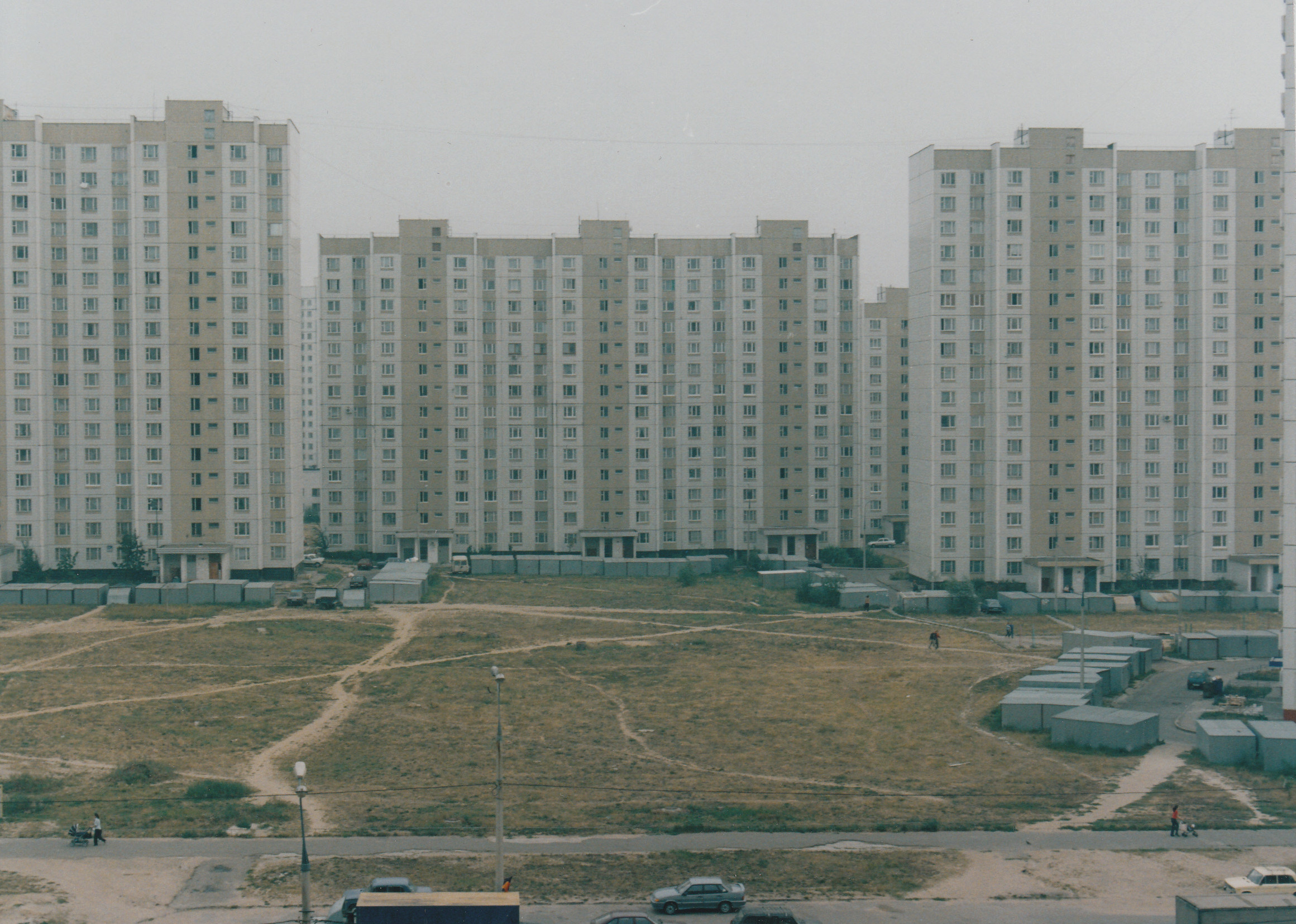
Standard buildings in Moscow, the late 1990s – early 2000s

=== Romania ===
In time, large-scale demolitions and enormous reconstruction projects of hamlets, villages, towns, and cities, in whole or in part, began to take shape. One of the largest and most ambitious of these developments began in 1974 with the goal of turning Romania into a "multilaterally developed socialist society". Urban planning, in Romania, began early on as displaced rural Romanians started flocking to the cities. With a "blank canvas" of land, the communist regime hoped to create hundreds of urban industrial centers via investment in schools, medical clinics, housing, and industry.

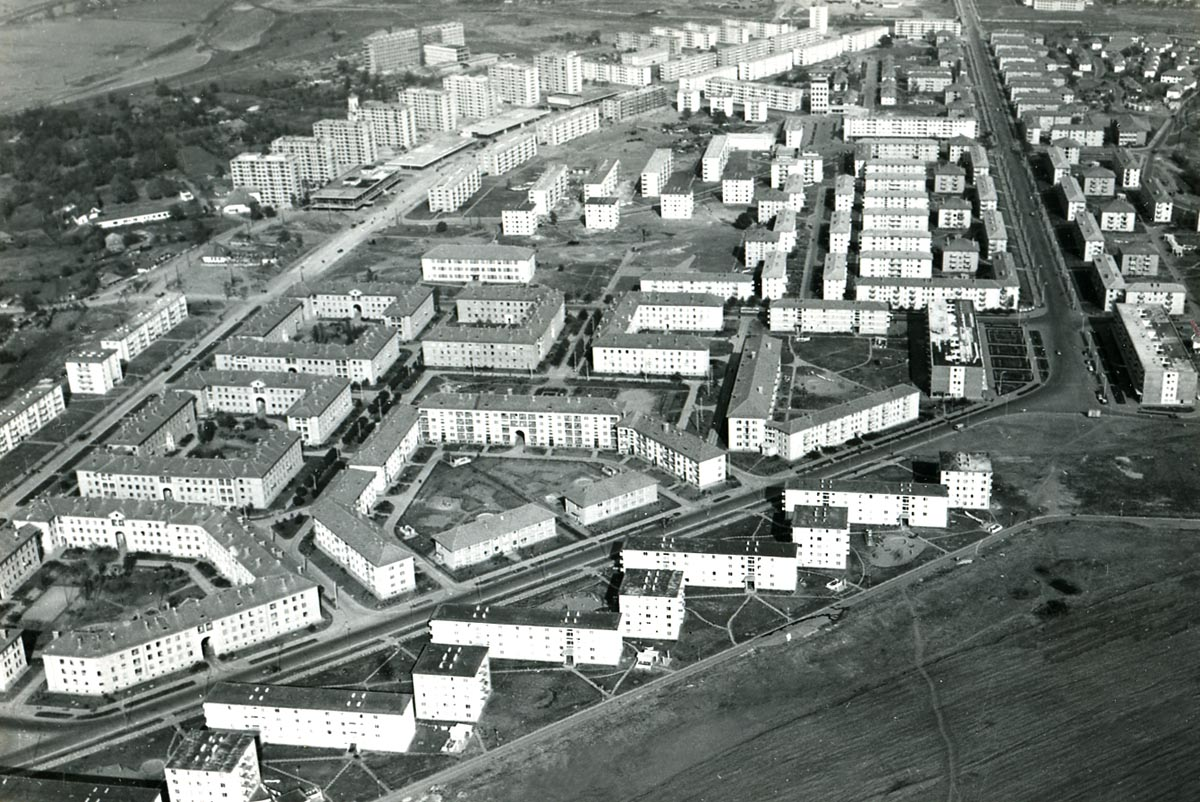
The town of Onești in the Moldavia region of Romania in the 1960s. The different architectural styles of the apartment blocks: pentagonal quartal (the nearest plan, with romanic vaults), blocks with prefabricated panels (4 floors) and blocks build with continuous concrete casting in sliding formworks (9 floors)

Although the systematization plan extended, in theory, to the entire country, initial work centered in Moldavia. It also affected such locales as Ceaușescu's own native village of Scorniceşti in Olt County: there, the Ceauşescu family home was the only older building left standing. The initial phase of systematization largely petered out by 1980, at which point only about 10 percent of new housing was being built in historically rural areas.

Given the lack of budget, in many regions systematization did not constitute an effective plan, good or bad, for development. Instead, it constituted a barrier against organic regional growth. New buildings had to be at least two stories high, so peasants could not build small houses. Yards were restricted to 250 square meters and private agricultural plots were banned from within the villages. Despite the obvious negative impact of such a scheme on subsistence agriculture, after 1981 villages were mandated to be agriculturally self-sufficient.

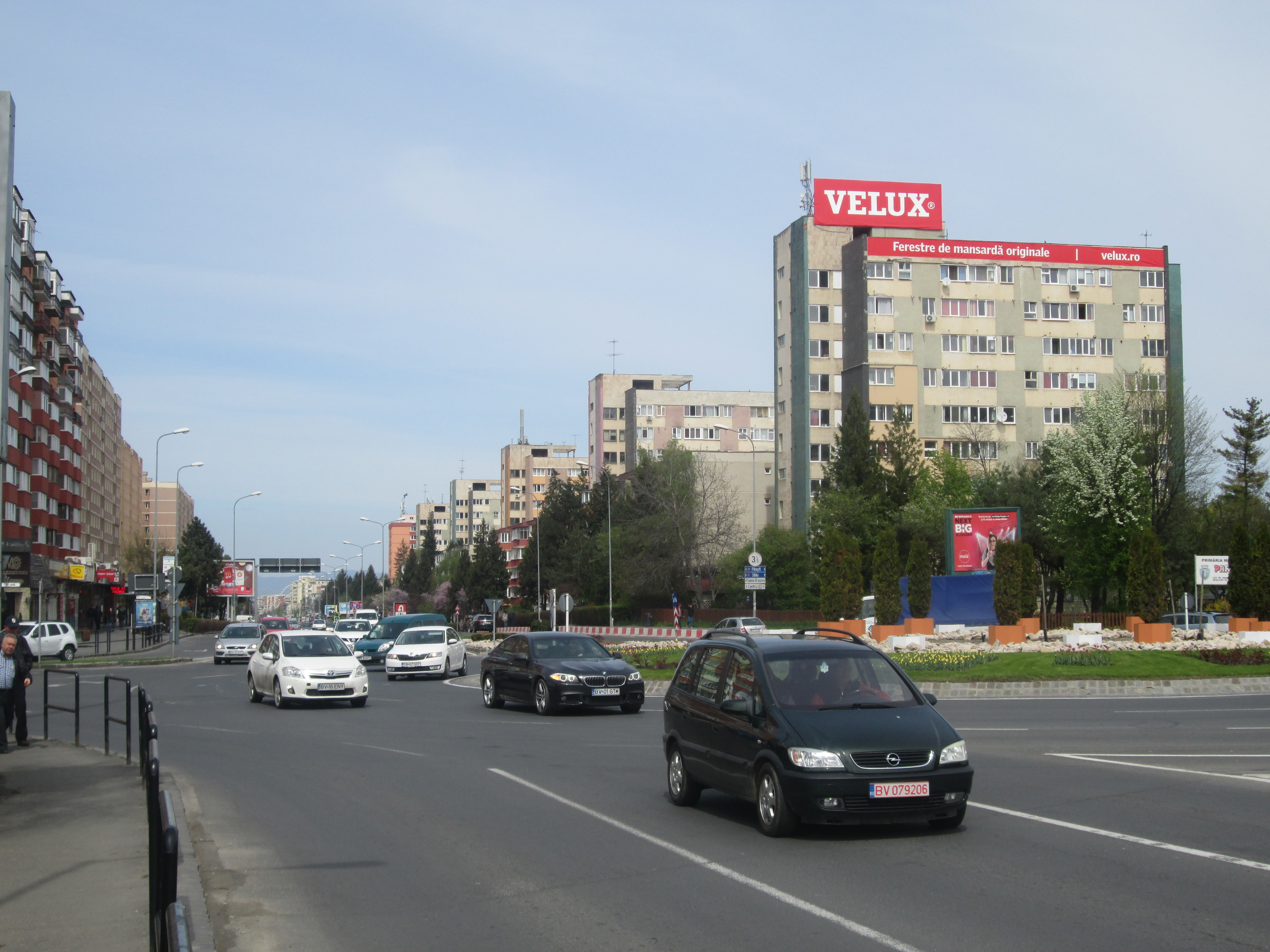
2017 photo of Astra, Brașov (1970s). This area was specifically developed for the workers of Autocamioane Brașov

In the mid-1980s the concept of systematization found new life, applied primarily to the area of the nation's capital, Bucharest. Nearby villages were demolished, often in service of large-scale projects such as a canal from Bucharest to the Danube – projects which were later abandoned by Romania's post-communist government. Most dramatically, eight square kilometers in the historic center of Bucharest were leveled. The demolition campaign erased many monuments including 3 monasteries, 20 churches, 3 synagogues, 3 hospitals, 2 theaters and a noted Art Deco sports stadium. This also involved evicting 40,000 people with only a single day's notice and relocating them to new homes, in order to make way for the grandiose Centrul Civic and the immense Palace of the People, a building second in size only to the Pentagon.

Urban planning, especially the destruction of historic churches and monasteries, was protested by several nations, especially Hungary and West Germany, each concerned for their national minorities in Transylvania. Despite these protests, Ceauşescu remained in the relatively good graces of the United States and other Western powers almost to the last, largely because his relatively independent political line rendered him a useful counter to the Soviet Union in Cold War politics.

== North Korea ==
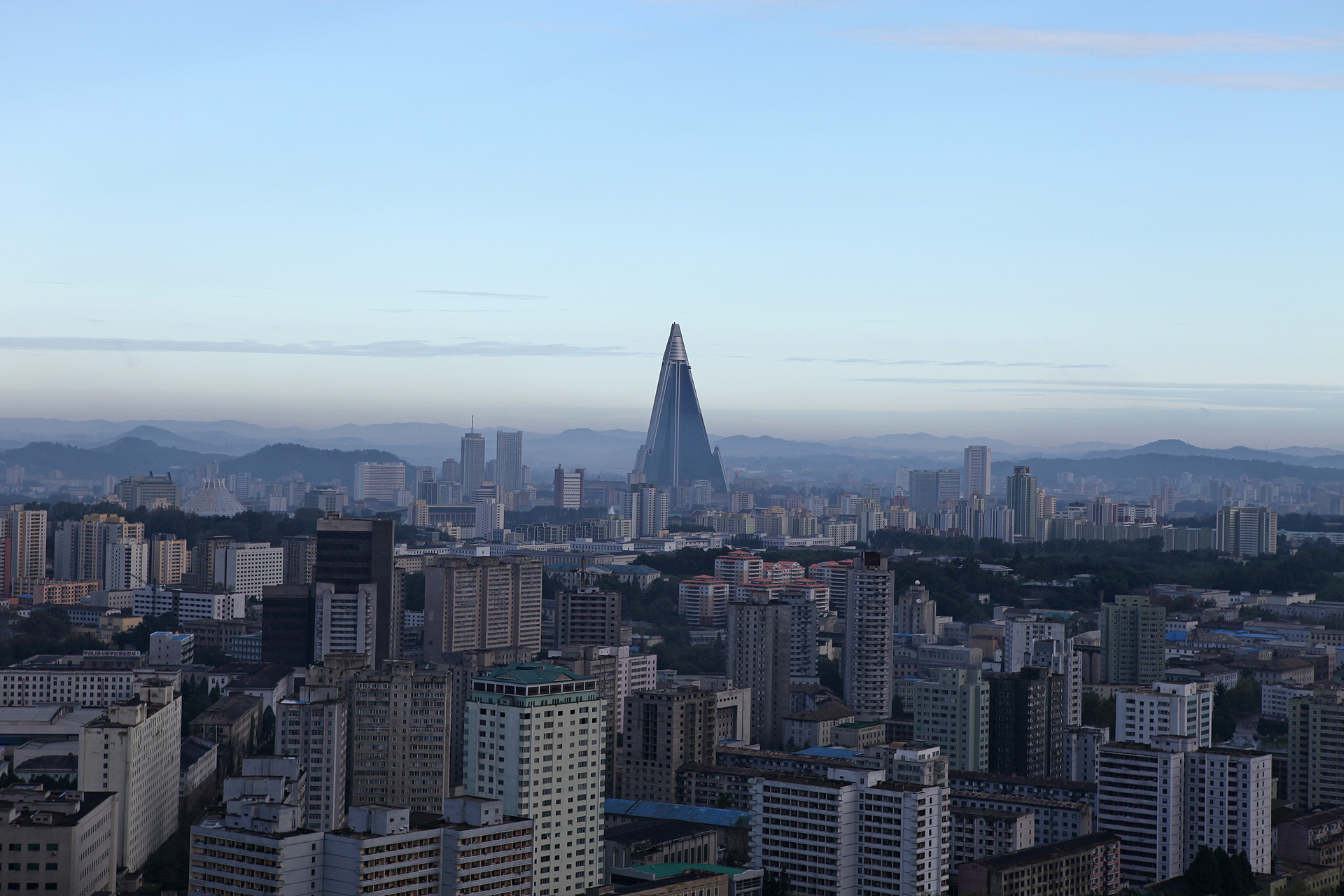
Skyline of Pyongyang

Pyongyang, the capital of North Korea, has a downtown consisting of hundreds of high-rise apartments. North Korean citizens are provided housing by the government, and the quality of said housing is dependent on social status and household size. The city also has several extraordinarily expansive public spaces that are usually built around colossal monuments depicting Juche ideologies and/or monuments relating to Kim Jong-il and Kim Il Sung.

Car ownership rates in Pyongyang are low, and thus public transportation is vital to the city. A two-line subway system serves the city, with a network of elaborate stations, many with high ceilings and murals on their walls. Additionally, an expansive tram network covers the city. There are no suburbs in Pyongyang as the government's city planning policies substitute lower density suburban expansion for high rise residential development in central areas.

== People's Republic of China ==
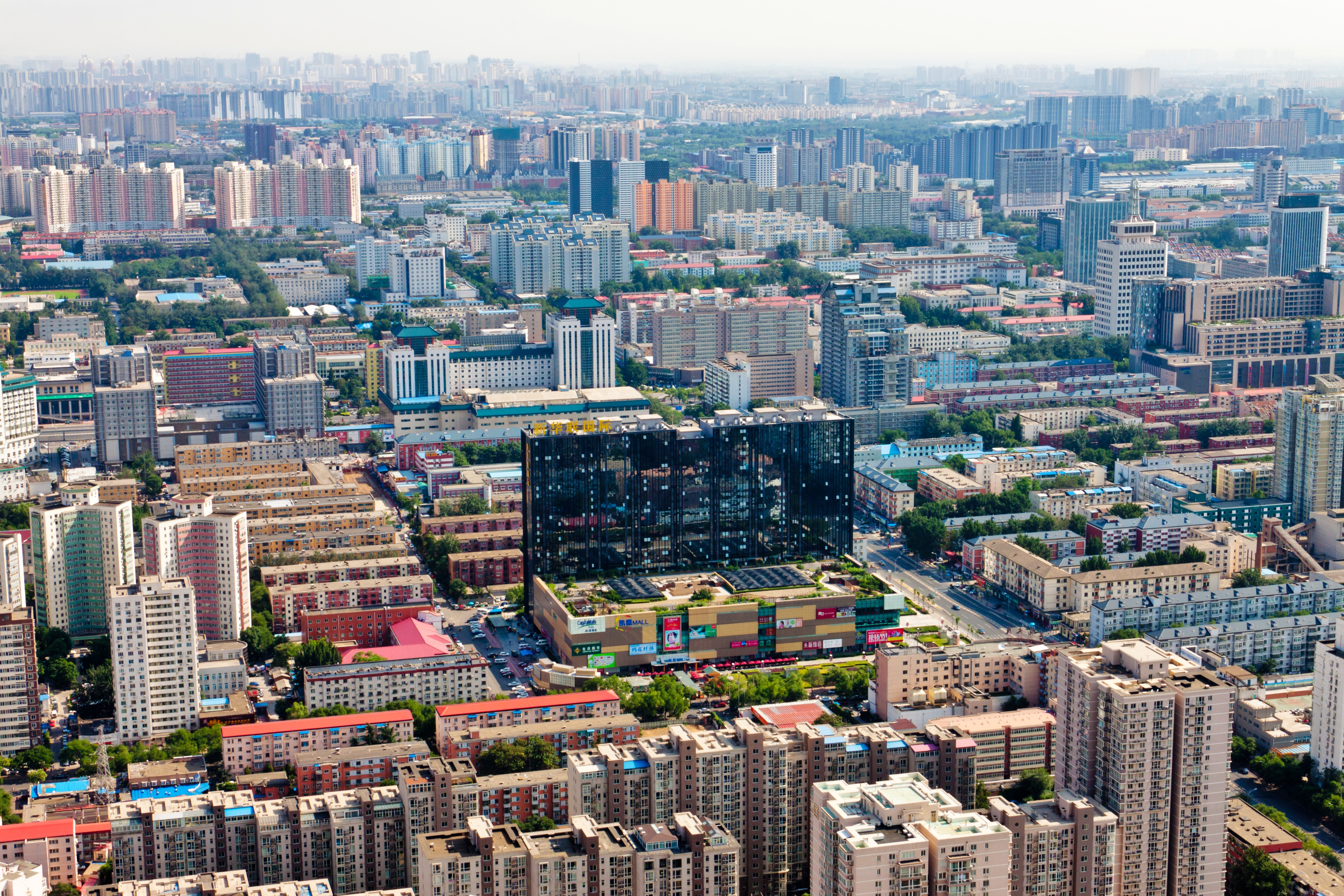
1950–1980s flats in a residential area in Haidian, Beijing

The development of urban planning in the People's Republic of China (PRC) demonstrates a unique approach with Chinese characteristics. It started after communist takeover in the early 1950s. Through implementing new national urban policies, communist planners first introduced urban planning by applying centralised economic planning and industrialisation, especially in heavy industry.

=== Phase 1 (1949–1960) ===
In September 1952, there were two significant policies promulgated at an urban development conference: "construction of key cities in co-ordination with the national economic development programme" and "establishment of urban planning structure to strengthen city development". These policies influenced China's urban planning significantly and at the same time were clearly defined by the main direction of the state – centralised economic and industrial development. During the First Five-year Plan (1953–58), the nation determined to develop 156 national key projects and 8 key industrial based cities. In this period, vast physical development projects such as industrial bases, community facilities and housing for workers were established to achieve national needs and goals. All of these projects were carried out with the aid of the experts from the Soviet Union, particularly in terms of urban economic development and physical urban design. Urban planning at that time was mainly based on Soviet planning principles and the model of the post-war Soviet planning practice. Soviet-style communist planning concentrated on "formalistic street patterns and grand design for public buildings and monuments, huge public squares, and the predominance of master plans". The role of communist planners during this period was to focus on location selection of factories and industrial plants, arrangement of service facilities, design of the layout of industrial towns, functional division of urban land use zones and development of residential districts. Historic preservation was not a priority during this period of development. For example, Mao Zedong allowed Beijing's city walls to be demolished despite their historical significance in order to make room for other uses. The bricks from the walls were used in new development projects ranging from homes to a subway system. By the end of 1959, there were 180 cities, 1400 towns and more than 2,000 suburban residential settlements that had been project plans prepared under communist planning.

=== Phase 2 (1961–1976) ===
From 1960 to 1976, due to the political climate changing, the development of urban planning in communist China had suffered severe catastrophes: planning institutions had to cease, planners were assigned to support development in rural areas and planning documents were destroyed or discarded. During the Great Leap Forward in the early 1960s, the utopian socialist planning development which particularly overemphasized large-scale urban development was seen as superior to Western-style planning. However, due to the severe limitations of fiscal and labor resources, the first priority of urban planning was given to utopian socialist principles and then the second place to people's livelihood. Thus, giving little attention to the establishment of residential amenities and facilities, there were significant social and physical imbalances resulting in urban development. For instance, in the historic hutong neighborhoods in Beijing, courtyards were routinely replaced with new residential structures in order to accommodate more residents. By the end of this phase, about 30% of these courtyards had residential structures placed on them. Additionally, some anti-urban movements, a typical example being the People's Commune Movement, took place in communist China during this period. The purpose of setting up a commune, seen as a sub-community within cities, was to spread industrial values from urban to rural areas so that eventually the urban-rural gap would be eliminated.

=== Phase 3 (1977–1984) ===
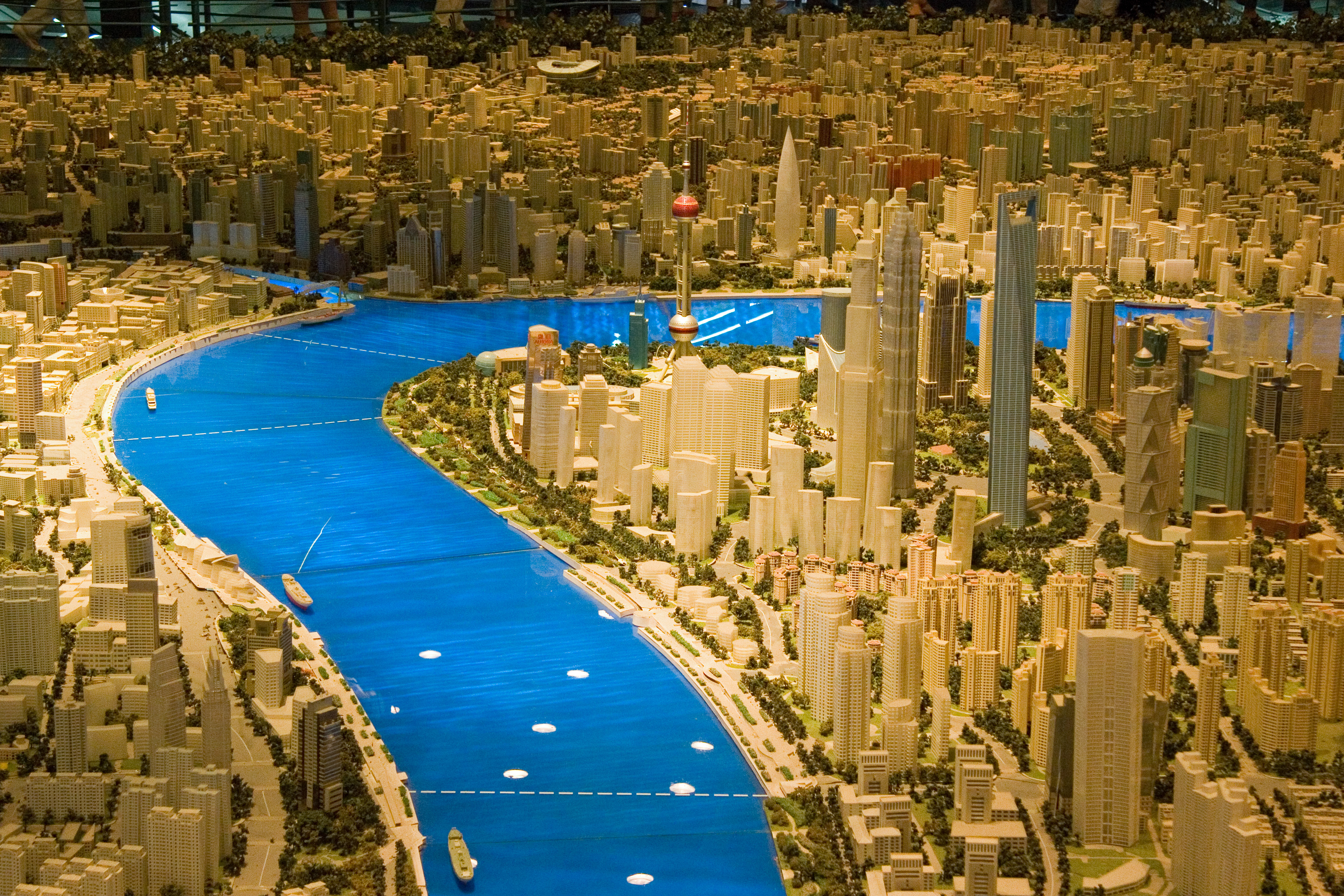
Shanghai Urban Planning Museum

In December 1978, a new era of economic and political reform had begun and accelerated. The major concern of urban planning in communist China shifted to the recognition of the function of cities. Consequently, a nationwide effective force to restore urban master plans was started. By the end of 1984, 241 cities and 1,071 counties throughout the nation as a whole completed their master plans. Although these master plans might not technically fulfill the needs of urban development, they at least acted as guidelines to lead to planned and organised urban construction. In addition, some concepts of mega-metropolitan areas were established during this period.

=== Phase 4 (1985–present) ===
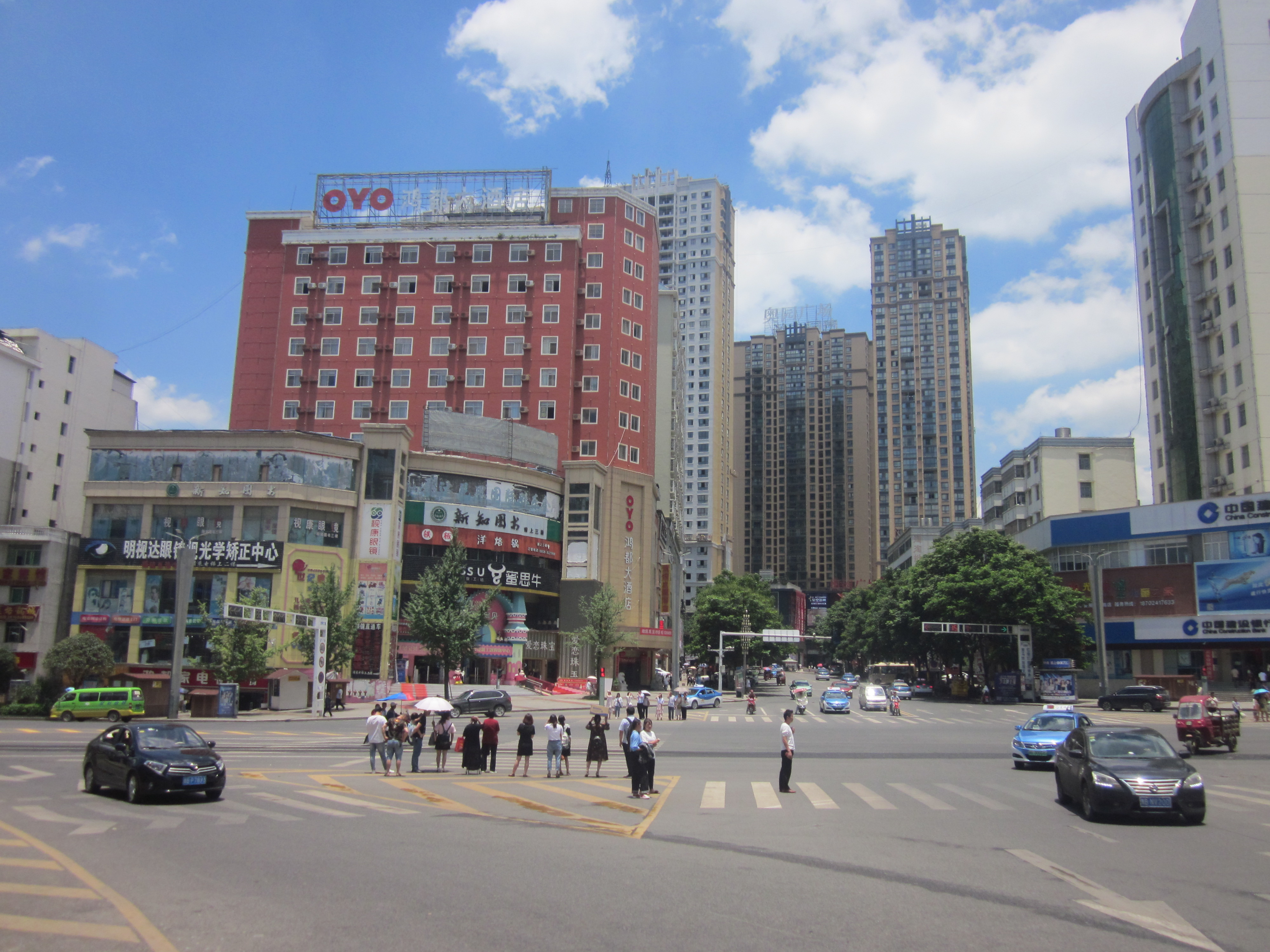
Tall buildings in Panzhou, Guizhou, China, 21 June 2019.

Contemporary urban planning in China is undergoing rapid, unprecedented urbanization and industrialization. In fact, China's urbanization rate was almost 50% by the year 2010, a stark contrast from previous decades. Based upon the current Chinese Urban and Rural Planning Act, two tiers – master plan and detailed plan – make up the Chinese urban planning system. Reviewing the history of urban planning in China, the contemporary planning norm is neither simply following Soviet-style planning nor prohibiting advanced Western viewpoints of urban development. Urban renewal and redevelopment are common themes in contemporary Chinese planning. Large swathes of major cities are sometimes torn down at once to allow for new uses. In some cases, residents simply refuse to move out and developers have to adjust their plans accordingly. These residents have been dubbed "nail houses" or "dingzi hu", and there have been many famous cases of these holdouts in Chinese media.

== Socialist Federal Republic of Yugoslavia ==
Post-WWII SFR Yugoslavia followed in line with the earlier urbanist experiments of the Soviet Union, and often delved in urban planning projects. The best known example would be the Novi Zagreb (eng. "New Zagreb") urban development scheme of the Zagreb city – the capital of the Socialist republic of Croatia. The district is mostly residential, consisting of blocks of flats and tower blocks that were built during the Socialist era (1945–1990). Although it is not as prestigious as downtown Zagreb, it has been praised for its good road network, public transportation connections and abundance of parks.

The project was started by the mayor of Zagreb, Većeslav Holjevac, as there was a large expanse of empty and undeveloped land south of the Sava river. The land was seized from the Captol church administration following the victory of the communist partisans in World War II. The mayor, seeing the opportunity to set in motion the building of a completely new and modern city under the socialist administration, promptly organized a team of urbanist designers and city planners.

The first complete solution for habitation with public and commercial contents was made for the neighborhood Trnsko by urbanists Zdenko Kolacio, Mirko Maretić and Josip Uhlik with horticulturist Mira Wenzler-Halambek in 1959–1960. It was followed by plans for neighborhood Zapruđe in 1962–1963, also made by Josip Uhlik.

The project was lauded as a great success, the district being known for its large amounts of foliage and recreational areas, including parks, museums and sports fields. A lot of care also went into building a modernized and efficient system of transportation and mass transit, such as tram and bus lines which were built by 1979. Lauding a typical Eastern bloc architectural style, it was designed to house a large capacity of residents, as the construction of the area was in part driven by the need for workforce to fuel the Zagreb industrialization projects recently put in motion. It also has examples of brutalist architecture, rare for the late period the area was constructed in.

== See also ==
- Eastern Bloc economies
- Sotsgorod: Cities for Utopia
- Soviet urban planning ideologies of the 1920s
- Urban planning
- Large panel system building

Eastern bloc housing:

- Panelák (Czechoslovakia)
- Panelház (Hungary)
- Plattenbau (East Germany)
- Ugsarmal bair (Mongolian People's Republic)
