= Zuev Workers' Club =

Clubhouse in Moscow, built in the constructivist style

Coordinates: 55°46′45″N 37°35′24″E

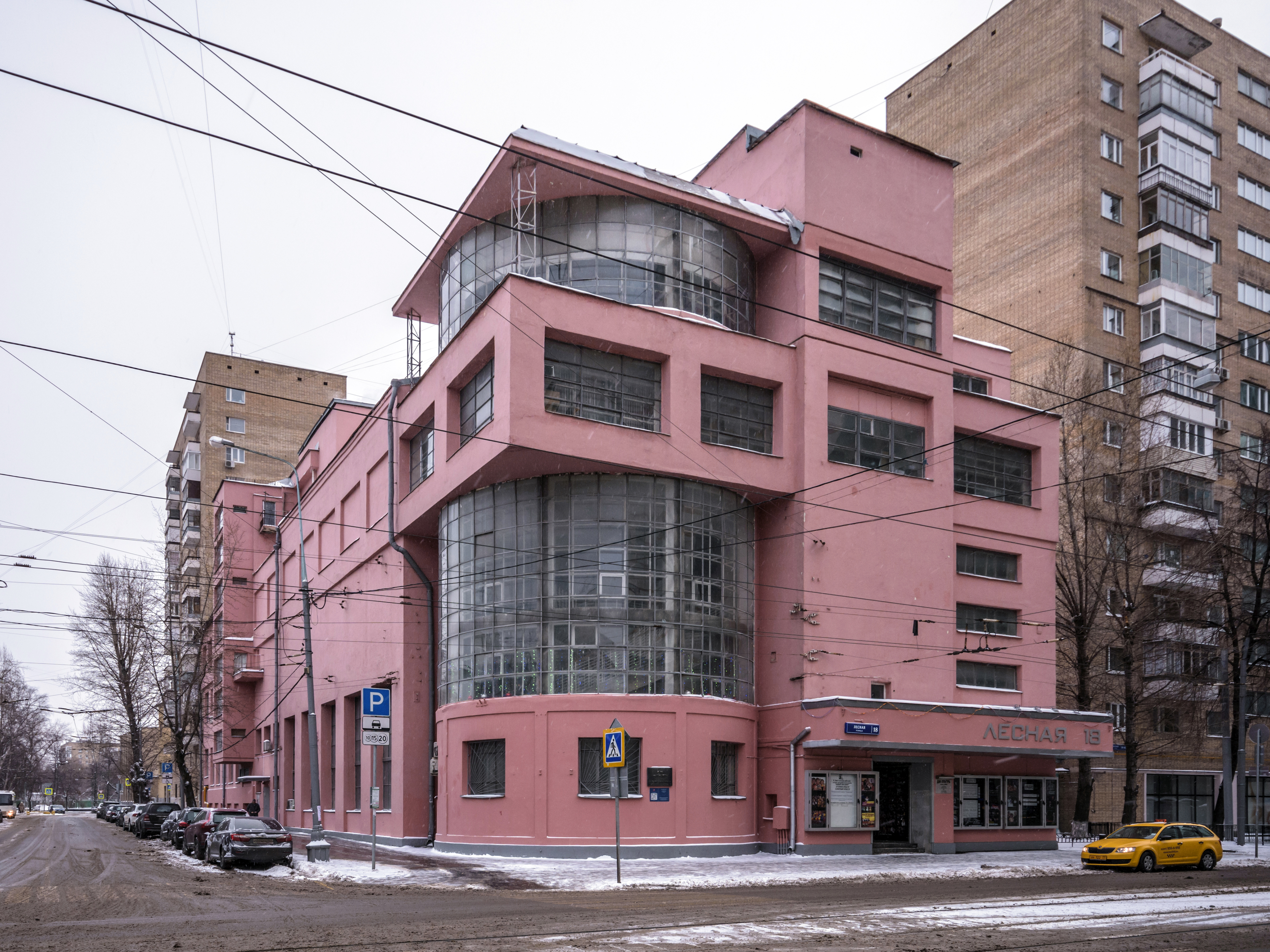
Zuev Workers' Club in 2016

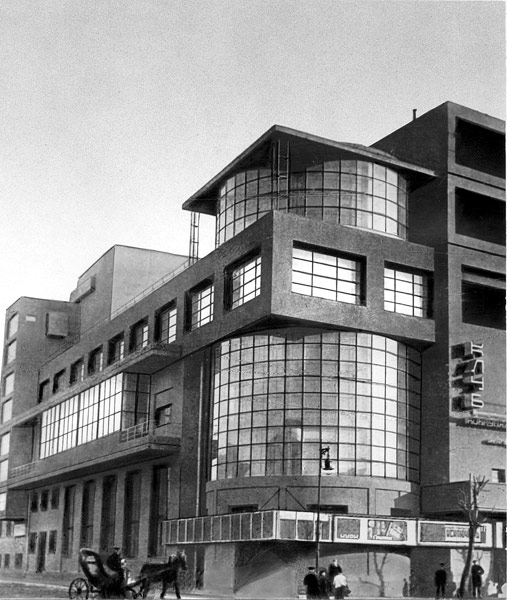
Zuev Workers' Club, 1929

The Zuyev Workers' Club (Russian: Клуб имени Зуева) in Moscow is a prominent work of constructivist architecture. It was designed by Ilya Golosov (1883–1945) in 1927 and finished in 1929. The building was designed to house various facilities for Moscow workers, and utilises an innovative glazing treatment at its corner which has proved very photogenic.

Golosov was an enthusiast for expressive, dynamic form rather than the logics of Constructivist design methods. The building facade consists of cylindrical glazed staircases intersecting with stacked rectangular floor planes to create a dramatic composition. A sequence of club rooms and open foyers lead to an 850-seat auditorium.

Since Golosov's time some of the fenestration has been bricked over, reducing the original perforated cubic mass into a more solid box.
