= Panteleimon Golosov =

Soviet architect

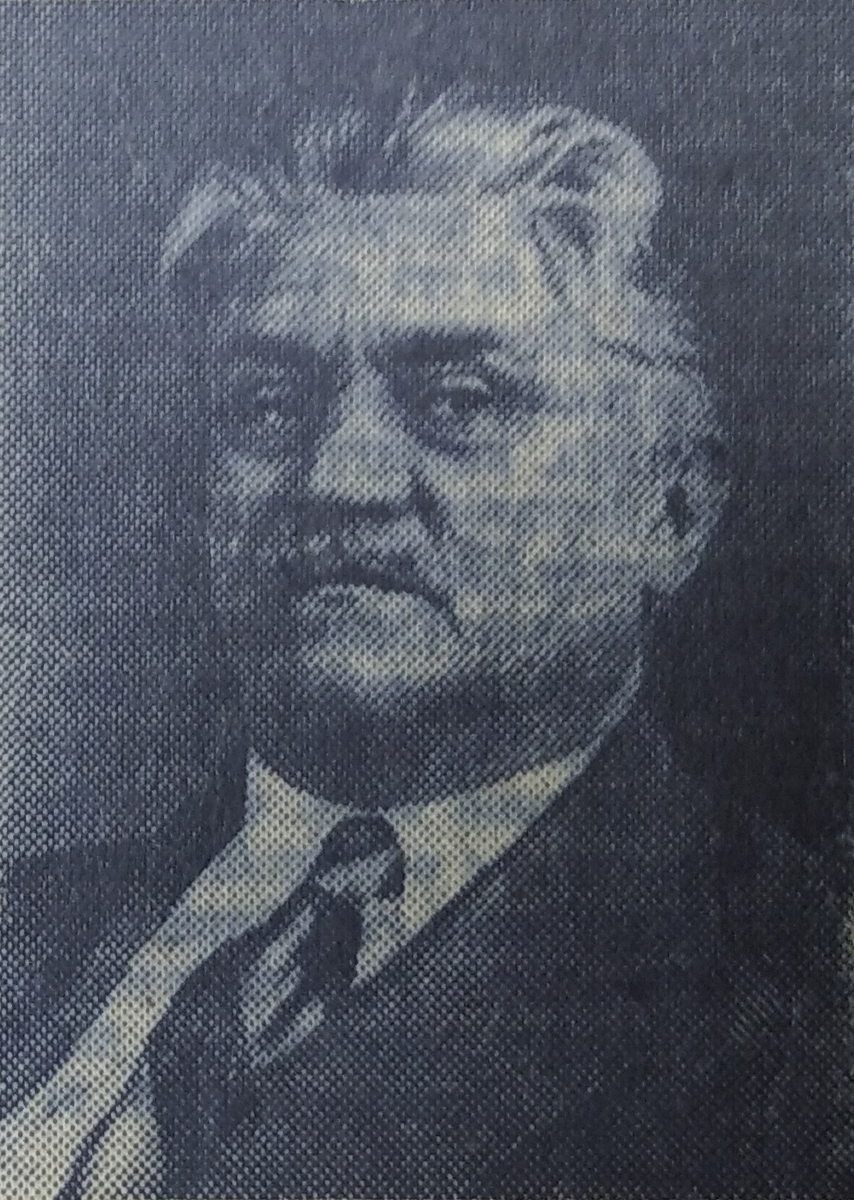
Golosov in 1937

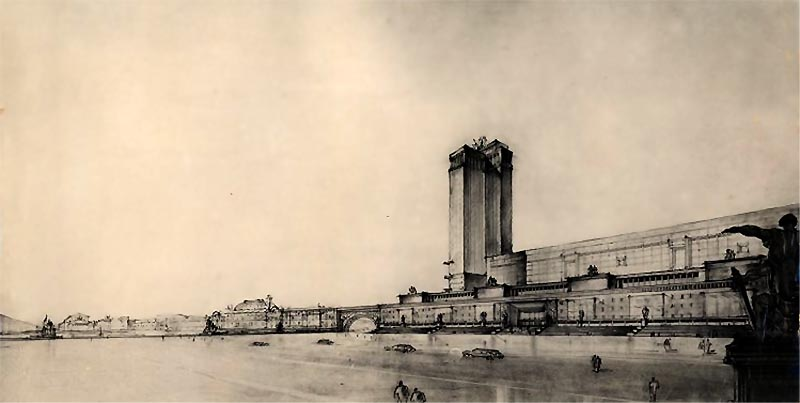
A drawing by Golosov for the competition for the Narkomtiazhprom building, Moscow

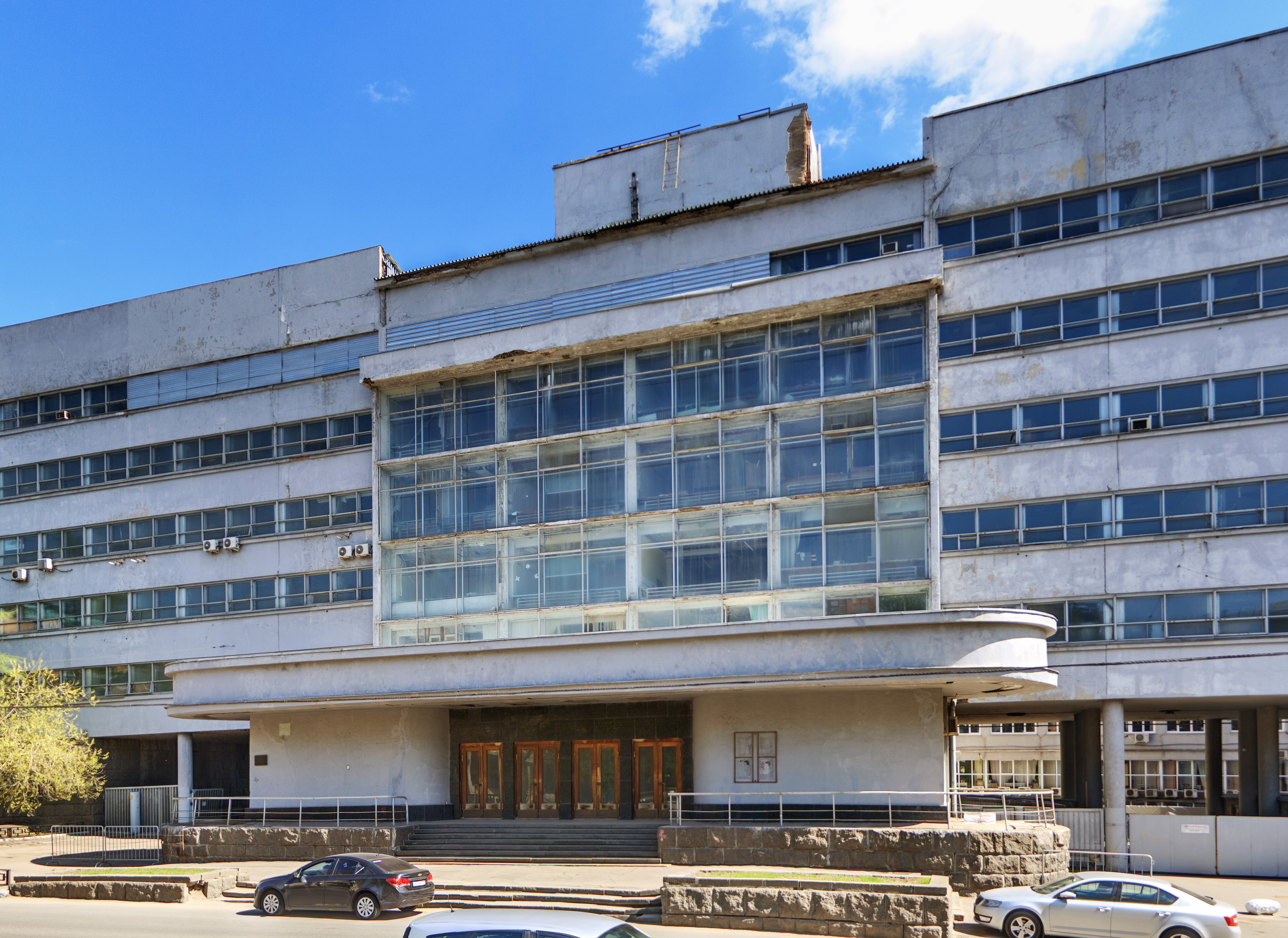
Pravda building, Moscow

Panteleimon Alexandrovich Golosov (1882, Moscow – 1945, Moscow) was a Constructivist architect from the Soviet Union and brother of Ilya Golosov.

== Career ==
Golosov graduated from the Moscow School of Painting, Sculpture and Architecture in 1911. From 1918 he taught at the State Free Artist Studios (Svomas), then at VKhUTEMAS and at the Moscow Architectural Institute. He later became a member of the OSA Group.

== Selected works ==
- 1919 - Worked under Alexey Shchusev and Ivan Zholtovsky on Moscow City planning.
- 1923 - Series of pavilions for the All-Russian Agricultural and Handicraft Industries Exhibition, Moscow.
- 1924 - Competition entry for the Exposition Internationale des Arts Décoratifs et Industriels Modernes.
- 1930–1934 - Designed and built the headquarters and printing works for the Pravda newspaper, Moscow.

== See also ==
- OSA Group
