= Mikhail Okhitovich =

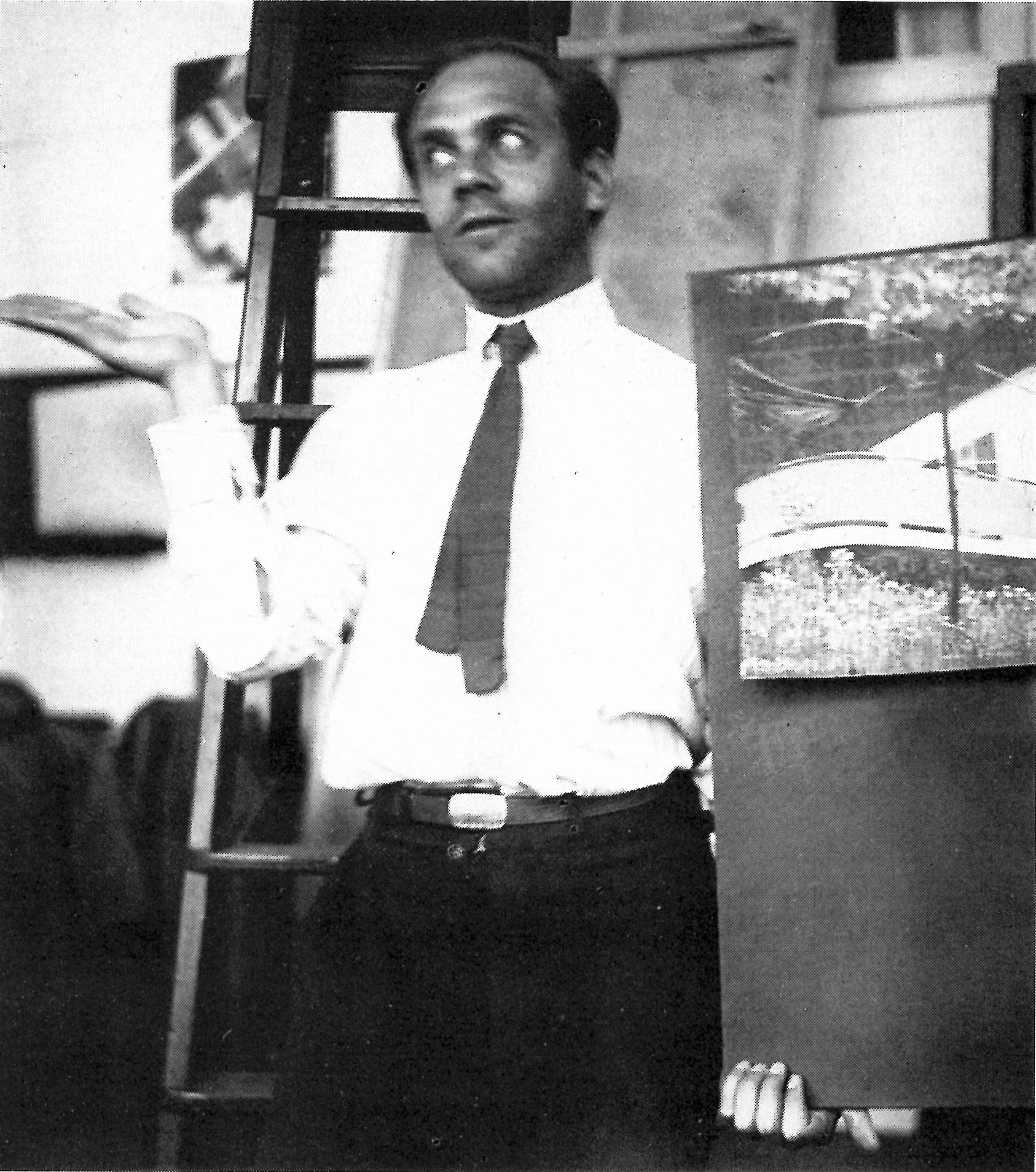
Mikhail Okhitovich

Mikhail Aleksandrovich Okhitovich (Russian: Михаи́л Алекса́ндрович Охито́вич) (1896–1937) was a Soviet sociologist, town planner and Constructivist architectural theorist, most famous for his 'Disurbanist' proposals of 1929–30.

Okhitovich, born in Saint Petersburg, joined the Bolshevik Party in 1917 and served in the Red Army from then until 1925. He became a supporter of the Left Opposition of Leon Trotsky, leading to his expulsion in 1928. He was readmitted to the Party in 1930, at which time his theories were garnering a great deal of attention. Disurbanism, which he propounded mainly via the OSA Group's journal SA, is a theory resembling Frank Lloyd Wright's Broadacre City: an abandonment of the metropolis in favour of a diffuse, partly agricultural but technologically advanced network. His proposals were, along with other OSA members, the basis of the rejected Magnitogorsk plan of 1930 and a 'Green City' competition of the same year. Le Corbusier's riposte to Okhitovich's proposals would become the Ville Radieuse.

In 1933 Okhitovich was reprimanded by the Communist Party and in 1935, a speech of his in which he defended Constructivism and attacked the Stalinist 'cult of hierarchy' and nationalism caused consternation. A campaign led by Karo Alabyan and Arkady Mordvinov led to his arrest the same year. He was sent to the Gulag, where he died 1937.
