= Ivan Leonidov =

Soviet architect (1902–1959)

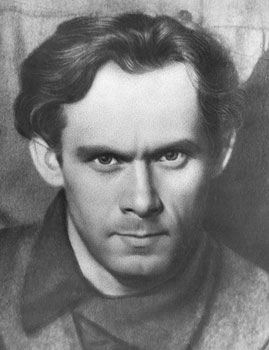
- Leonidov in 1927
- Born: 9 February 1902; Tver Governorate, Russia
- Died: 6 November 1959 (aged 57); Moscow, Soviet Union
- Occupations: Architect, urban planner, painter

Ivan Ilyich Leonidov (Russian: Иван Ильич Леонидов; 9 February 1902 – 6 November 1959) was a Soviet constructivist architect, urban planner, painter and teacher.

== Early life ==
Leonidov was raised on an isolated farmstead in the province of Tver Oblast. The son of a farmer and woodsman, he went to work as a casual labourer at the docks in Petrograd. When an icon painter noticed Leonidov's drawing skills, he became his apprentice.

== Career ==
In 1919 Leonidov attended the Svomas free art studios in Tver. From 1921 to 1927 he studied at the VKhUTEMAS in Moscow under the tutelage of Alexander Vesnin at which point his attention switched from painting to architecture.

His unexecuted diploma project in 1927 for the Lenin Institute and Library, Moscow, brought him international recognition. The scheme was prominently displayed at the Exhibition of Contemporary Architecture, Moscow, and was published in the OSA Group journal Sovremennaya arkhitektura. He then went on to teach at the VKhUTEMAS between 1928 and 1930.

From 1931 to 1933 he worked in the Giprogor Russian Institute of Urban and Investment Development and Mossoviet and from 1934–41 he joined the studio of Moisei Ginzburg at the People's Commissariat for heavy industry.

Leonidov's only materialized design was the 1938 staircase in Kislovodsk.

== Selected works ==
- 1926 – Design for Izvestia printworks in Moscow (VKhUTEMAS studio with Alexander Vesnin)
- 1927 – Thesis (diploma) Lenin Institute and Library in Moscow (unexecuted)
- 1928 – Competition entry for the building of the Centrosojuz in Moscow
- 1928 – Club of the New Social Type. Variant B
- 1929 – Design for the Columbus monument in Santo Domingo
- 1929–-1930 – Competition entry for the House of Industry in Moscow
- 1930 – Competition entry for the culture palace of the proletarian district in Moscow
- 1930 – Competition entry for the socialist city Magnitogorsk (director/conductor of a group of students of the VChUTEIN)
- 1934 – Competition entry for the Narkomtiazhprom building (The People's Commissariat for heavy industry in Moscow), Red Square, Moscow.
- 1937–-1938 – Outside staircase in the Ordzonikidze sanatorium in Kislovodsk
- 1937–-1941 – Pioneer palace in Kalinin (Tver)
- 1950s – Sketch drafts for the "sun city" and the seat of the United Nations

== See also ==
- OSA Group

== Sources ==
- Cooke, Catherine; et al. (1990). Architectural Drawings of the Russian Avant-Garde. The Museum of Modern Art. ISBN 0-87070-556-3.
- Meriggi, Maurizio; et al. (2007). Una città possibile. Architetture di Ivan Leonidov 1926–1934. Electa. ISBN 978-88-370-5445-8.
- De Magistris, Alessandro; et al. (2009). Ivan Leonidov 1902–1959. Electa.
