= Moisei Ginzburg =

Soviet constructivist architect (1892–1946)

Moisei Yakovlevich Ginzburg
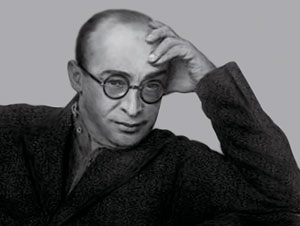
- Moisei Ginzburg in 1920
- Born: 4 June [O.S. 23 May] 1892; Minsk, Minsk Governorate, Russian Empire
- Died: 7 January 1946 (aged 53); Moscow, Russian SFSR, Soviet Union
- Occupation: Architect
- Buildings: Narkomfin Building, 1929

Moisei Yakovlevich Ginzburg (Belarusian: Майсей Якаўлевіч Гінзбург, Russian: Моисей Яковлевич Гинзбург; 4 June [O.S. 23 May] 1892 – 7 January 1946) was a Soviet constructivist architect, best known for designing the 1929 Narkomfin Building in Moscow.

== Biography ==
=== Education ===
Ginzburg (also known as Ginsberg) was born in Minsk into a Jewish family of architects. He graduated from the Milan Academy of Fine Arts in 1914 and the Riga Polytechnical Institute in 1917. During Russian Civil War, he lived in the Crimea, before relocating to Moscow in 1921. There, he joined the faculty of VKhUTEMAS and the Institute of Civil Engineers, institutions that later merged into the Moscow State Technical University.

=== Ideologist of Constructivism ===
Ginzburg was the founder of the OSA Group (Organisation of Contemporary Architects), which maintained close intellectual ties with Vladimir Mayakovsky and Osip Brik's LEF Group. In 1924, he published Style and Epoch, an influential work of architectural theory that has often been compared to Le Corbusier's Vers une architecture. The book functioned as a manifesto for Constructivist Architecture, a movement that combined advanced technology and engineering principles with socialist ideology.

The OSA experimented with communal housing models, including communal apartments designed to support the new Soviet way of life. Its journal, SA (Sovremennaya Arkhitektura, or Contemporary Architecture), featured discussions of urban planning and communal living, as well as visionary architectural projects, notably those of Ivan Leonidov. The group was dissolved in the early 1930s and absorbed into the All-Union Association of Architects, along with the rival modernist group ASNOVA, led by Nikolai Ladovsky, and the proto-Stalinist VOPRA.

=== Communal houses ===
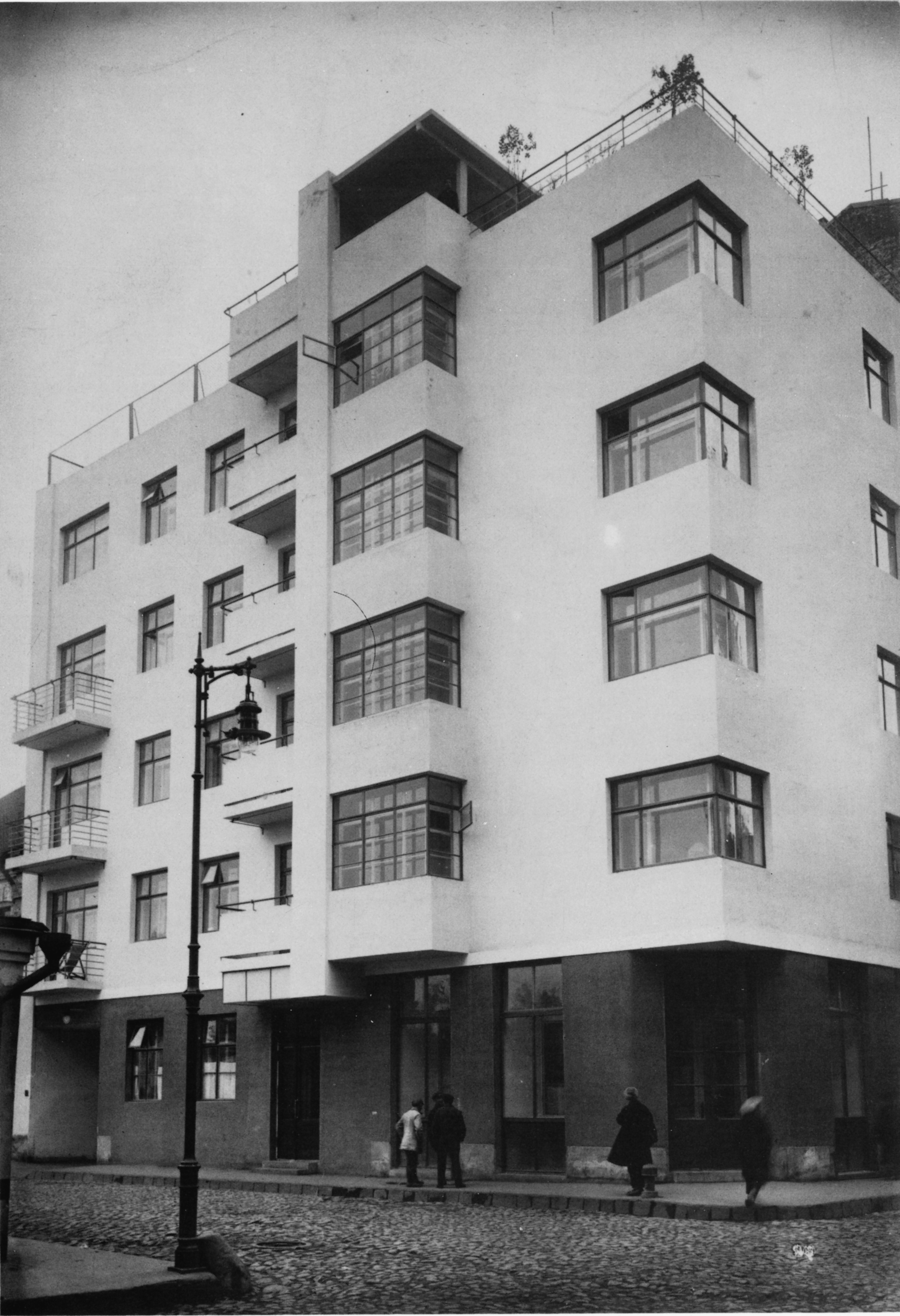
Gosstrakh Apartments, Moscow (1926).

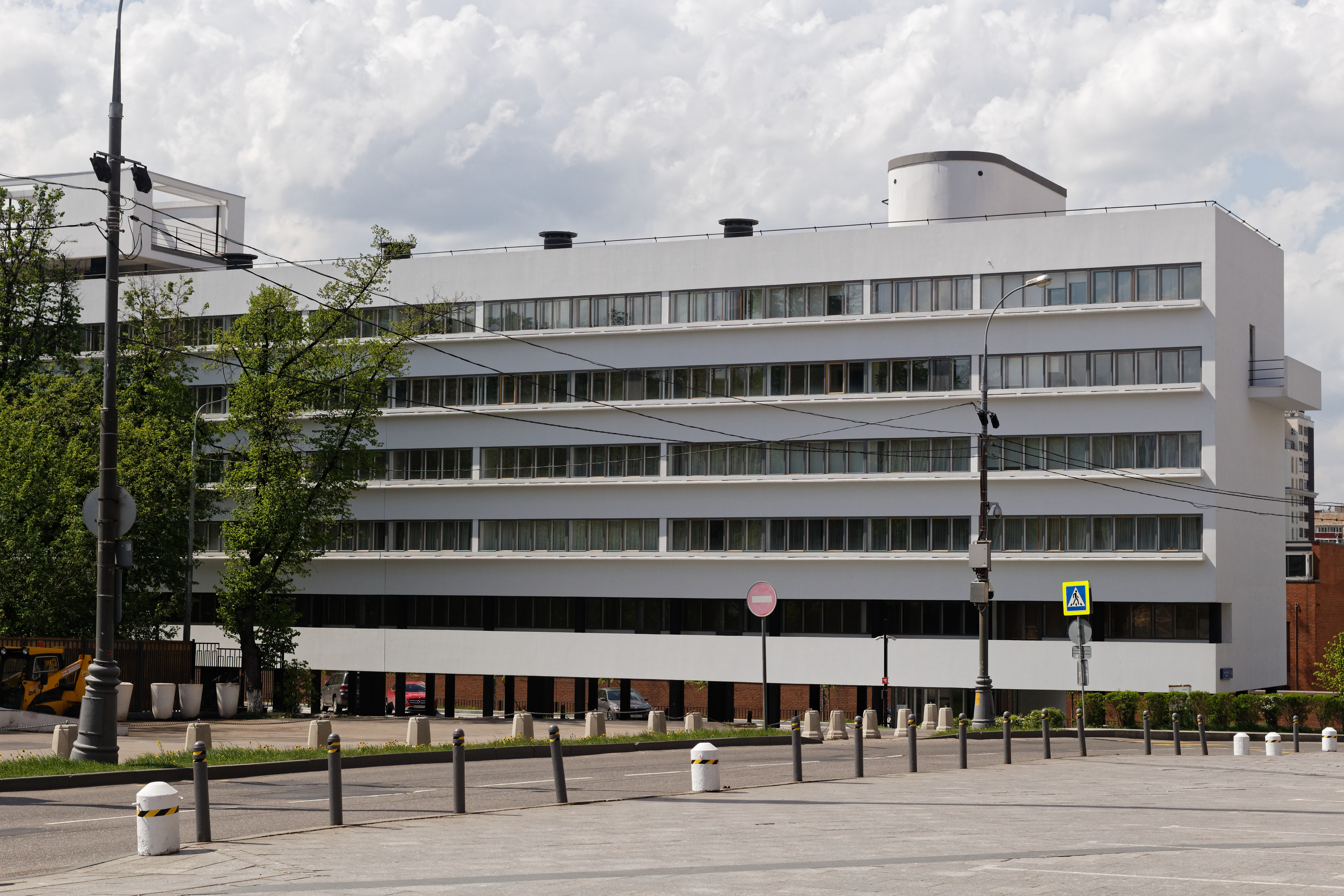
Apartment building Narkomfin, Moscow (1930).

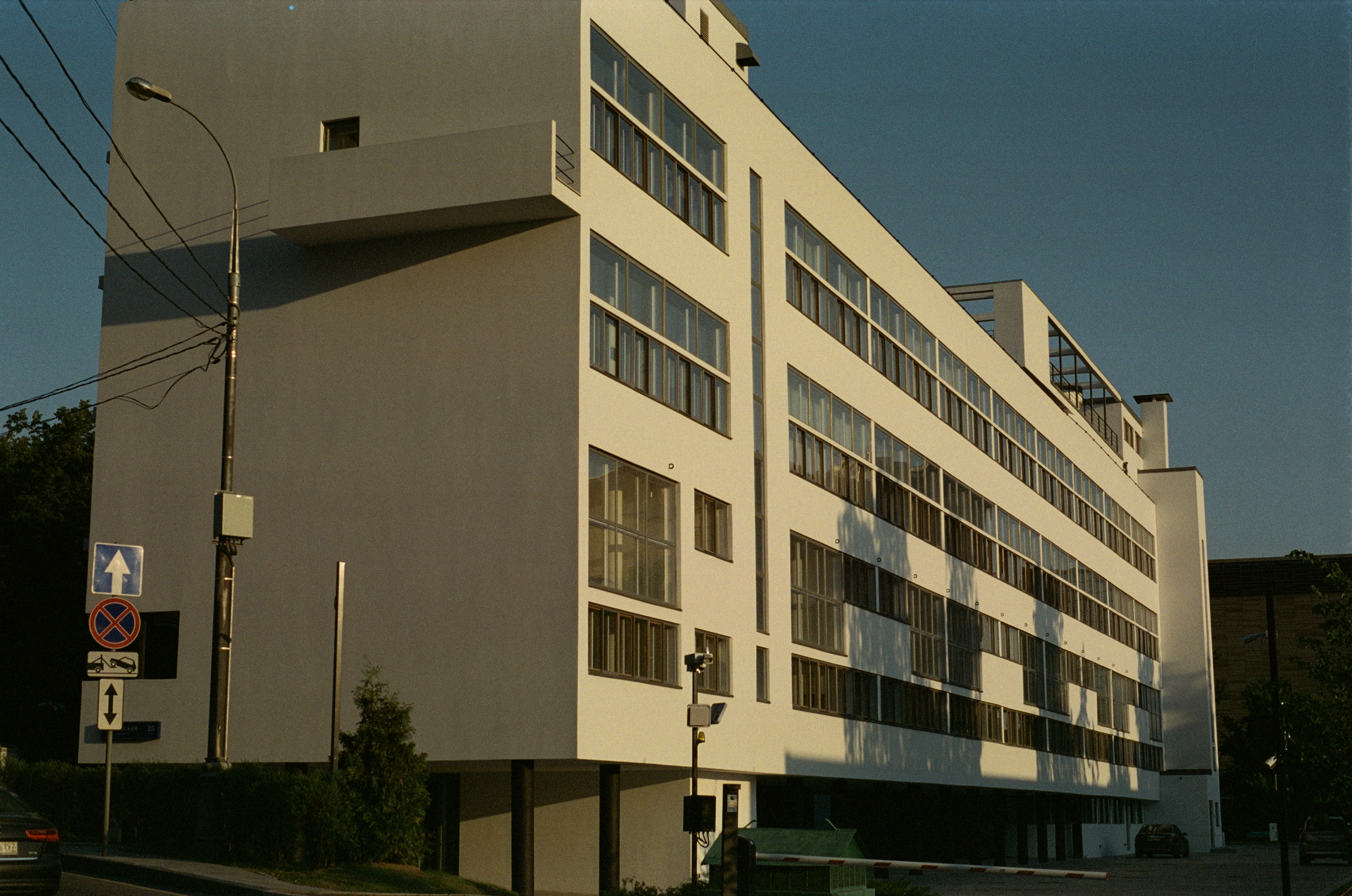
The west side of the Narkomfin, Moscow (1930).

The earliest of these projects was the Gosstrakh apartments on Malaya Bronnaya Street in Moscow, designed in 1926. One of the apartments was rented by Sergei Tretyakov. These flats represented the first application in the USSR of Le Corbusier's 'Five Points of Modern Architecture'. A similar building was constructed according to Ginzburg's 1928 design in Sverdlovsk (21 Malysheva Street), and was completed in 1932.

This project was followed three years later by the Narkomfin Building, conceived as a 'social condenser' intended to embody socialist principles in its architectural form. The apartment complex was built for employees of the People's Commissariat of Finance (or 'Narkomfin') and featured shared facilities, roof gardens, and a park-like setting. The Narkomfin building was acknowledged by Le Corbusier as an influence on his Unité d'Habitation. The layout of its duplex apartments was later adapted by Moshe Safdie in his Expo 67 housing project, as well as by Denys Lasdun in his residential development at St James', London.

Since the 1980s, the building has remained in a prolonged state of disrepair and has been listed three times among the 'World's 100 Major Buildings in Danger of Destruction'. It has since been restored in a project led by Ginzburg's grandson Alexey Ginzburg and now operates as residental apartments.

In 1928, Ginzburg also designed the Government Building in Alma-Ata (now the Kazakh National Academy of Arts), which was completed in 1931. During the early 1930s, he increasingly focused on urban planning, producing projects ranging from practical schemes, such as the Ufa city plan, to utopian proposals, including his entry for the "Green City" competition for a large residential district on the outskirts of Moscow. From 1928 to 1932, he served as a Soviet delegate to the Congrès Internationaux d'Architecture Moderne (CIAM).

=== Career in 1930s ===
Like other avant-garde artists with limited practical experience, Ginzburg fell out of favor in 1932, when the state assumed control of the architectural profession and redirected it towards eclectic, revivalist stalinist architecture. The demotion of Ginzburg and other constructivists was a gradual process that continued into the late 1930s. He never returned to professional practice in Moscow or Leningrad, but continued to work in Crimea and Central Asia and maintained his own architectural workshop until his death. His books Housing (Zhlishche/Жилище) and Industrialization of Housing Construction (Индустриализация жилищного строительства) were published in 1934 and 1937 respectively. From 1934 onward, Ginzburg served as editor of the encyclopedic History of Architecture.

In the early 1930s, Ginzburg participated in the planning of Crimean coast and designed several resort hotels and sanatoriums, only one of which was built, in Kislovodsk between 1935 and 1937. His workshop was also commissioned by the Ministry of Railways to design a series of standardized station buildings for Central Asian and Siberian railways. These projects, published in the late 1930s, were less radical than his avant-garde word of the 1920s but remained distinctly modernist in style.

In the 1940s, Ginzburg prepared a reconstruction plan for postwar Sevastopol, which was never realized, and designed two resort buildings that were completed after his death in Kislovodsk and Oreanda.

== Legacy ==
Isometric drawing of The Narkomfin building.

His most famous work, the Narkomfin Building, was left without maintenance for decades and was placed on the UNESCO's list of endangered list. Earlier proposals to convert Dom Narkomfin into a hotel (designed by Ginzburg's grandson) were blocked due to legal uncertainty regarding the site's status. By 2019, Dom Narkomfin was undergoing a careful restoration aimed at returning the building as closely as possible to its original condition. The restoration was completed in 2020, and the building resumed its function as a private residential complex.

Dom Narkomfin suffered extensive vandalism over the years. Former Moscow mayor Yuri Luzhkov, speaking at the opening of the Novinsky Passage shopping centre, remarked: "What a joy that such wonderful shopping centres appear in our city, not like this garbage", referring to the Narkomfin Building.

The Narkomfin Building has been the subject of Victor Buchli's Archaeology of Socialism, a study of Soviet material culture that traces the building's history from early utopian ideals through the Stalinist period to its ruined state in the 1990s.

== See also ==
- Constructivist architecture
- Le Corbusier
- Joseph Karakis
- El Lissitzky
- Konstantin Melnikov
- Hannes Meyer
- Vladimir Tatlin
- Bruno Taut
- Alexander Vesnin

== Sources ==
- Berkovich, Gary. Reclaiming a History. Jewish Architects in Imperial Russia and the USSR. Volume 2. Soviet Avant-garde: 1917–1933. Weimar und Rostock: Grunberg Verlag. 2021. P. 15. ISBN 978-3-933713-63-6
- Ginés Garrido: Moisei Gínzburg. Escritos 1923–1930. Madrid: El Croquis editorial 2007 ISBN 978-84-88386-43-4
- Russian: Ginzburg's railroad designs – И.Г.Явейн, "Проектирование железнодорожных вокзалов", М, 1938
- Historia de la Arquitectura Moderna, Leonardo Benévolo, Editorial Gustavo Gili, S.A., 1996 ISBN 84-252-1641-9
- Ciudad rusa y ciudad soviética, Vieri Quilici, Editorial Gustavo Gili, S.A., 1978 ISBN 84-252-0738-X
- Regional and City Planning in the Soviet Union, H. Blumenfeld, 1942
- La Montaña Mágica, Thomas Mann
