= Karo Halabyan =

Soviet architect (1897–1959)

- Born: 26 July 1897; Elisabethpol, Russian Empire (modern-day Ganja, Azerbaijan)
- Died: 5 January 1959 (aged 61); Moscow, Russian SFSR, Soviet Union
- Resting place: Novodevichy Cemetery, Moscow
- Occupation: Architect
- Spouse: Lyudmila Tselikovskaya
- Children: Aleksandr Alabyan

Karo Semyonovich Halabyan (Russian: Каро Семёнович Алабян; Armenian: Կարո Հալաբյան; 26 July 1897 – 5 January 1959) was a Soviet Armenian architect. He earned the title of emeritus art worker of the Armenian SSR (1940).

== Biography ==
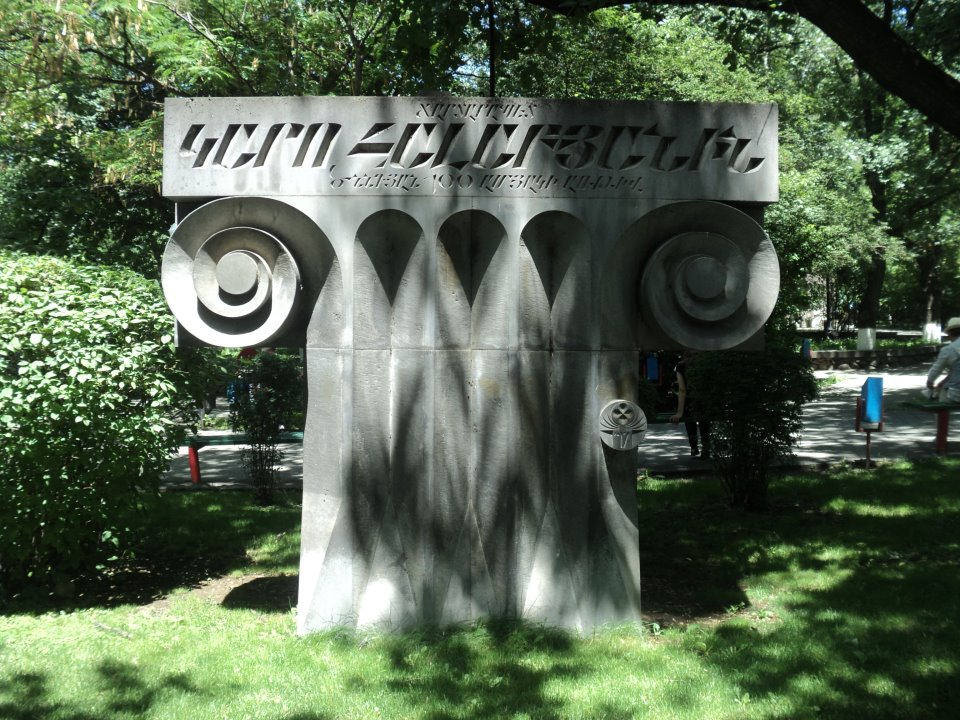
Monument to the 100th anniversary of Karo Halabyan, Yerevan

Halabyan graduated from Nersisian School in Tiflis in 1917 and from the Moscow School of Painting, Sculpture and Architecture in 1929. After 1932, he worked in Moscow. He led the project to reconstruct Volgograd in 1943.

In 1936, he was elected as an honorary correspondent member of the Royal Institute of British Architects. Halabyan held the prestigious title of chief architect of Moscow.

Between 1932 and 1950 Halabyan served as a secretary of the Union of Architects of the Soviet Union. From 1937 to 1950 he was the deputy of the Supreme Soviet of the union. He was vice president and later president of the USSR Academy of Architecture.

In 1955, he designed the main terminal building of the Port of Sochi (Russia).

Halabyan died on 5 January, 1959 in Moscow, and was buried at Novodevichy Cemetery.

== See also ==
- Nersisian School
