= Relay race on the Garden Ring =

1947 painting by Aleksandr Deyneka

- Artist: Aleksandr Deyneka
- Year: 1947
- Type: Oil on canvas
- Dimensions: 199 cm × 299 cm (78 in × 118 in)
- Location: Tretyakov Gallery, Moscow

Relay race on the Garden Ring (Russian: Эстафета, often referred to in art history literature as Relay Race on Ring B; at some exhibitions, the painting was displayed under the title Relay Race on the Garden Ring) is one of the most famous paintings by Soviet artist Aleksandr Deyneka, created in 1947. Deyneka himself wrote that he was inspired to create the painting by the track and field relay race that took place along the Garden Ring (Ring B) in Moscow in May of the same year. The artist also indicated the exact location of the action — the Garden Ring, near Tchaikovsky Street, where he himself lived at the time. According to the assumptions of several art historians, Deyneka included a self-portrait in the painting but depicted himself as he appeared in photographs from the 1930s — 15 years earlier. In the second half of the 1940s, Relay Race on Ring B reinforced Aleksandr Deyneka's reputation as one of the leading Soviet painters and interpreters of the theme of sport. The painting is currently on permanent display at the State Tretyakov Gallery.

The painting was presented at numerous All-Union, All-Russian, and international exhibitions. At the 1958 World Exhibition in Brussels, Aleksandr Deyneka was awarded the exhibition's gold medal for this work and other pieces presented there, including the panel of the Soviet pavilion For Peace and the paintings The Defence of Petrograd and The Outskirts of Moscow, 1941.

The painting Relay Race on Ring B attracted the interest of Soviet and contemporary Russian art historians, including Vladimir Sysoev, an academician of the Russian Academy of Arts and candidate of art history; Peter Cheryomushkin, a candidate of art history; Evgeny Shorokhov, a doctor of pedagogical sciences and member of the Union of Artists of Russia; and Nina Vatolina, a poster artist and writer. Mike O'Mahony, Doctor of Philosophy and Professor at the University of Bristol, analyzes the canvas in detail in his book Sport in the USSR: Physical Culture — Visual Culture (2010).

== The plot and some interpretation features ==
Aleksandr Deyneka specified in his articles the exact location depicted in the painting — the Garden Ring, near Tchaikovsky Street. The artist portrayed three pairs of athletes (three young men and three women). Behind them lies an empty Garden Ring. British art historian and PhD Mike O'Mahony suggested that the six figures represent the only participants in this stage of the race and are the best representatives of their teams. The composition centers around a white line on the tarmac, marking the finish of one stage and the start of the next. The athletes either approach or move away from this line. Deyneka's depiction shows the women literally passing the baton to the men, who will run the next leg of the relay. The movement in the painting follows a diagonal trajectory, which, according to Evgeny Shorokhov, Doctor of Pedagogical Sciences and member of the Union of Artists of Russia, enhances the painting's dynamism.

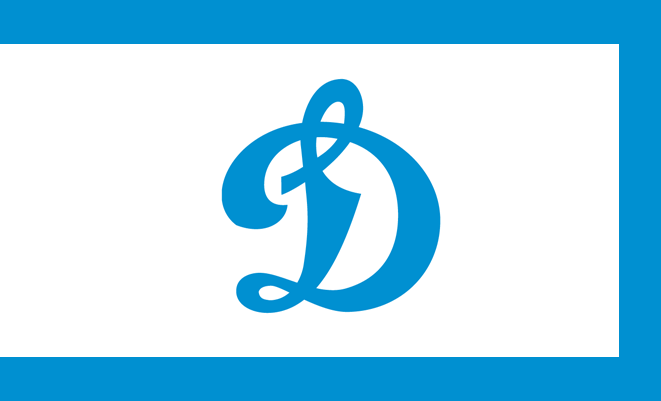
Flag of the Dinamo Sports Club in 1923

The artist positioned the spectators of the athletics relay on the right front side of the painting. Among the six distinguishable figures, three are women, two are men, and one is a boy. Two of the women are dressed elegantly, while the girl in the foreground wears fashionable shoes. The man in the background on the right is dressed in a tracksuit, suggesting he is an athlete. The letters USSR on his chest, according to British art historian Mike O'Mahony, identify him as a high-level athlete, likely someone who traveled abroad for competitions. The boy stands closest to the runners, which, O'Mahony suggests, reflects the artist's intent to show the boy's aspiration to join the athletes. Another figure in this group, positioned further away from the viewer, is presumed to be a self-portrait of the artist. O'Mahony highlights the confident posture and well-defined profile of this character. By depicting himself among the characters in the scene, the artist, according to Vladimir Sysoev, candidate of art history, aimed to convey that he was "in the thick of everyday reality, among his favorite heroes”. Aleksandr Deyneka had previously promoted physical culture through self-portraits. In 1947, however, he was over 40 years old, and his physical condition left much to be desired. Several art historians have suggested that Deyneka chose to represent himself as he appeared in photographs from the 1930s — 15 years earlier. The following year, Deyneka painted a full-length self-portrait portraying himself as an athlete. In this work, the artist's head is combined with the body of a younger model.

Deyneka incorporated architectural elements into the painting, including three multi-story buildings that serve as dominant features and form the compositional framework. Compared to the artist's pre-war works, this canvas is notable for its meticulous attention to detail. In the foreground, the artist depicts cracks in the asphalt, a trolleybus stopped at the edge of the street, flags, and other symbols of the Dynamo Sports Club, such as the blue letter D on a white background.

== The painting's history and destination ==
=== Relay race along the Garden Ring and Aleksandr Deyneka ===
In the second half of the 1940s, significant changes occurred in the artist's life. In March 1945, he was appointed Director of the newly established Moscow Institute of Applied and Decorative Arts, while simultaneously managing administrative work in the faculty of mural painting. In April 1947, Aleksandr Deyneka was also appointed head of the department of decorative sculpture at the same institution. During this period, he continued working on major state commissions. Notably, he was tasked with creating a series of paintings under the theme Creators of Industrial Giants. At the same time, Deyneka began producing drawings and sketches for decorative and applied art objects, including dishes, children's toys, screens, decorative panels, vases, stained glass, and even door handles. This shift in focus inevitably took time away from his easel painting.

The artist created the painting Relay Race on Ring B after returning from a trip to Vienna, where he participated in the Exhibition of Works by Masters of Soviet Art (which ran from February 20 to March 16, with Deyneka returning to the USSR on April 9). In 1947, he lived in the House of the People's Commissar of the Narkomfin building (at 25 Tchaikovsky Street), near where the traditional track and field relay race on the Garden Ring took place. Deyneka wrote that he was inspired to create the painting Relay Race on Ring B by the track and field relay race that occurred along the Garden Ring (Ring B) in May 1947. The artist's intention was to portray a multitude of figures set within a real, recognizable urban environment.

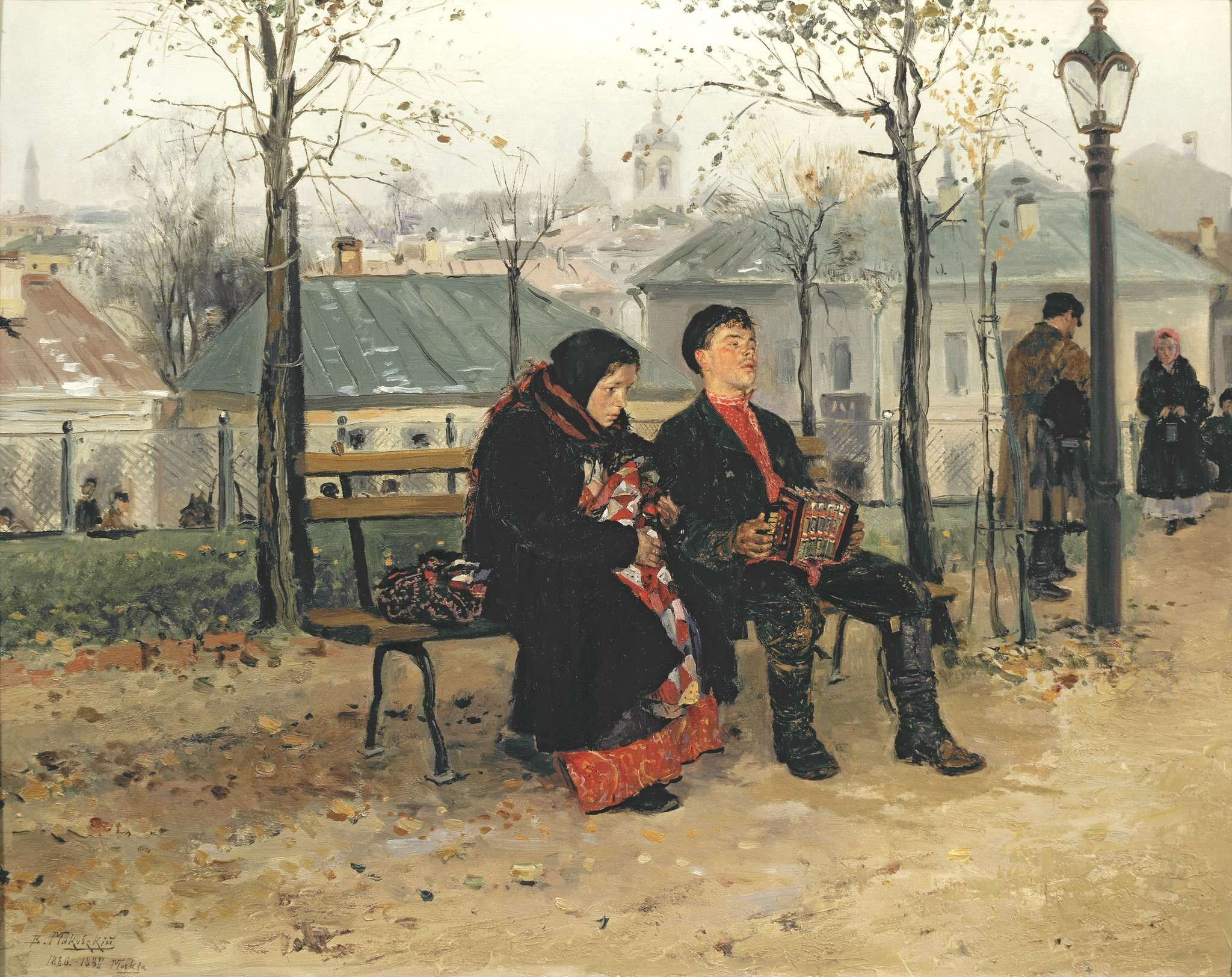
Vladimir Makovsky. On the Boulevard (1886–1887, Tretyakov Gallery)

The artist observed the race firsthand. Military pilot, journalist, and writer Ivan Rakhillo, in his book Silver Lane, described in detail Aleksandr Deyneka's impressions of the track and field relay on the Garden Ring. He wrote that he went for a walk with Deyneka that morning. The streets were decorated with sports flags in honor of the relay. The friends began a conversation about how Moscow was changing: asphalted highways replacing shady boulevards lined with century-old oaks and lindens, where the hooves of horses, the wheels of wagons, and bogies once clattered on the uneven cobblestones, and where drunken craftsmen, indifferent and bored, loitered. Both recalled Vladimir Makovsky's painting On Moscow Boulevard. Rakhillo recounted that during the race, a blonde-haired girl in a blue T-shirt was the first to reach the set point and passed the baton to a young man “with strangely short legs for a runner”. He dropped it on the asphalt, and a tanned young man wearing the uniform of the Burevestnik society took the lead. Nevertheless, the young man with short legs caught up and far outstripped his competitors to the applause and cheers of the admiring crowd.

Rakhillo described his observations of Deyneka during the competition: “His eyes are shining. You can expect him to rush off the start any moment!” Fascinated by the events of the athletics race, Rakhillo and the artist did not notice the onset of dusk. The writer noted that by the end of the day, they were both as tired “as if they had actually taken part in the run”. Many years later, upon seeing the painting Relay Race on Ring B at a vernissage, Rakhillo recalled the day of the event. He observed that not everything in the painting corresponded to the actual events: “The clouds, the flags, the runners — everything is somewhat different. The artist built the composition his own way.” However, Deyneka succeeded in retaining the vivid images of the competition's participants in his memory, including the boy with short legs, ahead of his rivals in the race. The writer also pointed out Deyneka's self-portrait in the painting: “In the picture, in the crowd, I recognized Deyneka himself, as he was in those years—young, tanned, with a ‘boxer-style’ haircut, in an unbuttoned sports shirt, with a taut stomach. He stands thoughtful and unsmiling”.

Deyneka made many sketches, but the idea of creating a large painting did not come to him immediately. The artist later noted that he worked on the painting "with special pleasure". He wrote about his canvas: “This event takes place in Moscow. And for the first time for me, the theme of sport is resolved among the architecture of Moscow. This is quite a specific place — the Garden Ring, near Tchaikovsky Street. I painted this picture in 1947. Moscow has changed so much over the years! There were high-rise buildings, new houses. And my painting became somewhat historical”.

The first running of the Relay Race along the Garden Ring was organized on May 2, 1922, by the Main School of Physical Education of Workers. However, after 1924, the organizers moved the event to Leningrad. In 1927, the relay race was revived by the newspaper Vechernyaya Moskva and its reporter German Kolodny. Not only did Kolodny persuade the editor-in-chief to resume the race, but he also used his own money to buy a silver chest with inlay from an antique shop, which became the passing prize. The competition was held annually, with variations in the route, course length, and number of participants. The races were also held in the 1930s. Some sources claim that they were resumed after the World War II, while other publications suggest that the relay race continued even during the war years.

External images
- | Relay race along the Garden Ring in 1943
- | Relay race along the Garden Ring in 1946

In 1947, Air Force Colonel-General Mikhail Gromov served as the chief judge of the Track and Field Relay along the Garden Ring. The most successful participants were the representatives of the Dynamo sports society, among them European champion Nikolai Karakulov, two-time European champion Evgenia Sechenova, and Alexandra Chudina, the USSR champion in track and field disciplines and winner of the USSR Cup in ball hockey.

External images
- | Alexander Deyneka. A runner with a relay baton. Drawing for the painting Relay race on the ring “B"
- | Relay race along the Garden Ring in 1946

In the collection of the Kursk Art Gallery, there are drawings for the painting Relay Race on Ring B: A Runner Girl (1947, paper, pencil, 31.3 × 20 cm, inventory number G-2795) and A Runner Girl with a Baton (1947, pencil, 31.2 × 24.4 cm, inventory number G-3568). A sketch for the painting (1947, paper, watercolor, 55 × 56 cm) is held in the collection of the Tomsk Regional Art Museum. In his dissertation for the degree of candidate of art history, V. P. Sysoev wrote that, alongside nature sketches, Deyneka drew from the possibilities of cinematography and photography in creating Relay Race on Ring B. Dozens of photographs, capturing various episodes of the competition, were used by the artist to study the technique and plastic construction of running, which allowed him to fix the poses, gestures, and movements of the runners, lasting only seconds. To this end, Deyneka also used footage from the newsreel Novosti dnya.

=== The painting is in the Tretyakov Gallery collection and at exhibitions ===
The painting Relay Race on Ring B was created in 1947. In August of the same year, Aleksandr Deyneka became a full member of the Academy of Arts of the USSR. The technique is oil painting on canvas. Its size is 199 × 299 cm, making it the largest work by Deyneka on the theme of sport in the collection of the Tretyakov Gallery. At the bottom right of the front side of the canvas are the signature and date: A. Deyneka 47. The painting is part of the collection of the State Tretyakov Gallery, with inventory number 27900. It entered the museum's collection in 1948, when it was purchased directly from the artist. Anatoly Zykov, People's Artist of the RSFSR and full member of the Russian Academy of Arts, who visited the Tretyakov Gallery as a student in 1948, recalled that he was particularly impressed by Mikhail Vrubel's Spain and Deyneka's Relay Race on Ring B. Since 2019, the painting has been on permanent display at the State Tretyakov Gallery.

The painting was repeatedly presented at the following exhibitions:

- The All-Union Art Exhibition in 1947 in Moscow;
- The exhibitions in Berlin, Dresden, and Budapest in 1949–1950;
- Deyneka's personal exhibition in 1957 in Moscow and Leningrad;
- 1958 World Exhibition in Brussels (where the artist also presented the panel of the Soviet pavilion For Peace and the paintings The Defence of Petrograd (1928) and The Outskirts of Moscow. 1941 (1941), for which he was awarded the exhibition's gold medal);
- The 1958 All-Union Exhibition in Moscow; at the 1959 exhibition in London;
- The 7th Biennale of 1963 in São Paulo;
- The 1965 exhibition in Havana;
- The artist's personal exhibition in 1966–1967 in Kursk, Kyiv, and Riga;
- The 1968 exhibition in Mexico City; at the 1969 solo exhibitions in Budapest and 1969–1970 in Moscow and Leningrad;
- The 1971 All-Union exhibition in Moscow;
- The 1978 exhibition at the Central Exhibition Hall in Moscow;
- The 1980 exhibition at the Tretyakov Gallery;
- The 1980 solo exhibition in Moscow and Leningrad; at the 1980 All-Union Exhibition in Moscow;
- The 1981-1982 exhibition in Kolomna;
- The 1982 exhibition 50 Years of the Moscow Union of Artists in Moscow;
- The 1982 All-Union Art Exhibition in Moscow; at exhibitions in Moscow in 1984, 1985, 1986–1987;
- The 1990 solo exhibition in Moscow;
- The 1993-1994 exhibition in New York; and at the 1995-1996 Berlin-Moscow and 1996 Moscow-Berlin exhibitions;
- The 2002 exhibition at the Central House of Artists;
- The 2002 exhibition in Moscow, and at the 2003-2004 exhibition in Frankfurt am Main;
- The exhibition The Age of Sport: To the 100th Anniversary of Moscow Sports at the New Tretyakovka, running from 14 September 2023 to 17 March 2024.

Another painting by Aleksandr Deineka called Relay Race was created around 1950 and is also in a private collection. The technique is oil on canvas. Its size is 199 × 299 cm.

== Opinions of art historians, cultural critics, and audiences on the painting ==
=== In Soviet art history ===
Lev Mochalov, a candidate of art history and leading researcher at the Russian Museum's Department of Newer Currents, wrote that Deyneka tried to convey movement in the painting Relay Race in such a way "that it did not create the impression of a stopped photographic frame, a random moment of life", and managed to masterfully solve this problem. He decomposed the movement into its constituent elements, "replacing the temporal sequence with a spatial one": the right pair of runners are at a certain distance from each other, the middle one is at the moment of passing the baton, and the runner in the left part has already taken it from the hands of the girl who ran up and rushed forward. In order for the viewer to perceive these separate actions as a single movement, Aleksandr Deyneka did not endow the characters of the painting with individual features but gave "variations of the same type." He achieved the emotional effect of the canvas thanks to the "acutely conveyed mood of the whole picture." Deyneka was interested "not in characters in the sense of the inner state of mind, the psychology of the heroes, but in the characteristic, manifested primarily in movement, posture, behaviour, that is, qualities, again, perceived immediately. When a person is in a state of movement, the eye catches only the outlines of his figure". Lev Mochalov wrote that even the face is perceived in this case in general outlines. It is even more difficult to penetrate into the inner world of a person. The art historian concluded: "The logic of life itself dictates and the logic of the artistic image, justifies the conventions of the visual language of the artist".

Lev Mochalov noted, analyzing the painting Relay Race, that Deyneka's painting expresses his perception of the surrounding world. The artist does not convey subtle colour nuances and does not use "the possibilities of painting to characterize the texture of different materials," but "keenly feels the general decorative structure of the painting and above all the rhythmic alternation of colours". The art historian wrote that it is not necessary to extract individual fragments from the canvas, as Aleksandr Deyneka's painting is based on the decorative juxtaposition of large colour surfaces. Just as a word extracted from a poem will lose "the energy of the poetic rhythm," so too will the individual fragments of Deyneka's painting, according to Mochalov, lose "their tension".

In her small brochure Aleksandr Alexandrovich Deyneka (1964), Soviet art historian Maria Yablonskaya characterises the painting Relay Race along Ring B as imbued with sunshine and movement and recalls in connection with it an earlier painting by the artist Expanse, stating that its content is "the preceding stage of this peaceful relay race". Poster artist and writer Nina Vatolina compared the street depicted by the artist to a wide river, and the houses around it to its banks. The three groups of figures, in her opinion, are like three dancing couples.

Academician of the Russian Academy of Arts, candidate of art history Vladimir Sysoev noted that in the 1930s Deyneka repeatedly undertook to depict mass athletic cross-country races, but he presented them in his works outside of a specific setting, as "a self-valuable plastic motif, unfolded in a conventional space". Only after a while Deyneka began to introduce elements of the landscape environment into his paintings, but depicted "in the same synthetically sharp manner as the generalised figures of running athletes". In the painting Expanse, created in 1944, according to Sysoev, the artist is already almost as concrete in the landscape as in Relay Race on the Ring B.

Vladimir Sysoev believed that Deyneka was guided not by worldly verisimilitude, but by the truth of the artistic image in his treatment of the life material for his painting. Therefore, the author, for the purpose of a clear compositional construction, somewhat modified the real image of the urban environment: moved the space of the street, introduced in the architecture of individual buildings ‘solemn representativeness’, which is better consistent with the atmosphere of the sports festival. The researcher noted that the shortcomings that art critics drew attention to after acquaintance with the painting (among them were traditionalism and narrative, associated with detailed drawing of the elements of the plot and the environment), with the passage of time recede into the background in comparison with the vitality and artistic value of the picture.

Sysoev saw a typological connection between the heroes of the painting Relay Race on Ring B and the characters of the paintings At Lunch Break in Donbass (1935), Runner (1936), Expanse (1944). He found similarities in the construction and plasticity of the figures. Deyneka transformed successfully found plastic formulas and compositional schemes, organically adapting them "to embody the changed content of the era". Compared to the earlier paintings, the figures of Relay Race on the Ring B are more voluminous and material, with light and shadow moulding of the form prevailing over the silhouette. Deyneka chose the starting phase of the runners' movement, which corresponded to this manner of depicting the figures. The athletes’ movement comes from the depths of urban space and takes place at a moderate pace, from the viewer's point of view. Nevertheless, the picture convincingly conveys "the beat of light, healthy forces of life", depicting a harmonious man, with aesthetic and moral principles embedded in his spiritual and physical appearance. Following Relay Race on the Ring B, Deyneka's paintings, according to Sysoev, lose genre definitiveness, carrying "a contradictory combination of signs of monumental-decorative stylistics and frankly easel specificity".

=== In contemporary Russian art history ===
Elena Karpova, a candidate of pedagogical sciences and associate professor of the Department of Psychological and Pedagogical Education at the Nekrasov Kostroma State University, noted that in the painting "the catchiness of colour relations, broad light, lively moving shadows on the asphalt, fluttering highlights create a joyful feeling", and "delicate shades of colour are imbued with the energy of movement". In her opinion, the connection of large spatial plans in the painting was due to the artist's desire to show the inner world of the characters.

Elena Erokhina, a senior lecturer at Kursk State University, wrote in her article Graphic Methods of Depicting the Human Figure in A. A. Deyneka's Works Devoted to Sports (2019) that in the painting Relay Race Deyneka draws the viewer's attention to the panorama of the sports festival. He depicted himself in the mass of people watching the competition. The face of the character is concentrated, "he carefully and excitedly looks into the prospect of the Motherland — in the fate of the young generation". The researcher noted the effectiveness of the colour solution, in which "deep colours, fluttering highlights create a positive feeling". She saw on the canvas "the energy of movement" and noted that ‘the gentle shades of the city landscape are organically connected with the state of athletes".

Ksenia Tolokonnikova, director of the People and Faith in the USSR Museum at the Department of Church History at the Moscow Theological Academy and the Church of St. Sergius of Radonezh in Krapivniki, considered the painting Relay Race to be quite traditional in Aleksandr Deyneka's work. The author, from her point of view, sacrificed dynamism in order to more carefully work out the volumes, but the canvas "as generously exudes vibes of optimism as earlier sports works of the artist". According to Elena Voronovich, a researcher at the Department of Painting of the First Half of the 20th Century of the Tretyakov Gallery, due to the abundance of carefully painted details in the painting Relay Race on the Ring B loses the strength of images, and the style of socialist realism blurs the individual creative handwriting of the artist.

Professor Evgeny Shorokhov compared the artist's paintings Expanse and Relay Race. In his opinion, the sense of dynamic composition in both paintings is created by showing each figure in a particular phase of movement. The rhythmic alternation of its phases creates the illusion of one movement turning into another. This rhythm gives a sense of the reality of movement in the painting. The rhythm in the painting Expanse is characterised by a complex structure. The movement of the sportswomen begins at the bottom, continues from the river up to the high bank, initially the girls run directly towards the viewer, and then parallel to the picture plane. In Relay Race, on the other hand, the movement is carried out diagonally. This increases its dynamism.

Elena Zimenko, Head of the Isomaterials Sector in the Department of Rare Books and Manuscripts at Moscow State University, wrote in her article Looking from London: An Exhibition of Russian and Soviet Painting through the Eyes of the British from the first volume of the collection The Other in Literature and Culture that British visitors to the exhibition acknowledged the undisputed skill of Aleksandr Deyneka, but were puzzled as to how The Defence of Petrograd – from their point of view a truly great painting – and Relay Race – a “vulgar commonplace” – could have been painted by the same artist. The audience concluded, “You killed Deyneka!” (such a phrase appeared in the exhibition's comment book). “The artist has resigned himself to ideological attitudes,” his work was deformed by them. According to Zimenko, it was not difficult for the Londoners to detect this deformation: the paintings in the exhibition were placed side by side (in catalogue Nos. 97 and 98). The colours of the earlier painting are poor, the people in the composition are “closed into a monolith,” the artist's attention is focused on creating a unified rhythm and embossed forms. Relay Race is naturalistic and “depicts the triumph of healthy flesh: powerful, strong, ruddy gymnasts pass the relay race against the background of summer bright and festive Moscow”.

Candidate of Art History Peter Cheryomushkin in his book Deyneka. Romantic Socialist Realism (2021) noted that the painting is a vivid indicator of how the artist gradually changes his signature style, which was criticized for formalism. From the point of view of the author of the book, Deyneka tried to approach the stylistics of Ivan Pyryev's film Cossacks of the Kuban, which dominated the Soviet art of the late 1940s–1950s. Following Vladimir Sysoev, he noted that many art critics found a number of shortcomings in the film Relay Race, including: traditionalism, narrative, excessive detailing of certain elements of both the plot and the environment. Cheryomushkin was in agreement with Sysoev that these problems eventually moved to the background level, and in the center of attention of viewers were “life and artistic value” and optimism of the canvas.

Cheryomushkin also pointed out that in the reproduction of the painting it is extremely difficult to understand in which specific place the race takes place. Only upon close examination of the painting itself can it be established that the place of action is Novy Arbat, “or rather the tunnel beneath it”. The Novy Arbat tunnel, however, was cut only in the 1950s, that is, after the painting was created. The traffic goes from the Ministry of Foreign Affairs of the USSR (built in 1948–1953) and the metro station Smolenskaya (opened in 1953). Among the buildings depicted on the canvas one can recognize the Navy dwelling house decorated with turrets and columns, as well as the now lost building demolished when Kalinin Avenue was formed. On the opposite side one can notice the building of Shcherbatov apartment house, built in 1912.

Buildings that Peter Cheryomushkin correlates with the painting Relay Race on the Garden Ring

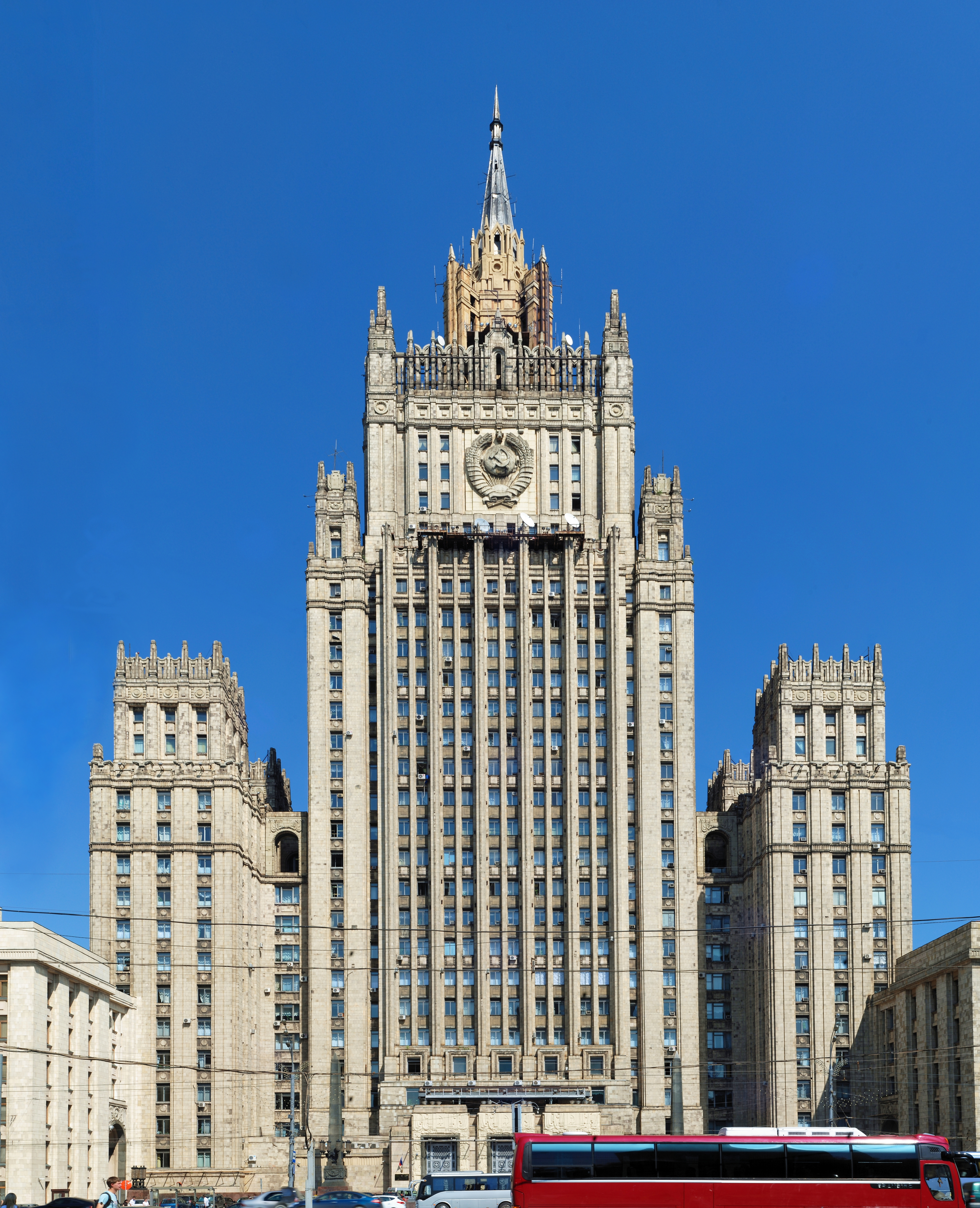
Ministry of Foreign Affairs of Russia

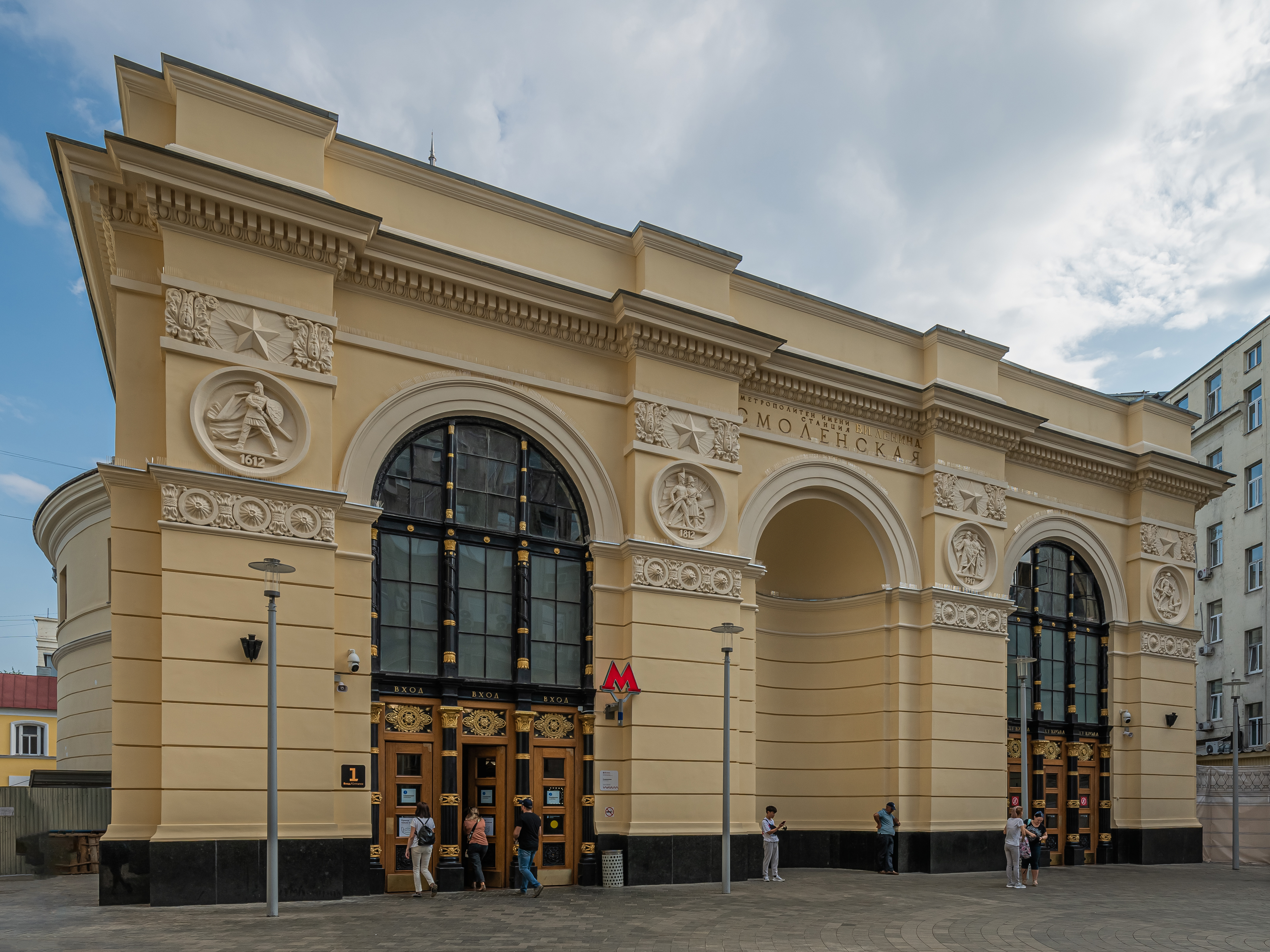
Smolenskaya Metro station

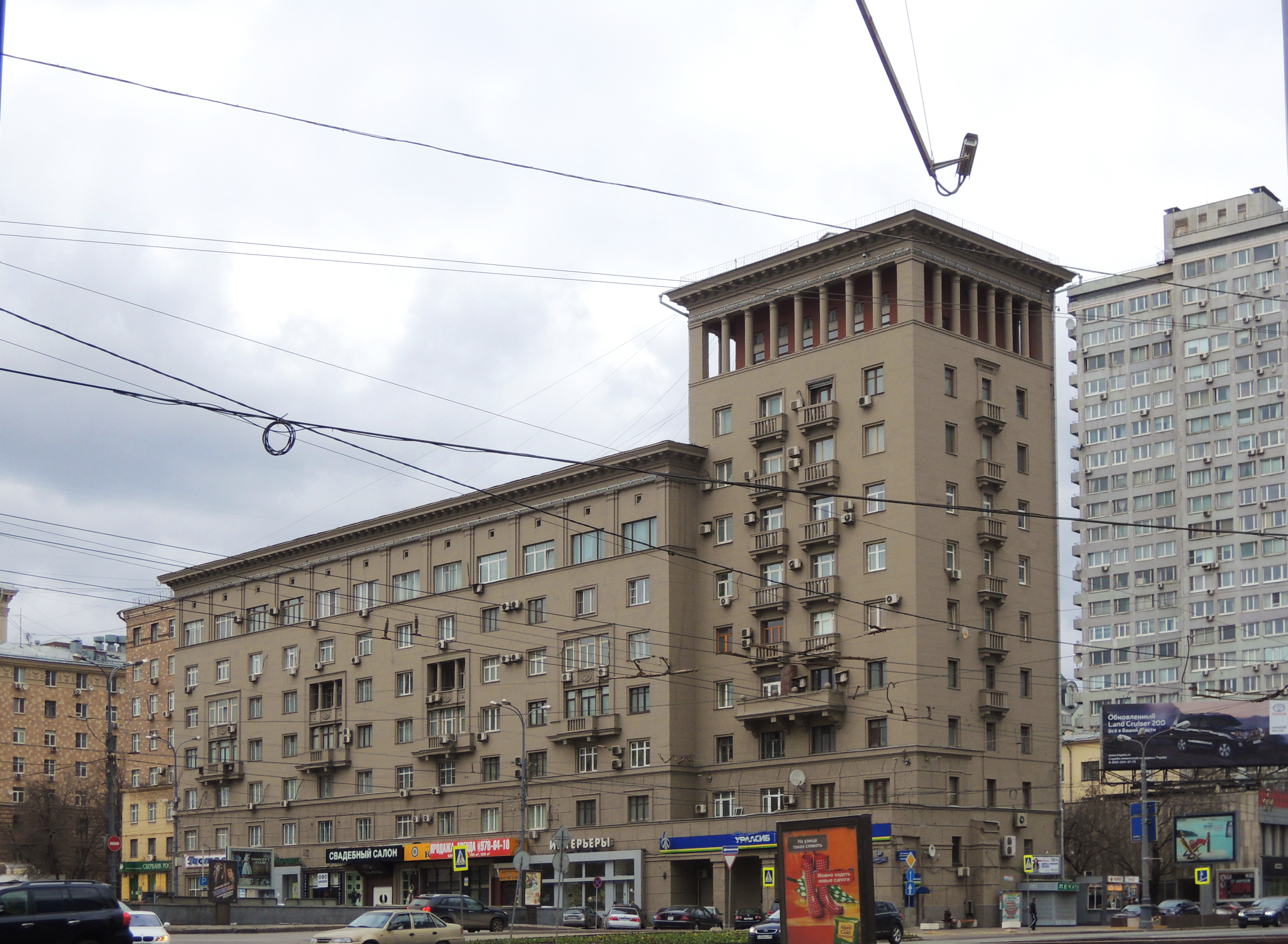
Building 12 on Novinsky Boulevard in Moscow, depicted in the painting by Aleksandr Deyneka, is a dwelling house of the Navy (1937–1939, architects Lev Talalai and Andrei Dzerzhkovich).

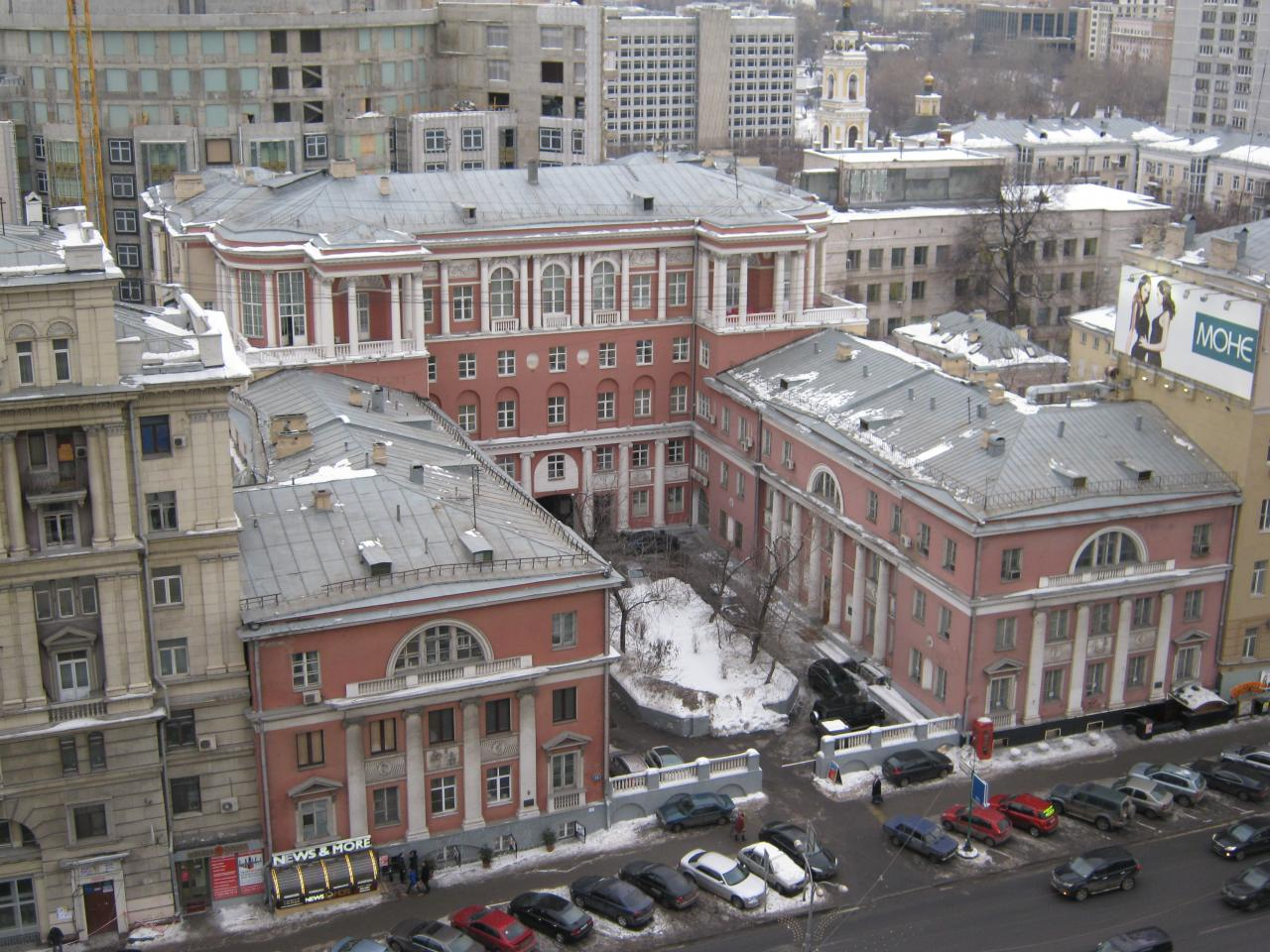
Shcherbatov apartment house, architect Aleksandr Tamanyan, 1911–1913.

=== In foreign art history ===
Mike O'Mahony, Ph.D., at that time professor of contemporary art at the University of Southampton's Winchester School of Art and the Courtauld Institute of Art, wrote in his book Sport in the USSR. Physical Culture — Visual Culture (2010) that Relay Race around the ‘B’ Ring was painted on a canvas of the same dimensions as Deyneka's canvas Expanse, created in 1944. Relay, however, moves the race from the countryside (as in Razdolye) to Moscow. Unlike Razdolye, Relay on the Ring B shows a competition rather than a mass sporting event. In the painting Expanse it was the latter that symbolized the power of the Soviet Union; in Relay Race the artist, on the contrary, emphasizes the small number of athletes: there are only three pairs of them. In contrast to Razdolye, young men are also depicted here. Girls pass the baton to them. In the context of that time, according to O'Mahony, this can be seen as men reclaiming for themselves those professions and social roles that had been relegated to women during the war. The British art historian explains the fact that the artist depicted himself in the painting Relay on the B-ring as a transfer of a symbolic baton from the older to the younger generation.

In his relay race's representation, Deyneka emphasized the connection between physical education and the country's post-war reconstruction. The young athletes, according to O'Mahony, are “projected onto the buildings” depicted on the canvas — the remoteness of each of them corresponds exactly to the place of this or that runner in the relay, that is, “sporting successes and architectural achievements merge into one”. A British art historian wrote that Relay on the Ring ‘B’ strengthened Aleksandr Deyneka's reputation as one of the leading Soviet painters —interpreters of the theme of sport in the second half of the 1940s.

== The painting in education and culture ==
Doctor of Pedagogical Sciences Svetlana Aranova offers junior schoolchildren a work on Aleksandr Deyneka's painting Relay Race in the textbook Fine Arts for 1st grade. Doctor of Philology Vladimir Lopatin and his wife Lyudmila Lopatina used a black-and-white reproduction of the painting in the Illustrated Explanatory Dictionary of the Modern Russian Language published in 2007 to explain the meaning of the word Peregat. Soviet and then British art historian Igor Golomshtok, in his book Totalitarian Art (1994), published a selection of black-and-white reproductions of works of fine art and architecture of Italy, Germany, and the USSR from the 1920s–1950s for the reader's independent comparison. An undated painting by an unknown Italian artist, awarded by the city of Cremona and depicting athletes resting after a competition (No. 93), is set against Relay Race on the B Ring (No. 94 in the list of illustrations).

The painting was presented on Soviet postcards in different years. One such postcard (black and white) was published in 1948. On the back was the text: “All-Union Art Exhibition 1947 by artist A. A. Deyneka Relay Race”. There was also a marking for filling. In 1978, the canvas was reproduced on a color postcard, one of the copies of which is in the collection of the State Museum of Sport. The authors of the annotation in the Internet catalog of the Ministry of Culture of the Russian Federation emphasize that the painting and, accordingly, the postcard depict the transmission of a mixed relay race (men and women running together). On the back of the postcard, the text reads: “A. A. Deyneka (1899–1969). Relay Race on the Ring B, 1947, canvas, oil. 198 × 297. State Tretyakov Gallery”. Part of this text is duplicated in two more languages. In 2018, another postcard was published in the series Moscow in Works of Painting and Graphics. The postcard was colored, stamped, and one-sided.

== Bibliography ==
=== Sources ===
- Rakhilo, I. S. (1974). "Дейнека". Серебряный переулок [Silver Lane] (in Russian). М.: Московский рабочий. pp. 448–490.

=== Researches and non-fiction ===
- Vatolina, N. N. (1983). Пейзажи Москвы. Несколько рассказов о Москве и творчестве художников, запечатлевших её древний и сегодняшний облик [Landscapes of Moscow. A Few Stories about Moscow and the Works of Artists Who Captured Its Ancient and Contemporary Appearance] (in Russian). М.: Советский художник. p. 344.
- Voronovich, Е. V. (2017). Александр Дейнека [Aleksander Deineka]. Художник в Третьяковской галерее (in Russian). М.: Третьяковская галерея. p. 48.
- Golomshtok, I. N. (1994). Тоталитарное искусство [Totalitarian Art] (in Russian). М.: Галарт. p. 296. ISBN 5-2690-0712-6.
- Дейнека. Живопись [Deineka. Painting] (in Russian). М.: Издательская программа «Интерроса». 2010. p. 496. ISBN 978-5-9149-1020-1.
- Дейнека. Графика [Deineka. Graphics] (in Russian). М.: Издательская программа «Интерроса». 2009. p. 496. ISBN 978-5-914-91002-7.
- Dolgopolov, I. V. (1988). "Александр Дейнека". Мастера и шедевры [Maters and Masterpieces] (in Russian). Vol. III. М.: Изобразительное искусство. pp. 201–282.
- Erokhina, Е. V. (2019). "Графические приёмы изображения фигуры человека в произведениях А. А. Дейнеки, посвящённых спорту. Влияние творчества художника на создание современной иллюстрации". Художник в современном мире: от профессионального образования — к творчеству. Материалы международной научной конференции [Artist in the Modern World: From Professional Education to Creativity. Materials from the International Scientific Conference] (in Russian). Курск: ООО «Мечта». pp. 52–55. ISBN 978-5-9891-6135-5.
- Zimenko, Е. V. (2019). "«Глядя из Лондона»: выставка русской и советской живописи глазами англичан". Другой в литературе и культуре. Сборник научных работ [The Other in Literature and Culture: A Collection of Scholarly Works]. Научное приложение (in Russian). Vol. 1. М.: Новое литературное обозрение. pp. 304–317. ISBN 978-5-4448-0972-3.
- Karpova, Е. М. (2013). "Отражение физической культуры человека в изобразительном искусстве А. А. Дейнеки" [The Reflection of Human Physical Culture in the Visual Art of A. A. Deineka]. Вестник Московского Государственного Университета Печати (in Russian) (6). Вестник Московского государственного университета печати имени Ивана Фёдорова: Журнал: 254–259. ISSN 2409-6652.
- O'Mahony, M (2010). Спорт в СССР. Физическая культура — визуальная культура [Sport in the USSR: Physical Culture — Visual Culture] (in Russian). М.: Новое литературное обозрение. p. 304. ISBN 978-5-8679-3815-4.
- Mochalov, L. V. (1963). Художник, картина, зритель. Беседы о живописи [Artist, Painting, Viewer: Conversations About Painting] (in Russian). Л.: Художник РСФСР.
- Sysoyev, V. P. (2010). "Послевоенный период". Александр Дейнека [Aleksander Deineka]. Малая серия искусств (in Russian). М.: Арт-Родник. pp. 81–93. ISBN 978-5-4040-0007-8.
- Sysoyev, V. P. (1989). Александр Дейнека: монография: в 2 т. [Alexander Deineka: Monograph in two volumes] (in Russian). Vol. 1. М.: Изобразительное искусство.
- Sysoyev, V. P. (1972). Творчество Александра Дейнеки. Автореферат диссертации на соискание учёной степени кандидата искусствоведения [The Work of Alexander Deineka: Abstract of a Dissertation for the Degree of Candidate of Art History] (in Russian). М.: Издательство Академии художеств СССР. p. 21.
- Cheryomushkin, P. G. (2021). "Создание и разгром МИПИДИ". Дейнека. Романтик соцреализма [Deineka: A Romantic of Socialist Realism] (in Russian). М.: Молодая гвардия. pp. 222–240. ISBN 978-5-2350-4482-1.
- Shorokhov, E. V. (2012). О ритме в композиции [On Rhythm in Composition] (in Russian). Vol. 8. О ритме в композиции Вопросы истории, теории и методики преподавания изобразительного искусства: Межвузовский сборник научных трудов. pp. 64–90. ISBN 978-5-457-67683-1.
- Yablonskaya, M. N. (1964). Александр Александрович Дейнека [Aleksander Aleksandrovich Deineka]. Народная библиотечка по искусству (in Russian). Л.: Художник РСФСР. p. 40.

=== Mass media ===
- Rayevskaya M., Guschin N. (2017). Погоня за ларцом. 90 лет назад состоялась первая эстафета на призы "ВМ" [The Chase for the Chest: 90 Years Ago, the First Relay Race for the "VM" Prizes Took Place] (in Russian). Вечерняя Москва: Газета. ISSN 1025-1200.
- Korolyova S. A., Baragamyan А. А. (2011). Александр Александрович Дейнека [Aleksander Aleksandrovich Deineka]. Великие художники (in Russian). М.: Директ-Медиа, Комсомольская правда. p. 48. ISBN 978-5-7475-0124-9.
- Tolokonnikova, К. А. (2011). Дейнека [Deineka]. 50 художников. Шедевры русской живописи (in Russian). Vol. 56. М.: De Agostini. p. 32. ISBN 978-5-9149-1020-1.

=== Catalogs and Dictionaries ===
- Государственная Третьяковская галерея — каталог собрания [The State Tretyakov Gallery: Catalogue of the Collection] (in Russian). Vol. 6: Живопись первой половины XX века, книга 1, А–И. М.: Сканрус. 2009. p. 492. ISBN 978-5-9322-1137-3.
- Lopatin V. V., Lopatina L. E. (2007). "Перегнать". Иллюстрированный толковый словарь современного русского языка [Illustrated Explanatory Dictionary of Modern Russian Language] (in Russian). М.: Эксмо. p. 493. ISBN 978-5-6992-2388-6.

=== Textbooks ===
- Aranova, S. A. (2014). "Вопросы и задания к разделу". Изобразительное искусство. 1 класс. Учебник [Visual Arts. Grade 1. Textbook] (in Russian). М.: Дрофа. pp. 73–75. ISBN 978-5-3581-7410-8.
