= Expanse =

Expanse or The Expanse may refer to:

== Media and entertainment ==
=== The Expanse franchise ===
- The Expanse (novel series), a series of science fiction novels by James S. A. Corey
- The Expanse (TV series), a television adaptation of the novel series
- The Expanse: A Telltale Series, a video game prequel to the TV series

=== Star Trek franchise ===
- "The Expanse" (Star Trek: Enterprise episode), the 26th episode of the second season of the TV series Star Trek: Enterprise
- The Expanse (Star Trek novel), the novelization of the episode
- The Expanse (Star Trek location), the Delphic Expanse, a region of space in the Star Trek universe

== Other uses ==
- Expanse, Saskatchewan, an unincorporated area in Saskatchewan, Canada
- Expanse (painting), a 1944 painting by Aleksandr Deyneka

== See also ==
- Expansion (disambiguation)
