= Social condenser =

Social Condenser
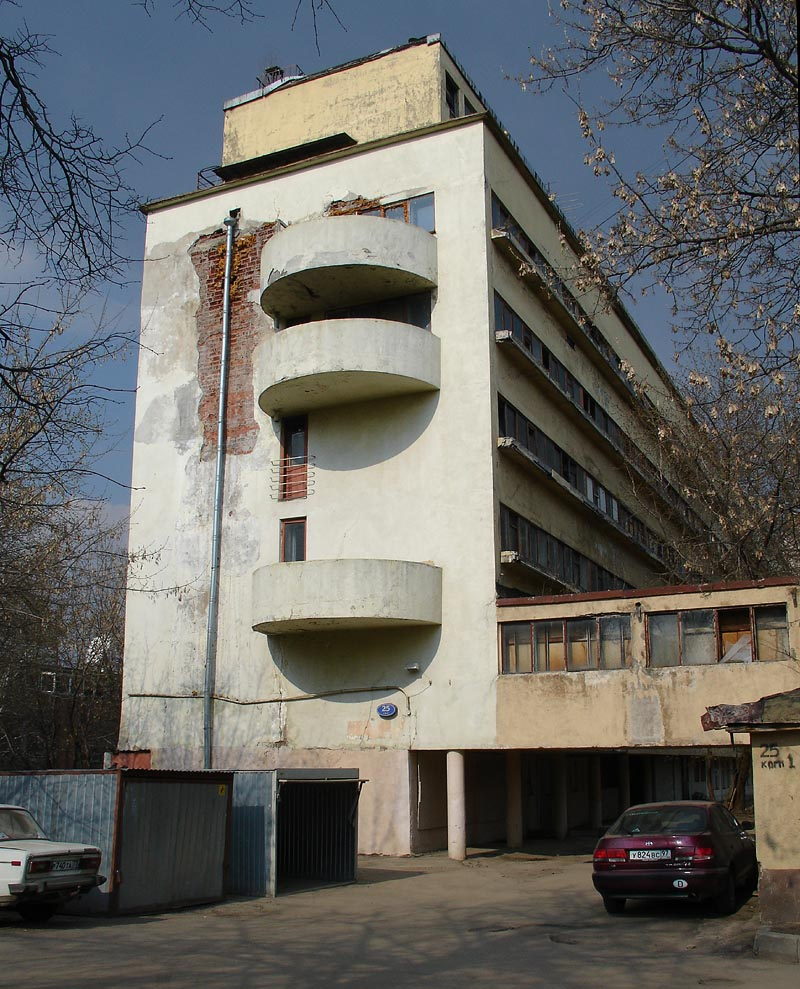

Practice information
- Founders: Moisei Ginzburg, OSA Group
- Founded: 1927
- Affiliations: Soviet Constructivism

Inspired by the ideologies of Soviet Constructivist theory, the social condenser (Russian: социальный конденсатор) is an architectural form defined by its influence over spatial dynamics. In the opening speech of the inaugural OSA Group conference in 1928, Moisei Ginzburg claimed that "the principal objective of constructivism... is the definition of the Social Condenser of the age." The single building most associated with the idea is the Narkomfin Building in Moscow, for which construction began in 1928 and finished in 1932.

Central to the idea of the social condenser is the premise that architecture has the ability to influence social behaviour. The primary objective of the social condenser was to affect the design of public spaces, with a view to deconstructing perceived social hierarchies in an effort to create socially equitable spaces.

In the OMA book Content (2004), a social condenser is described as a "Programmatic layering upon vacant terrain to encourage dynamic coexistence of activities and to generate through their interference, unprecedented events."

Through their inherent “interference”, Lenin hoped that the Social Condensers would aid in the emergence and advancement of a higher Soviet consciousness which valued collective interaction over all else. Largely driven by a desire to differentiate post-revolutionary Russia from pre-revolutionary Russia, the Social Condenser style was in the vanguard of new Soviet thought and reflected the Leninist desire to do away with individualised experiences and behaviours. The Constructivist theory that was dictating much of the discourse in Soviet Russia helped to propel this agenda of ideological reform and reinvention, ultimately consolidating the Social Condenser’s position as an architectural allegory for socialist ideals.

== Characteristics ==
The design of the Social Condenser is defined by a commitment to collectivist forms and features which conduce to social interaction and communal activity. As such, the Social Condensers of past and present exhibit several distinctive attributes which reflect this commitment and allow for their identification amongst the proliferation of other architectural forms throughout history. Essentially, the Social Condenser advocated for the abolition of private amenities, offering communal facilities in their place. For example, Moisei Ginzburg's Narkomfin building incorporated "a communal canteen, gymnasium, crèche and library" in the place of individualised architectural features and services which perpetuate the notion of private life.

However, these characteristics of the Social Condenser presented themselves retrospectively, that is, their constructivist designers did not actively endeavour to incorporate certain structural and stylistic features but rather allowed architectural morphology and a commitment to socialist objectives to guide them. This reflects the constructivist alignment with postmodern indeterminacy. Despite this ideological promulgation of indeterminate architecture, the Social Condenser did demonstrate some codified spatial features including interplay between centripetal and centrifugal density dynamics, emphatic synergy between private and public space, a reliance on orthogonal forms and finally an utter lack of adornment or decoration to avoid capitalist conceptualisations of needless excess.

Characterised by these interconnected spaces, the Social Condenser form displayed several other tangible features. Architecture of this persuasion valorised open spaces by opting against dividing walls and private amenities such as personal kitchens, bathrooms and living rooms with a view to minimising individualised existence within a building. As such, Social Condensers were defined by “open, airy design” which prompted people to collectively fill the free space thereupon subordinating their individuality for wider social unity within the built environment.

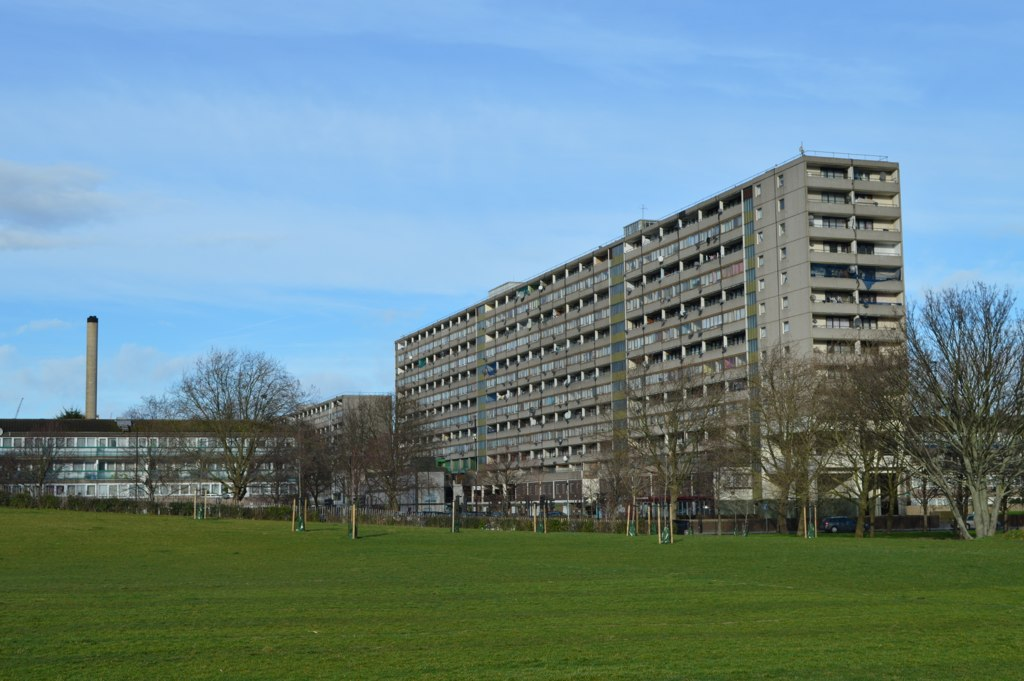
Aylesbury Estate, 2015

Viewed through a more exterior lens, Social Condensers can be grouped into two distinct classifications; planned Social Condensers and accidental Social Condensers. A planned Social Condenser refers to one that was designed and built with the intention of influencing human behaviour and defining the relationship between people within a constructed environment. A contemporary example of such a Social Condenser includes the Aylesbury Estate which was built between 1963 and 1977 in Southeast London with an explicitly delineated purpose at the forefront of its design. This purpose entailed a clear commitment to housing London’s lowest socioeconomic bracket while standardising room layouts, ensuring liberal movement of people throughout the space and a commitment to integrating natural light and air flow. In contrast, an accidental Social Condenser refers to one that was constructed without a guiding modus operandi of spatial and interpersonal theory but rather seemed to have an effect on human behaviour after people were allowed to flow freely through the space. For example, ‘Arry’s Bar was initially designed to accommodate football fans of the English club Millwall F.C. but gradually demonstrated its capacity for activating radical confluence between people thereby enacting the primary objective of the Social Condenser. The presence of accidental Social Condensers indicates a clear and codified set of characteristics that can be recognised and retrospectively applied, allowing a viewer to identify Social Condensers within an architectural landscape defined by diverse styles.

== Context ==
The Social Condenser is a form with deep-rooted connections to Soviet constructivist theory within a political sphere of socialist autocracy. Pioneered by Moisei Ginzburg and the OSA Group, this architectural concept was shaped by the ideologies and actions of Vladimir Lenin as he sought to enact an agenda of collective upheaval in the decade after the October Revolution. In his 1920 speech to the Moscow Gubernia Conference of the R.C.P.(B.), Lenin delivered a maxim which defined his view of a socialist society:

“Communism is Soviet power plus the electrification of the whole country”

This statement would indeed influence the constructivist neoterics of the Social Condenser who later extrapolated Lenin’s words into their architecture. The fascination with electricity that permeated this epoch led to the creation of a style that allegorically mimicked the function of an electrical condenser (contemporarily known as a transformer), constantly intensifying and attenuating the way in which a current flows through a circuit. Ginzburg took Lenin’s view of electrification and wed it to the notions of human movement dynamics and circuitry thus creating the concept of the Social Condenser which it was hoped would “transform Soviet citizens into revolutionary communards” through didactic architecture.

The Social Condenser also played a key role in actualising the Soviet upheaval coinciding with the anniversary of the October Revolution. In 1927, it became a Leninist imperative to differentiate the architecture of the post-revolutionary era from the architecture of the pre-revolutionary era in order to signify a shift towards new Soviet glory through socialist collectivism. As such, the Social Condenser was to be the very idea that would separate the avant-garde modernism of post-October Russia from both pre-revolutionary Russian modernism and the modi operandi of other capitalist nations at the time. The concept could be applied to residential buildings, public buildings, public space, and wider city planning, allowing Lenin to activate the Soviet populace and prescribe the socialist way of life through civic design.

== Influence Over Human Behaviour ==
Within a sphere of Leninism, the Social Condenser utilised spatial forms which would not only influence the human experience but also explicitly condition human behaviour. It became increasingly intertwined with the psychological, ideological, behavioural and, in some cases educational facets of human existence with a view to redefining the way in which society could function. This arose in response to the conflicting concepts of constructivism’s antecedent, suprematism, which valorised human sensation over all else. Hence, the Social Condenser sought to enact real, physical change in how humans interacted, going beyond verbal and written instruction, and embedding it in the architectural fabric of the urban environment.

Analogous to this, the Social Condenser became a catalyst for social mixing, deconstructing the class system and doing away with strict civil stratification in Soviet Russia. Consequently, the Social Condensers became arenas for class synergy; intelligentsia, the working class, entertainers, and many more brought together through architecture. Under a radical socialist agenda to dismantle old hierarchies of class and gender through design, women also gained greater liberty due to the Social Condenser’s eradication of private amenities associated with early 20th-century female domesticity.

Essentially, the Social Condenser sought to develop and codify the emergent Soviet way of life by gearing the human experience at the time towards collective engagement within a world of cultural upheaval in the post-revolutionary period. By imposing shared existence through the Social Condenser form, the Constructivists hoped to pioneer Lenin’s vision for an advanced society within which human attitudes and beliefs were defined by collective thought. In cultivating this vision, it was hoped that the Soviet consciousness could be distilled into a concise and collective one that conduced to the progress of a new Russia.

Lenin hoped that Social Condensers could become catalysts for social activism and domestic reformation. By influencing humans on these microcosmic levels, he envisioned a gradual collective awakening within the Soviet Union.

== Moisei Ginzburg, OSA and the Narkomfin Building ==
A pioneer of the Social Condenser, Moisei Ginzburg played a key role in advancing the architectural ideals of Constructivism by founding the Organisation of Contemporary Architects (OSA). Individually, Ginzburg had worked to develop and crystallise the tenets of Constructivism, exemplified in his 1924 publication Style and Epoch which served as a manifestation of everything that the Constructivists stood for. In this publication Ginzburg discusses several key concepts which helped him to formulate his theory surrounding the Social Condenser. These concepts included the changeability of architecture over time, Greco-Italic classical thought and Constructivism before he delved into an exploration of a “New Style” which would go on to influence his development of the Social Condenser as an architectural concept.

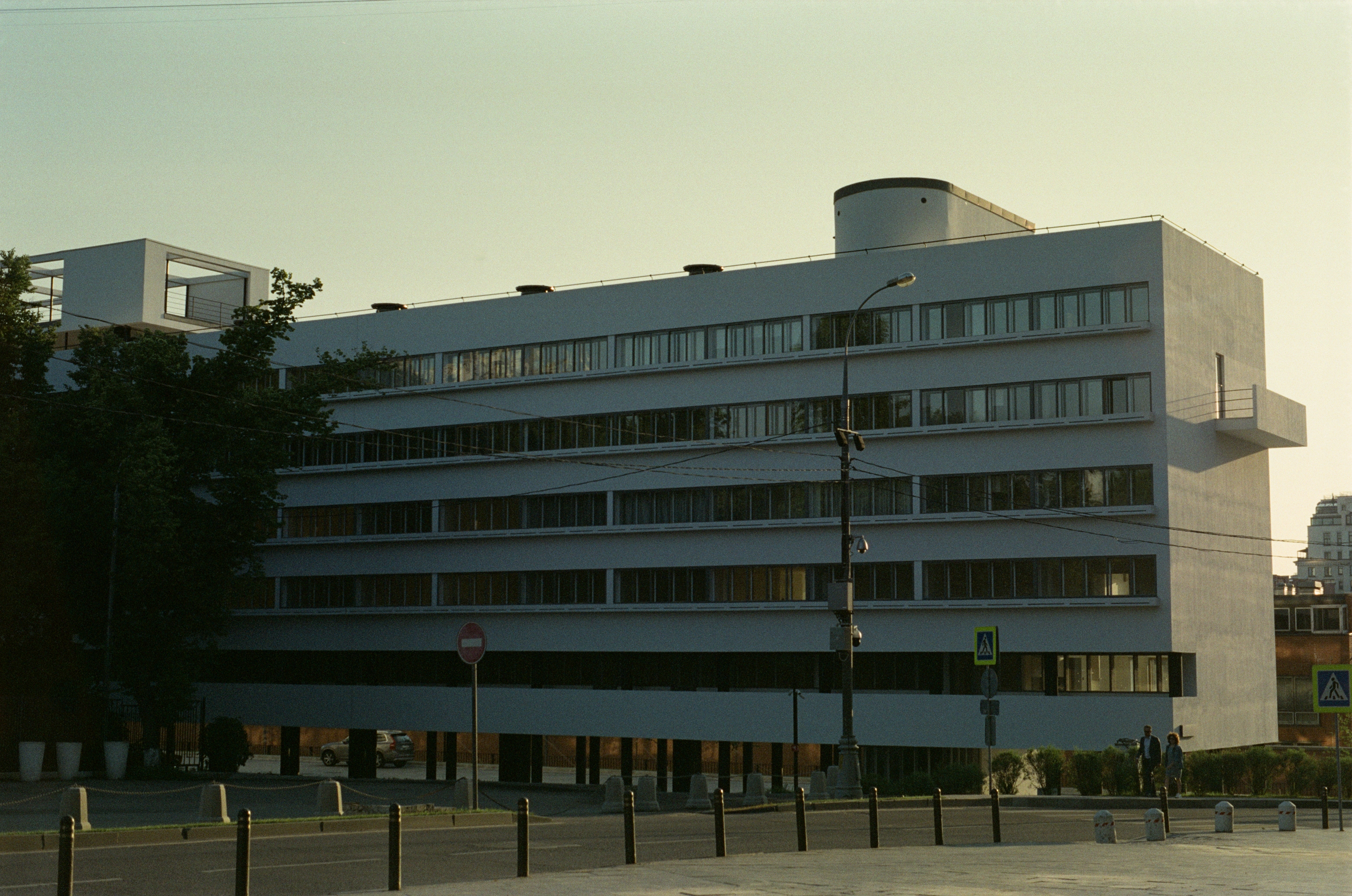
Narkomfin Building, 2020

The formation of the OSA in 1925 helped Ginzburg to realise his Constructivist hopes by working with like-minded individuals in a tight group of focused architects. The group was known for the design and construction of a number of Constructivist buildings in the Soviet Union including the Likhachev Palace of Culture, several apartment blocks and the Mostorg department store. However, it was for the Narkomfin Building in Moscow that both the OSA and Ginzburg received greatest publicity.

The Narkomfin is widely regarded as the stylistic epitome of the Social Condenser for its devotion towards promoting the socialist way of life. Featuring communal kitchens, dining halls and even shared bathrooms, the 54-unit building was defined by orthogonal design, iterative room plans and muted colour design. Additionally, the removal of the private facilities resulted in smaller rooms, allowing for a greater number of units which helped to accommodate the issue of overcrowding in Moscow during the 1920s and 1930s.

In designing this building, Ginzburg was driven by two key imperatives. Firstly, the aforementioned desire to inspire and precipitate the socialist way of life by minimising private activities and advocating for collective interaction through open and shared amenities. However, there was a secondary motive that defined Ginzburg’s architectural practice for the Narkomfin Building. In addition to enacting Lenin’s plan for a new Soviet psyche, he sought to “ease life emotionally, and provide residents with rest and relaxation in a way that they could experience the joy of life.” As such, Ginzburg was able to bring about a sense of relief among the otherwise work-laden Soviet proletariats, promoting the enjoyment of finer details through restful collective spaces.

== Architectural Influence ==
In the post-war period, the Social Condenser influenced European social housing through its orthogonal forms and functional unit designs, extrapolated by architects such as Le Corbusier in his Unité d’Habitation with a view to inspiring collectivism after the war.

The Social Condenser has also antithetically informed deconstructivist architecture as contemporary architects seek to unravel the determinism of the constructivist style in favour of more fragmented structures. While Social Condensers sought to influence human behaviour through considered design, the deconstructivist buildings of today engage just one design tactic; “a simple and random morphological gesture that removes sense from form”. This lies in opposition to the functional nature of the Soviet Social Condensers which were actively designed to inspire collectivism.

Despite this postmodern movement away from the Social Condenser form, there are still architects promulgating or appropriating the principles of Ginzburg’s idea in their work today, thereby perpetuating his Soviet vision. For example, the LocHal Public Library located in the Dutch city of Tilburg was designed by a collective of architects, Mecanoo, who sought to repurpose a redundant steel locomotive shed with a view to activating multifaceted interactions between people in a physical space. It is this desire to activate social interaction that leads to its classification as a Social Condenser. At the 2019 World Architecture Festival in Amsterdam, the LocHal Public Library was named ‘World Building of the Year’.
