= Aleksandr Deyneka =

Russian painter (1899–1969)

- Александр Александрович Дейнека
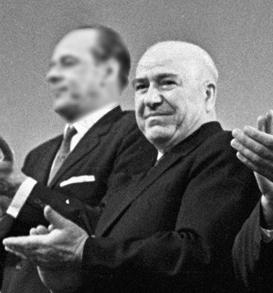
- Deyneka receiving the Lenin Prize in 1964
- Born: 20 May 1899; Kursk, Kursk Governorate, Russian Empire
- Died: 12 June 1969 (aged 70); Moscow, Russian SFSR, Soviet Union
- Resting place: Novodevichy Cemetery, Moscow
- Education: VKhUTEMAS
- Occupations: Painter; graphic artist; sculptor
- Spouse(s): Serafima Lychyova (1930–1959), Yelena Volkova-Deyneka (1959–1969)

Aleksandr Aleksandrovich Deyneka (Russian: Алекса́ндр Алекса́ндрович Дейне́ка; 20 May 1899 – 12 June 1969) was a Soviet painter, graphic artist and sculptor, regarded as one of the most important Russian modernist figurative painters of the first half of the 20th century. His Collective Farmer on a Bicycle (1935) has been described as exemplifying the socialist realist style.

== Life and career ==
Deyneka was born in Kursk and studied at Kharkov Art College (apprentice of Alexander Lubimov) and at VKhUTEMAS. He was a founding member of groups such as OST and Oktyabr, and his work gained wide exposure in major exhibitions. His paintings and drawings (the earliest are often monochrome due to the shortage of art supplies) depict genre scenes as well as labour and often sports. Deyneka later began painting monumental works, such as The Defense of Petrograd in 1928, which remains his most iconic painting, and The Battle of Sevastopol in 1942, The Outskirts of Moscow. November 1941 and The Shot-Down Ace. His mosaics are a feature of Mayakovskaya metro station in Moscow. He is in the highest category "1A – a world famous artist" in "United Art Rating".

Deyneka is buried in the Novodevichy Cemetery in Moscow.

== Legacy ==
The title from one of Deyneka's works, "Work, Build and Don't Whine", was used as the title for a 2016 exhibition of Socialist Realist art at London's Gallery for Russian Arts and Design. One modern critic, however, suggested that Deyneka's posters are less radical than his fore-bearers like Alexander Rodchenko, and as a result, less interesting.

== Honours and awards ==
- Hero of Socialist Labour (1969)
- People's Painter of the USSR (1963)
- People's Painter of the RSFSR (1959)
- Honoured Worker of the Arts Industry of the RSFSR (1945)
- Order of Lenin
- Order of the Red Banner of Labour (1962)
- Lenin Prize (1964)

== Selected works ==
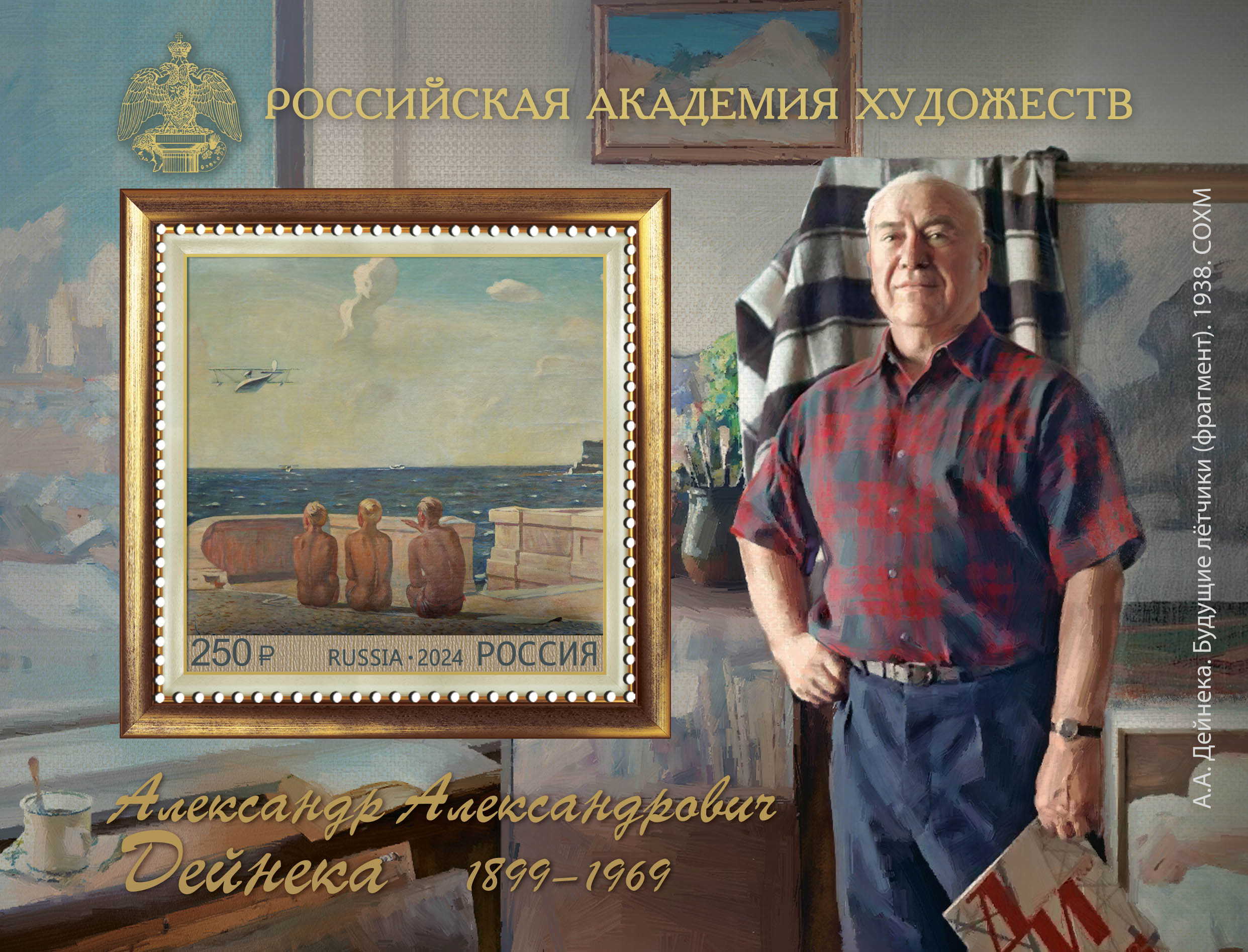
Deneyka in his studio and his work The Future Pilots, 1937

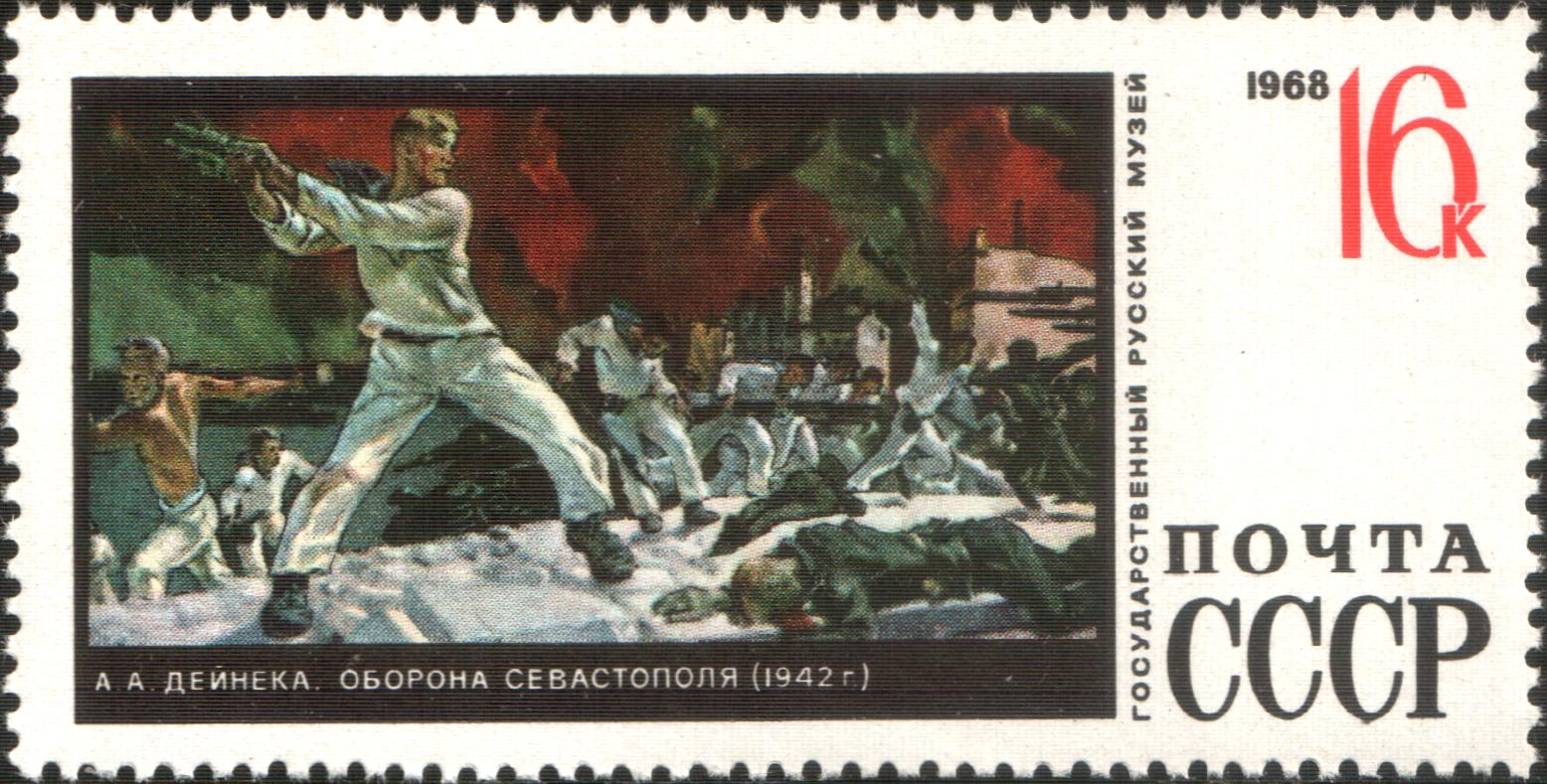
The Defense of Sevastopol, 1942

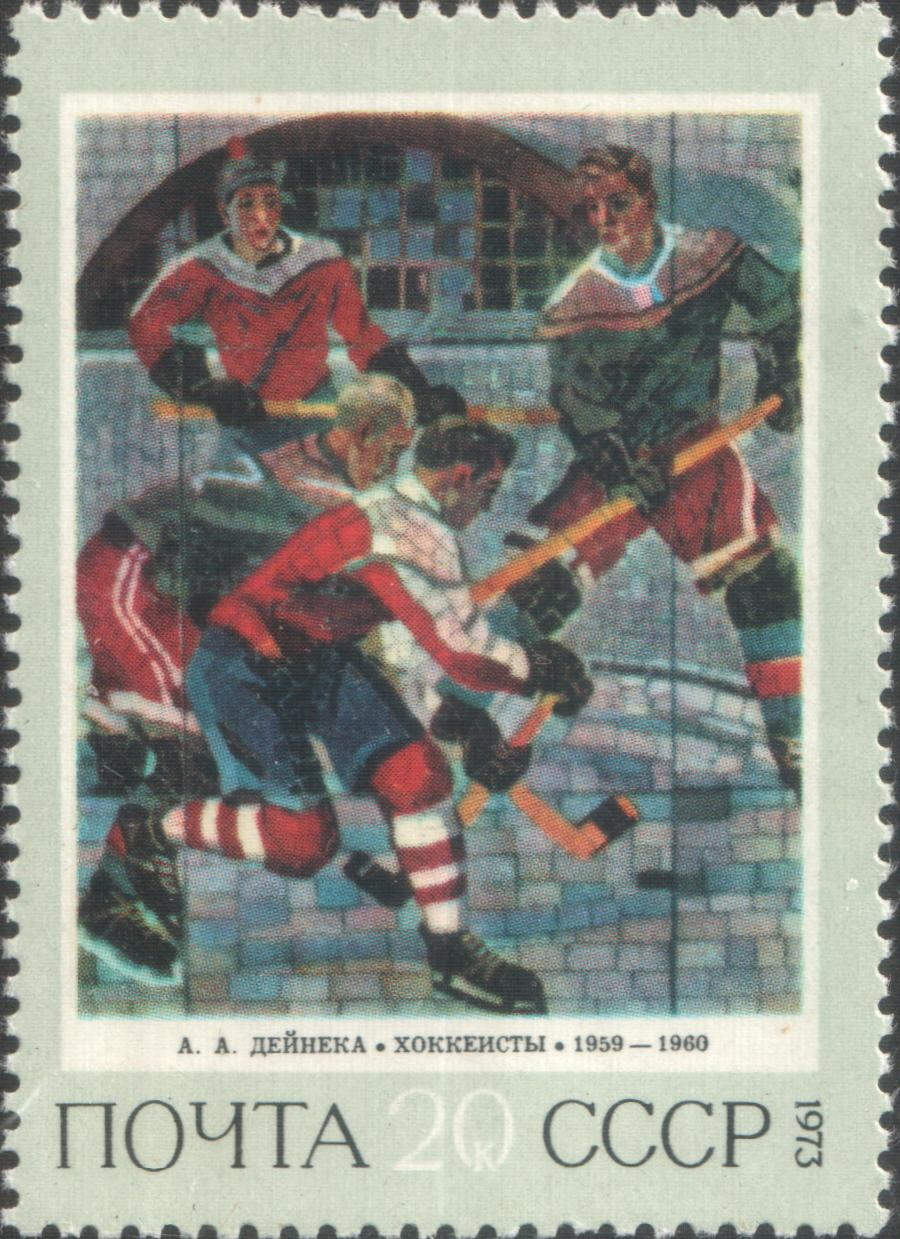
Hockey Players, mosaic, 1959–1960

- Three Women's Figures, 1920s
- The Cabaret, 1921
- Перед спуском в шахту, 1924
- Football, 1924
- After the Rain. Kursk, 1925
- Springtime, 1925
- The Skiers, 1926
- Tennis, 1926
- На стройке новых цехов, 1926
- Textile Workers, 1927
- The Ode to the Spring, 1927
- The Defense of Petrograd, 1928, Central Museum of the Defense Forces of the USSR, Moscow
- Механизируем Донбасс! (poster), 1930
- Китай на пути освобождения от империализма (poster), 1930
- Надо стать самим специалистами (poster), 1930
- Book Cover, 1931
- The Interventionists' Mercenary, 1931
- On the Balcony, 1931
- Crosscountry Race, 1931
- A Girl at the Window. Winter, 1931
- Mother, 1932
- Soccer Game, 1932
- The Sleeping Boy With Cornflowers, 1932
- Noon, 1932
- The Football Player, 1932
- Кто кого?, 1932
- In the Airs, 1932
- The Night Landscape with Horses and Dry Grasses, 1933
- Girls Swimming, 1933
- Dry Leaves, 1933
- Resting Children, 1933
- Communists at Interrogation, 1933
- Физкультурница / Работать, строить и не ныть! (poster), 1933
- Without Work in Berlin, 1933
- The Pier, 1933
- The Race, 1933
- Runners, 1934
- Skiers, 1934
- Landscape with a Herd, 1934
- Goalkeeper, 1934
- A Pioneer. Kursk, 1934
- Crimean Pioneers, 1934
- A Parachuter above the Sea, 1934
- Quirinal Place, Rome, 1934
- Spanish Stairways, 1934
- A Street in Rome
- Monks, 1935
- An Italian motif, 1935
- The Park, 1935
- The Portrait of S.I.L. with the Straw Hat, 1935
- Tuileries, 1935
- Quai de la Seine, 1935
- Paris. In a Café, 1935
- Une parisienne, 1935
- Негритянский концерт, 1935
- The Boredom, 1935
- The Road to Mount-Vernon, 1935
- "Collective Farmer on a Bicycle". Archived from the original on 24 June 2008., 1935
- A Lunch Break in Donbass, 1935
- Первая пятилетка, 1936
- The Model, 1936
- The Future Pilots, 1937
- The Stakhanovites, 1937
- Woman in Red, 1939
- The Lilacs
- Nikitka – The First Russian Pilot, 1940
- The Left March, 1941
- The Outskirts of Moscow. November 1941
- Sverdlov Place in December 1941
- Evening. The Patriarch Ponds, 1941
- A Burned down Village, 1942
- Эвакуация колхозного скота
- Колхозницы роют противотанковые рвы на подступах к Москве
- Ремонт танков на прифронтовом заводе
- Танки идут на фронт
- Наступление началось
- The Defense of Sebastopol, 1942
- The Knocked down Ace, 1943
- Nude Woman Sitting, 1943
- Under Occupation, 1944
- Expanse, 1944
- Above the Devastated Berlin, 1944
- Berlin. The Day of the Declaration, 1945
- A Stadium in Berlin, 1945
- Near Kursk. Tuskor' River, 1945
- Relay Race (sculpture), 1945
- A Boxer (sculpture), 1947
- 100-meter Race (sculpture), 1947
- Relay Race on the Garden Ring, 1947
- Donbass, 1947
- The Studio Window, 1947
- In Sebastopol, 1947
- Self-portrait, 1948
- The Space of Building Sites under Moscow, 1949
- The Skiers (mosaic)], 1950
- Football Players (sculpture), 1950
- Перед забегом (sculpture), 1951
- A Nude Girl, 1951
- Дачный поселок Кратово, 1951
- In Sebastopol, 1947
- On the Skating Rink in Kratovo, 1951
- The Snow Maiden, 1954
- The Laying Woman with a Ball, 1954
- Still Life. Strawberries, 1955
- A Nude Model, 1955
- Football players (sculpture), 1955
- The Tractor Driver, 1956
- In Sebastopol, 1956
- Near the Sea, 1956–1957
- Putting the Shot (sculpture), 1957
- Голова парашютиста (mosaic), 1957
- A Nice Morning (mosaic)], 1959–1960
- Hockey Players (mosaic)], 1959–1960
- October Slogans of Peace by the Narvsky Gate, 1960
- A Milker (mosaic), 1962
- The Red Guardsman (mosaic), 1962
- A Villa in Rome, 1965
- The Young Designer, 1966
- In the South (detail), 1966
- Владимир Маяковский в РОСТА
- Летнее приволье
- Running Sportswoman (sculpture)
- The Cat and the Cook

== See also ==
- List of Russian artists
