= Novinskiy Boulevard =

Street in Moscow, Russia

Coordinates: 55.7547°N 37.5833°E

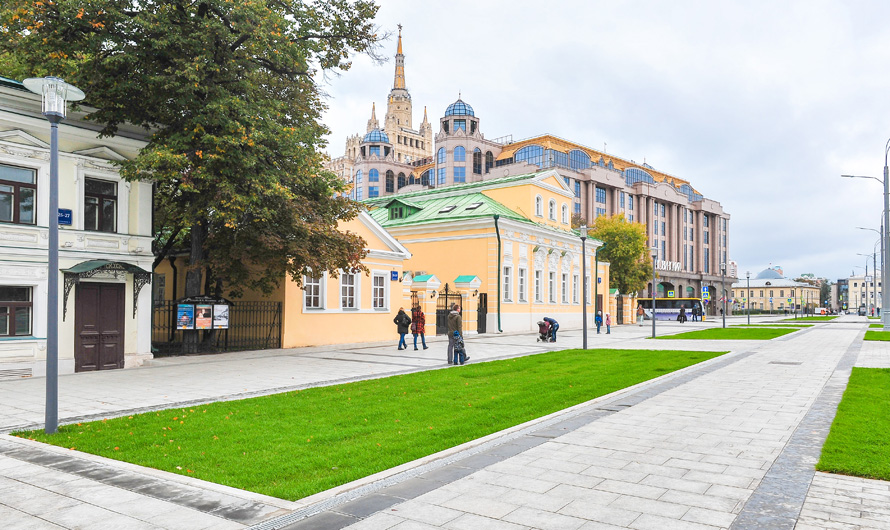
- Interactive map of Novinskiy Boulevard
- Native name: Новинский бульвар (Russian)
- Location: Moscow, Russia; Central Administrative Okrug
- Nearest metro station: Smolenskaya; Smolenskaya; Barrikadnaya; Krasnopresnenskaya

Novinskiy Boulevard is a street in the Presnenskiy and Arbat districts of Moscow. Previously, the street was known as Novinsky Val after the Vvedensky Bogoroditsky Monastery, also called Novinsky (founded in 1410, abolished in 1764). After the boulevard was laid out in the mid-19th century, the name was changed to Novinsky Boulevard. There are different versions of the origin of the monastery's name. The most convincing of them connects the name with the foundation of the monastery in a new location (this is indirectly confirmed by the fact that at first the monastery was mentioned in sources not only as Novinsky, but also as Novy). Other versions, deriving the name from novins - canvases made by nuns, or from the name of the prophet Jesus Navin, are not confirmed. The monastery was located behind Zemlyanoy Val, to the north of today's Novy Arbat; Its territory included today's Konyushkovskaya Street and the ponds in the lower reaches of the Presnya. On June 3, 2020, two men from the Russian city of Barnaul staged a picket in support of the George Floyd Protests, outside of the U.S Embassy building. They were briefly detained for violating legislation installed in 2014 against unauthorized protests and pickets.

== Gallery ==
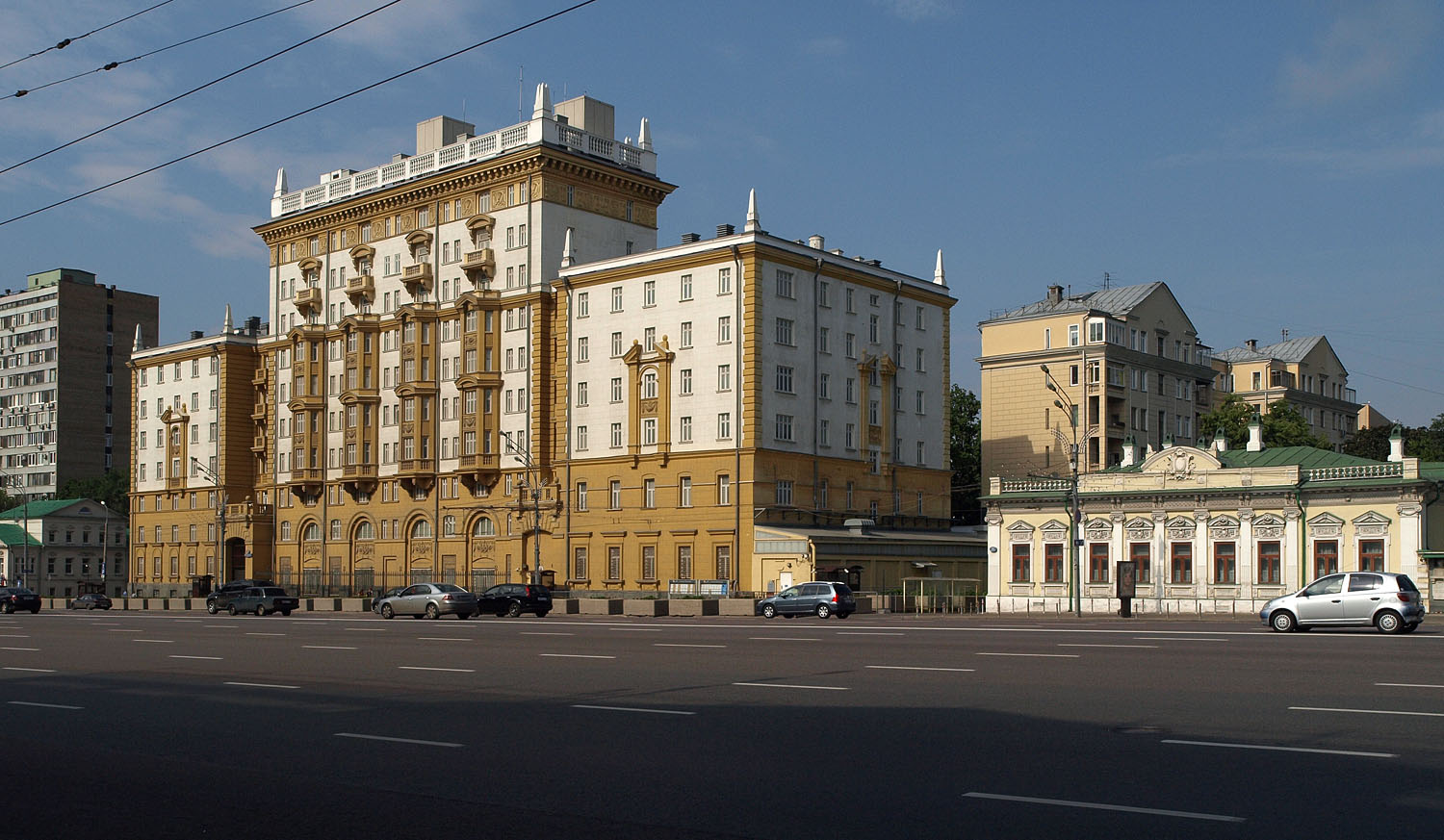
Embassy of the United States

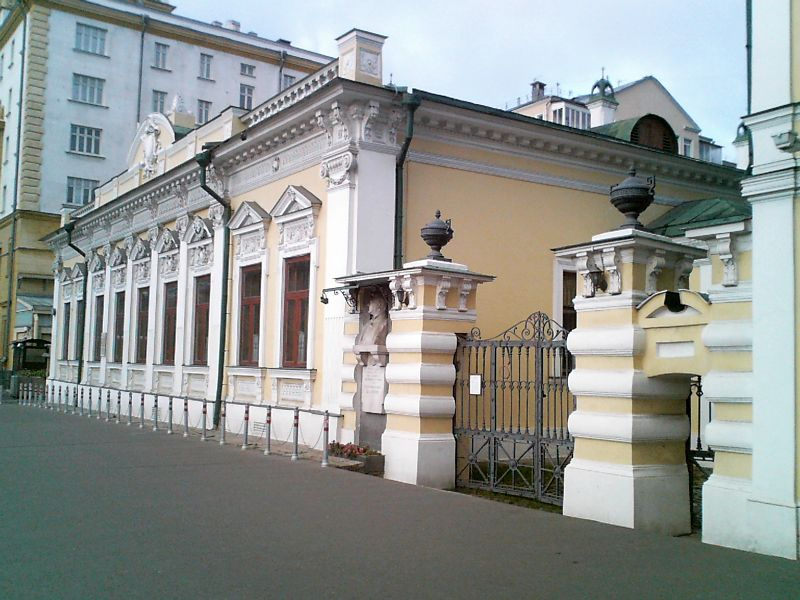
F. Shalyapin's House Museum

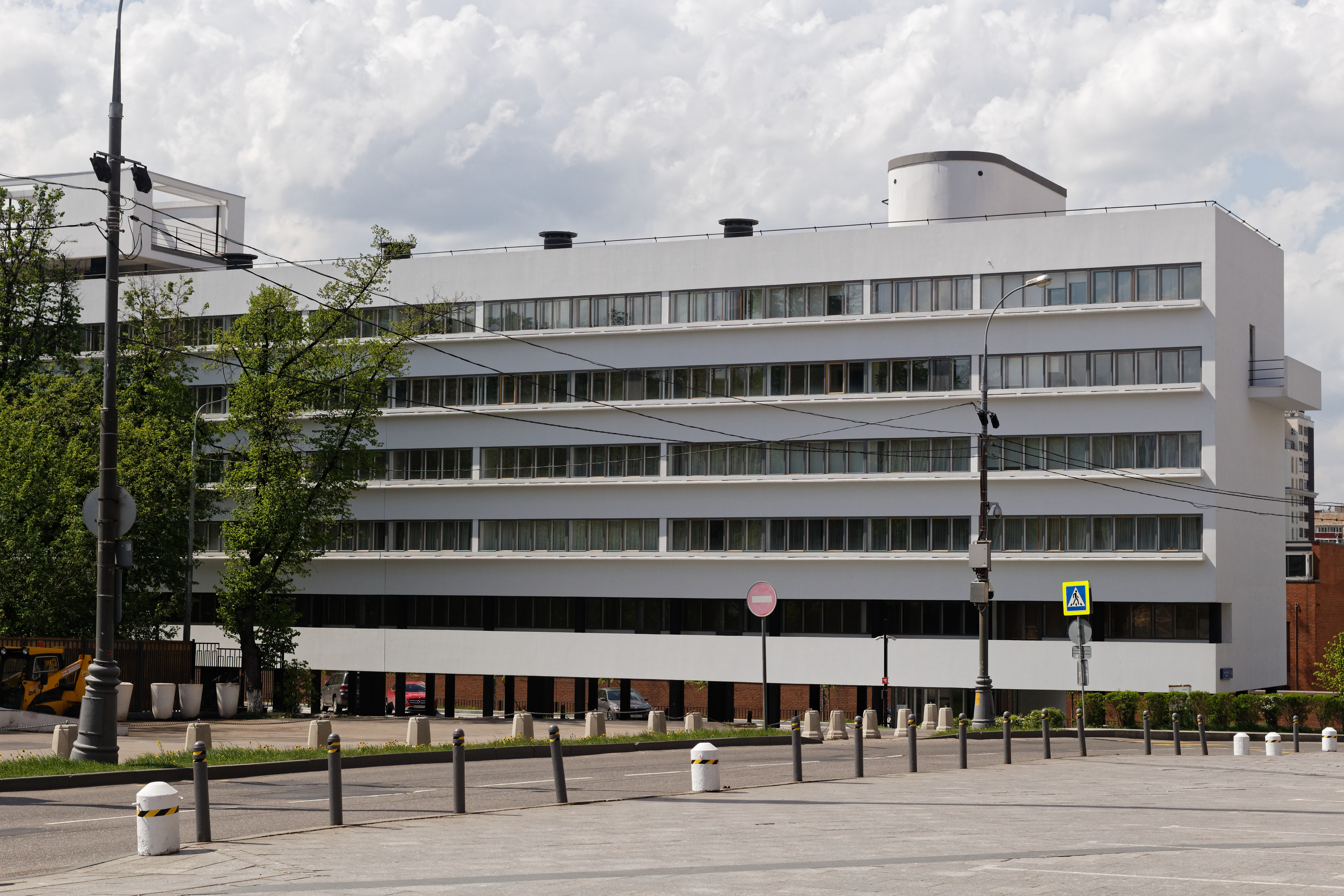
Narkomfin building

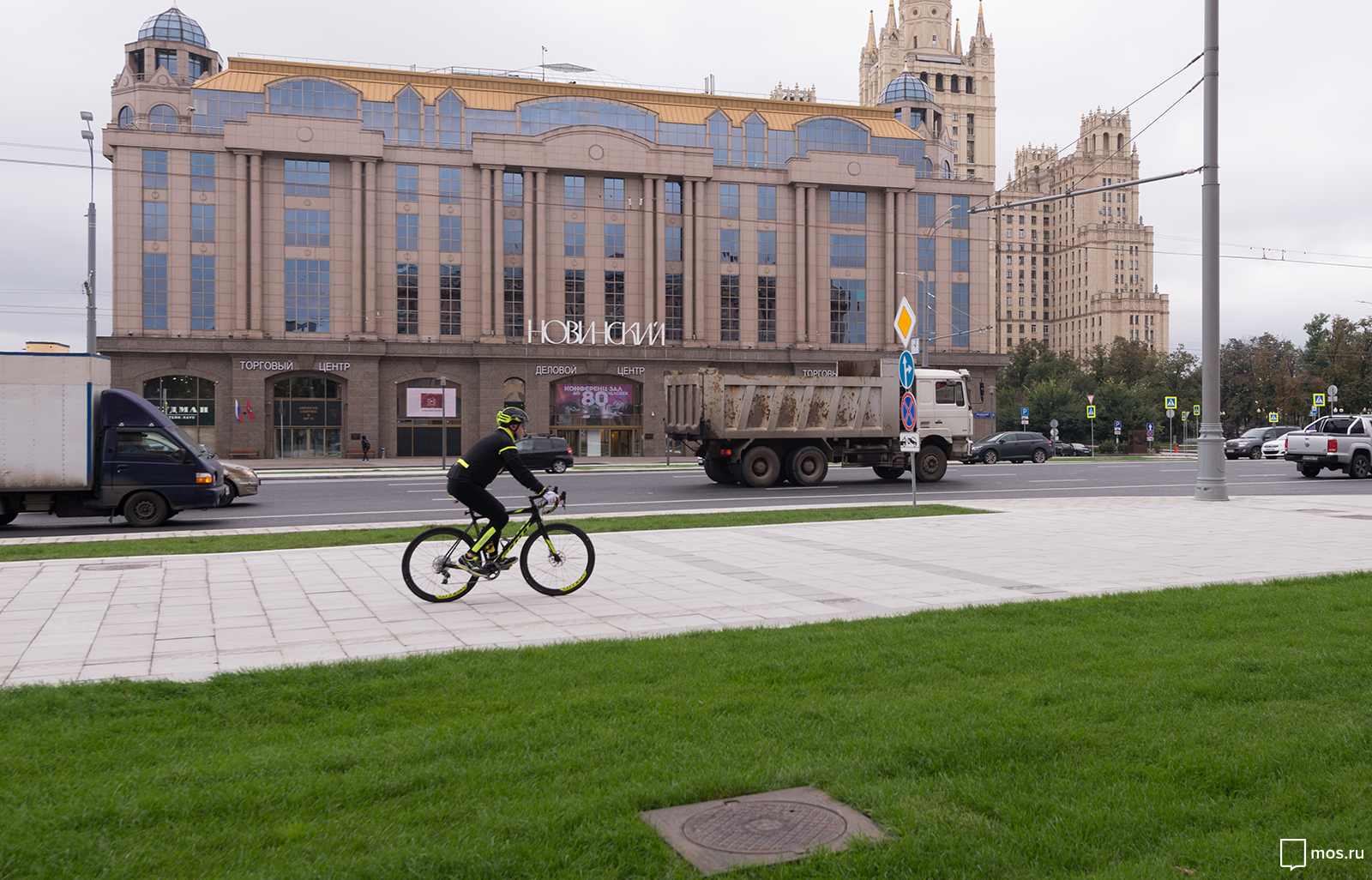
Novinsky Passage
