= Narkomfin building =

Constructivist housing block in Moscow, Russia

Coordinates: 55°45′26″N 37°34′52″E

Narkomfin Building
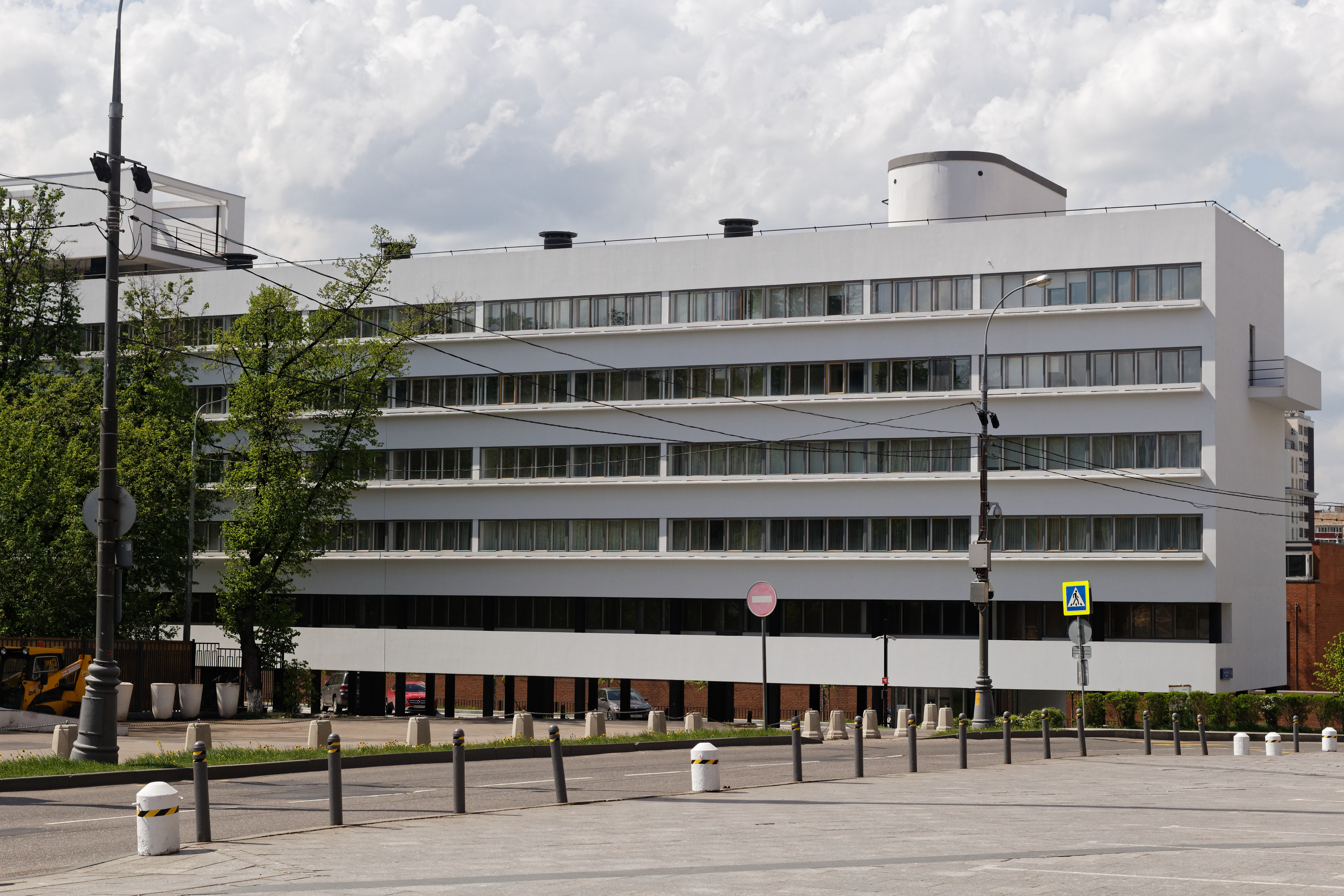
- Building after restoration.
- Interactive map of the Narkomfin Building area

General information
- Architectural style: Constructivism
- Location: Moscow, Russia
- Construction started: 1928
- Completed: 1930

Design and construction
- Architects: Moisei Ginzburg, Ignaty Milinis
- Architecture firm: OSA Group

The Narkomfin Building is a block of flats at 25, Novinsky Boulevard, in the Central district of Moscow, Russia. Conceived as a "transitional type of experimental house", it is a renowned example of Constructivist architecture and avant-garde housing design.

Though a listed "Cultural Heritage Monument" on the Russian cultural heritage register, it was in a deteriorating state for many years. Many units were vacated by residents. Reconstruction lasted three years, with the official opening of the renovated apartment building taking place on 9 July 2020.

== Architecture for collective living ==
The project for four planned buildings was designed by Moisei Ginzburg with Ignaty Milinis in 1928. Only two were built, completed in 1932. The color design for the buildings was created by Bauhaus student Hinnerk Scheper.

This apartment block, designed for high rank employees at the Commissariat of Finance (shortened to Narkomfin) was an opportunity for Ginzburg to try out many of the theories advanced by the Constructivist OSA group between 1926 and 1930 on architectural form and collective living. The building is made from reinforced concrete and is set in a park. It originally consisted of a long block of apartments raised on pilotis (with a penthouse and roof garden), connected by an enclosed bridge to a smaller, glazed block of collective facilities.

As advertised by the architects, the apartments were to form an intervention into the everyday life (or byt) of the inhabitants. By offering Communal facilities such as kitchens, creches and laundry as part of the block, the tenants were encouraged into a more socialist and, by taking women out of their traditional roles, feminist way of life. The structure was thus to act as a 'social condenser' by including within it a library and gymnasium.

On the other hand, architects of the 1920s had to face the social reality of an overcrowded socialist city: any single-family apartment unit with more than one room would eventually be converted to a multi-family kommunalka. Apartments could retain the single-family status if, and only if, they were physically small and could not be partitioned to accommodate more than one family. Any single-level apartment could be partitioned; thus, the avant-garde community (notably, Ginzburg and Konstantin Melnikov) designed such model units, relying on vertical separation of bedroom (top level) and combined kitchen and living room (lower level). Ilya Golosov implemented these cells for his Collective House in Ivanovo, and Pavel Gofman for communal housing in Saratov. Ginzburg refined their cell design based on real-life experience.

== Vertical apartment plan ==
Narkomfin has 54 units, none of them has a dedicated kitchen - at least, legally. Many residents partitioned their apartments to set aside a tiny kitchen. There are five inhabited floors, but only two corridors on second and Fifth level (an apartment split between third and second level connects to the second floor corridor, etc.).

Apartments were graded by how far along they were to being 'fully collectivised', ranging from rooms with their own kitchens to apartments purely for sleep and study. Most of the units belong to "Cell K" type (with double-height living room) and "Cell F" connecting to an outdoor gallery. The sponsor of the building, Commissar of Finance Nikolay Alexandrovich Milyutin, enjoyed a penthouse (originally planned as a communal recreation area). Milyutin is also known as an experimental city planner who had developed plans for a linear city.

== Influence ==
Isometric drawing of the Narkomfin building, showing cross-sections

Le Corbusier, who studied the building during his visits to the Soviet Union, was vocal about the debt he owed to the pioneering ideas of the Narkomfin building, and he used a variant of its duplex flat plans in his Unité d'Habitation. Other architects to have reused its ideas include Moshe Safdie, in his Expo 67 flats Habitat 67 and Denys Lasdun, in his luxury flats in St James', London. The idea of the 'social condenser' was also acknowledged by Berthold Lubetkin an influence on his work.

== The Narkomfin building as reality ==
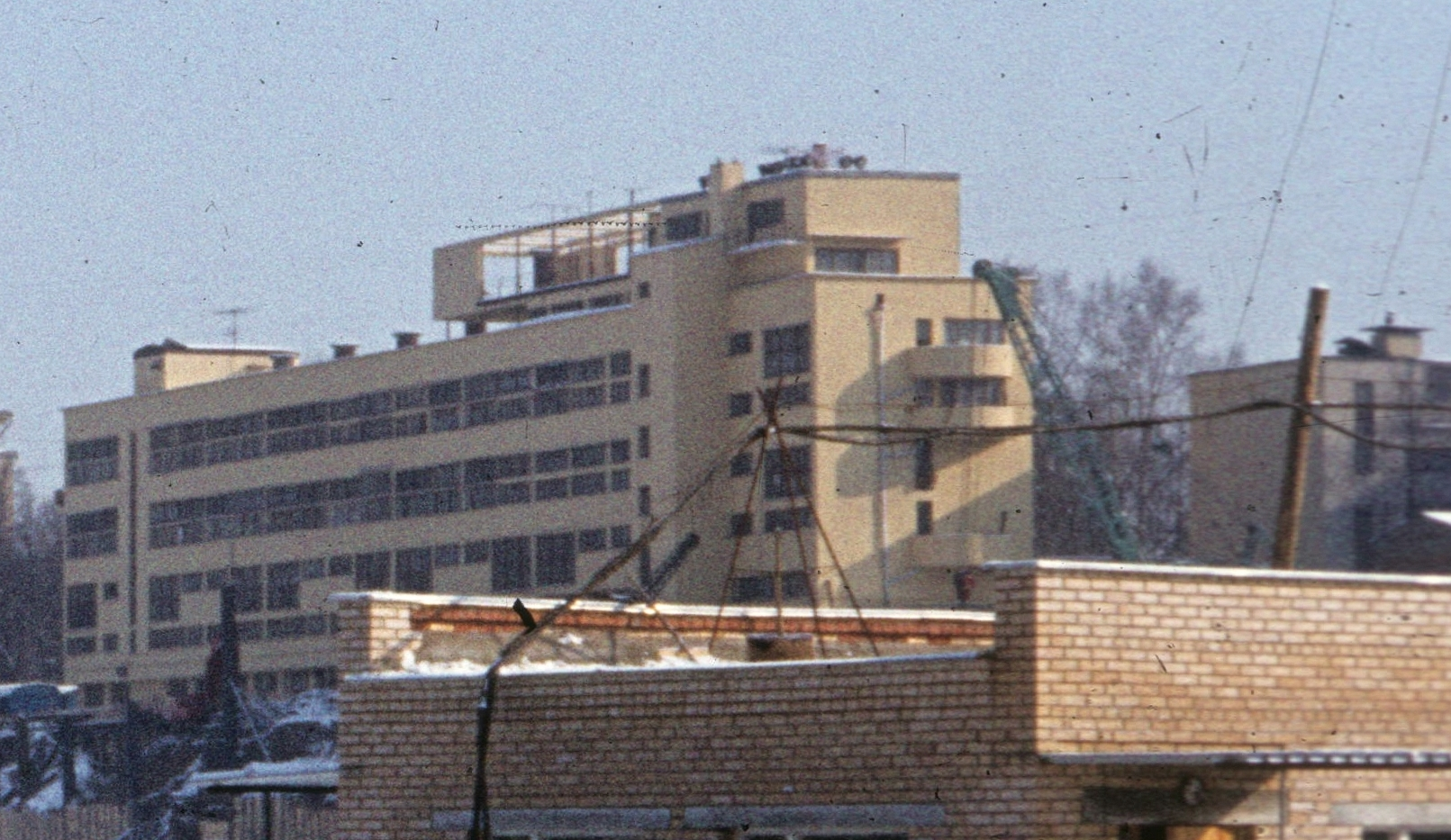
West view (the '70s)

The Utopianism and reformism of everyday life that was behind the building's idea fell out of favour almost as soon as it was finished. After the start of the Five Year Plan and Joseph Stalin's consolidation of power, its collectivist and feminist ideas were rejected as 'Leftist' or Trotskyist. In the 1930s, the ground floor, which was originally left free and suspended with pilotis, was filled with flats to help alleviate Moscow's severe housing shortage, while a planned adjoining block was built in the eclectic Stalinist style.

The building looks over the US embassy, which has discouraged the inhabitants from using the roof garden. The vicissitudes of the building were charted in Victor Buchli's book An Archaeology of Socialism which takes the flats and their inhabitants as a starting point for an analysis of Soviet 'material culture'.

== Modern status ==
Legally, each apartment unit in the building was privatized (beginning in 1992) by the residents. Later, a real estate speculator bought out a significant proportion of the apartments, as a consolidated apartment package with the city MIAN agency. The rest were still owned and inhabited by the residents, but with MIAN dominance creating a legal stalemate where the residents were unable to form a condominium association and operate the building independently. Therefore, the city agency had control over the future of the Narkomfin building.

By 2010, the building was in a very dilapidated state, although it was still partially inhabited. UNESCO placed it at the top of their 'Endangered Buildings' list, and it was placed on the World Monuments Fund's watchlist of endangered heritage sites three times. An international campaign was launched to save the landmark. Despite the Russian "Cultural Heritage Monument" code prohibiting any major re-planning of internal walls and partitions, there were accusations that illegal renovations were taking place. Alexei Ginzburg, grandson of Moisei Ginzburg, stated that "The situation [was] out of control" in 2014.

In 2016, the building began renovation under the guidance of Alexei Ginsburg, after development company Liga Prav bought it from an auction. Renovation was completed in July 2020, with the original designs restored where possible and all later additions removed.

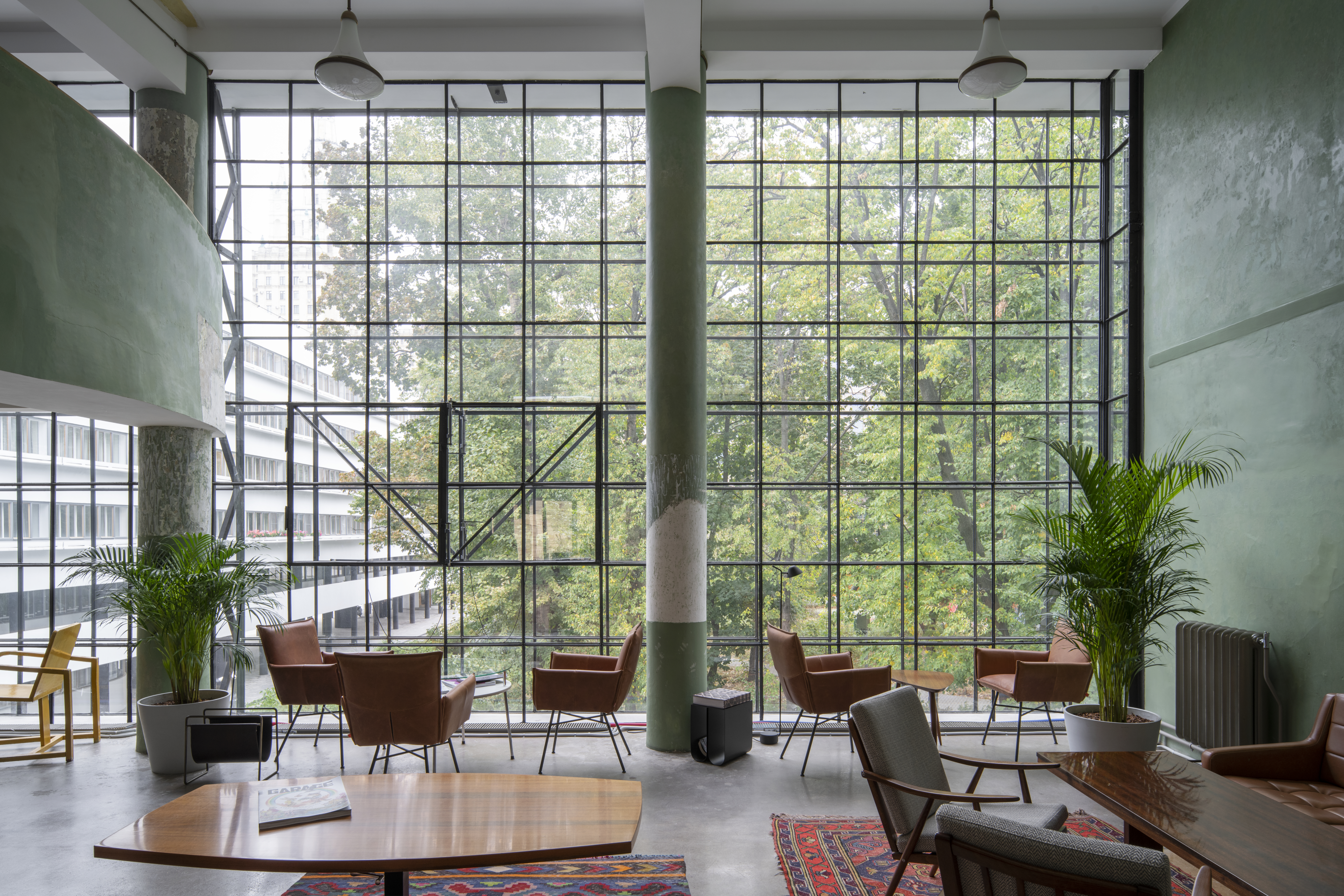

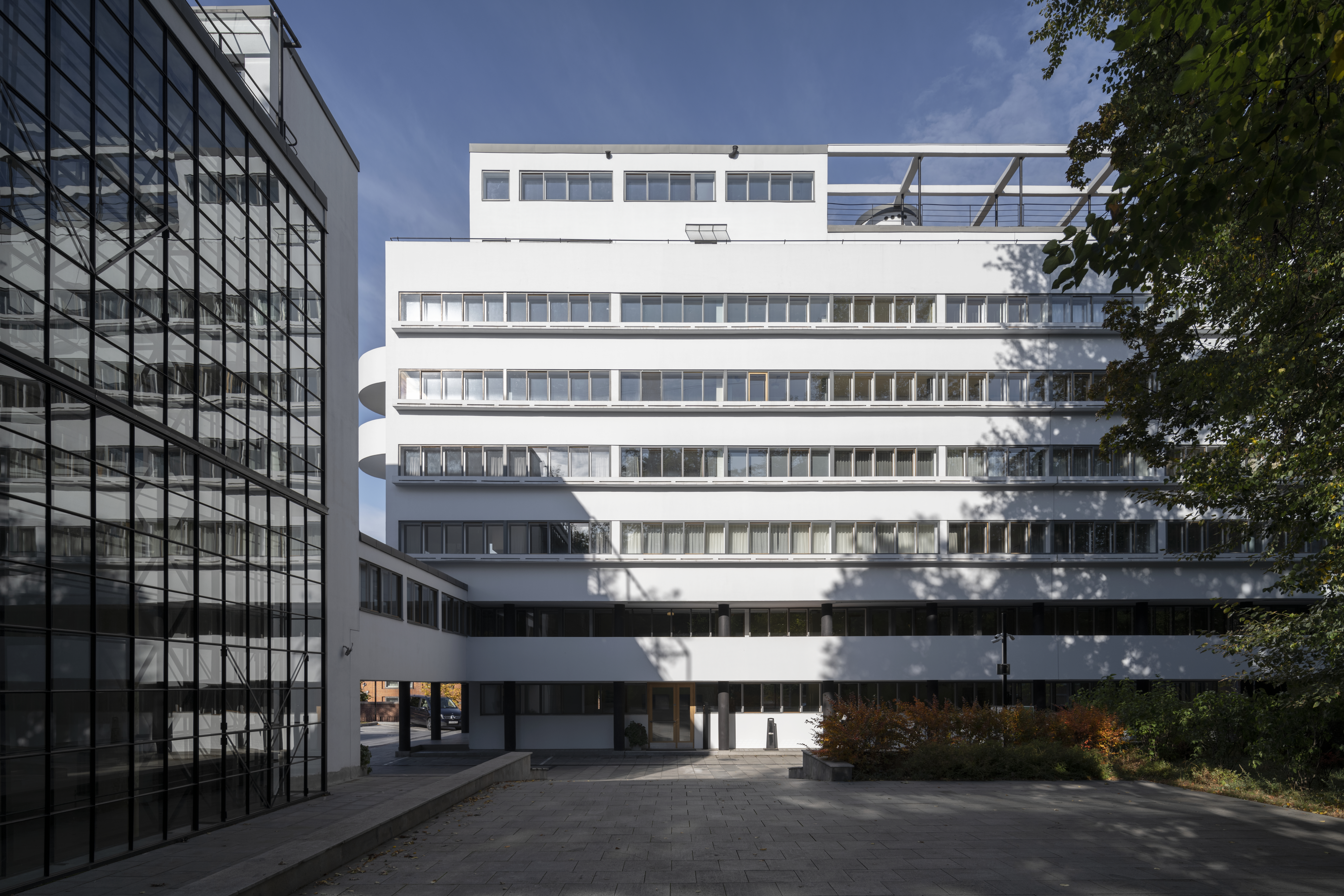

== Gallery ==
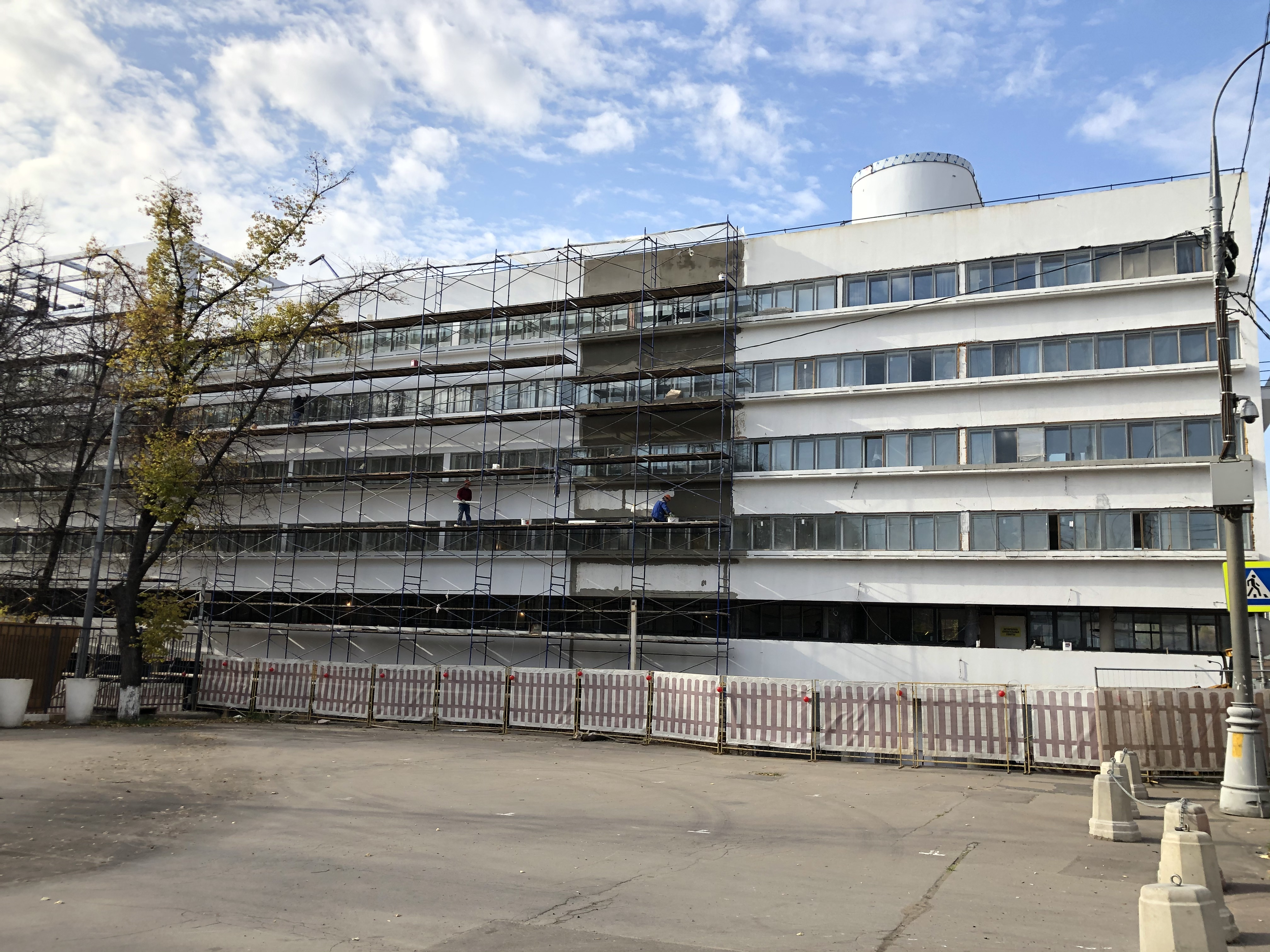
Renovation work in progress

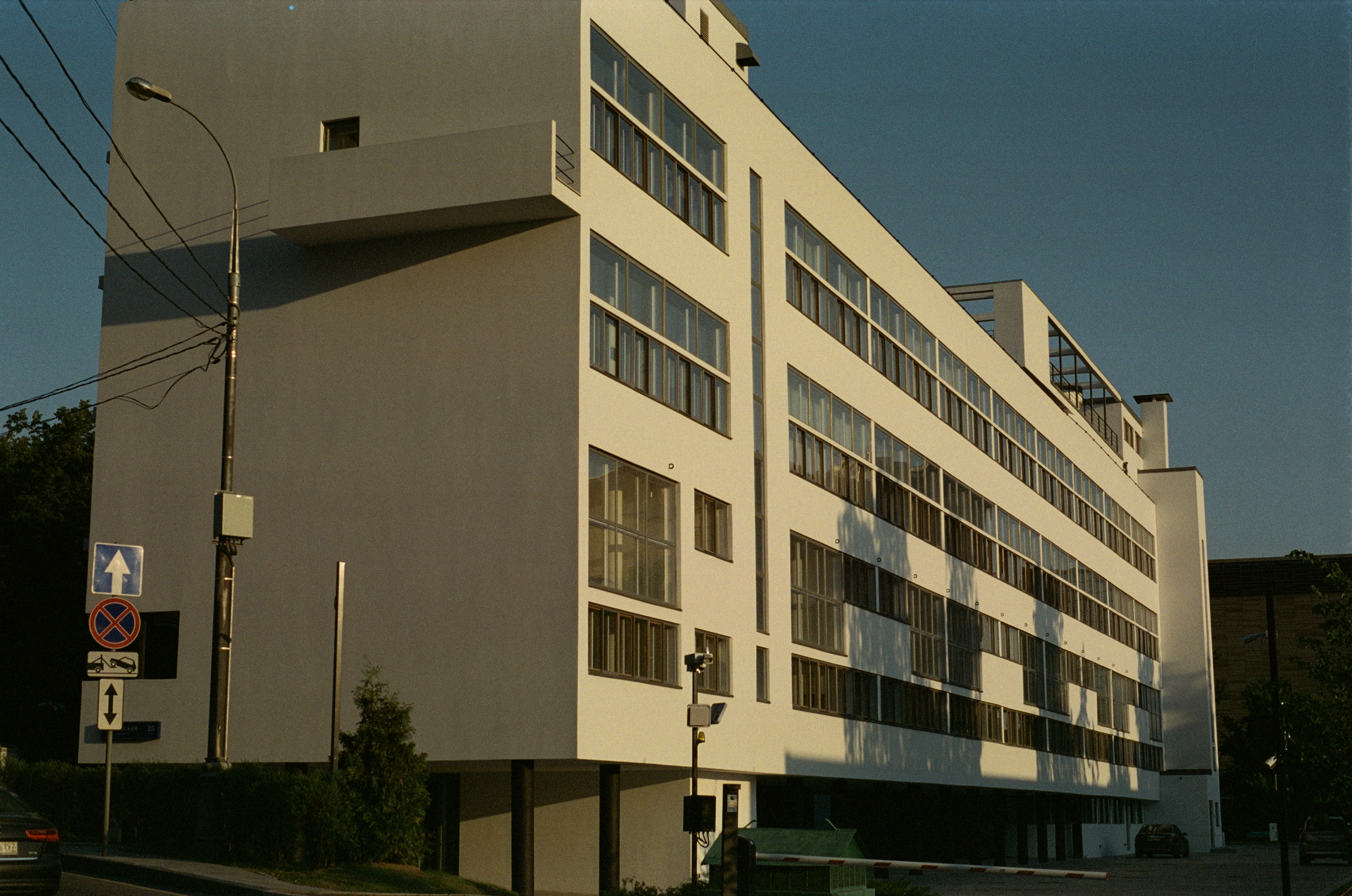
Building after restoration, view from west

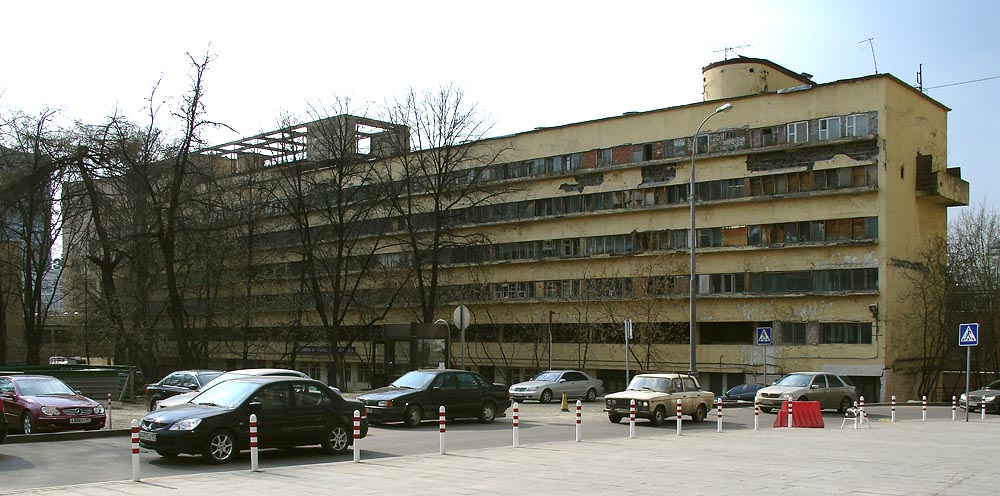
View from east (Garden Ring)

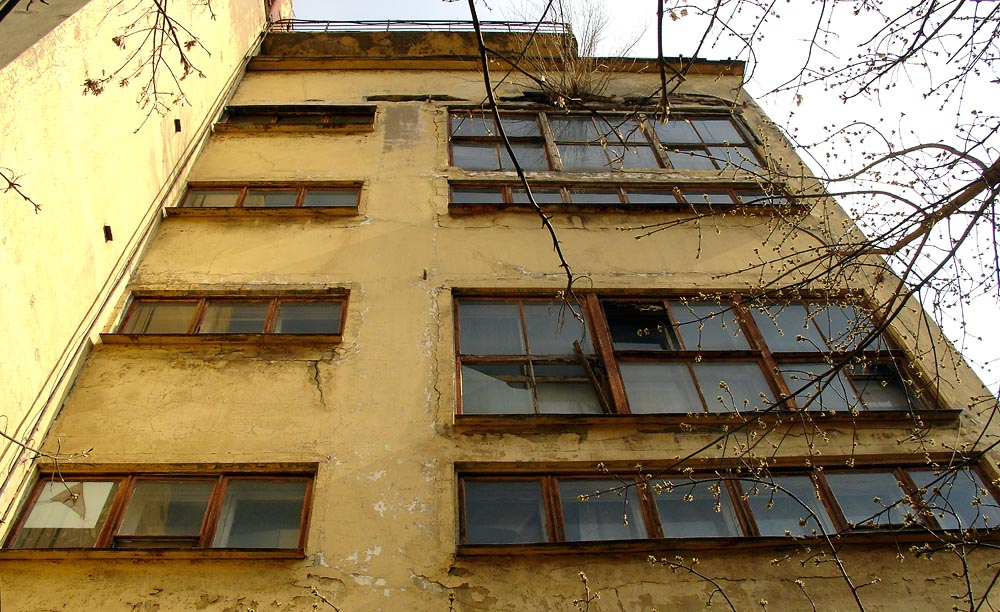
View from west

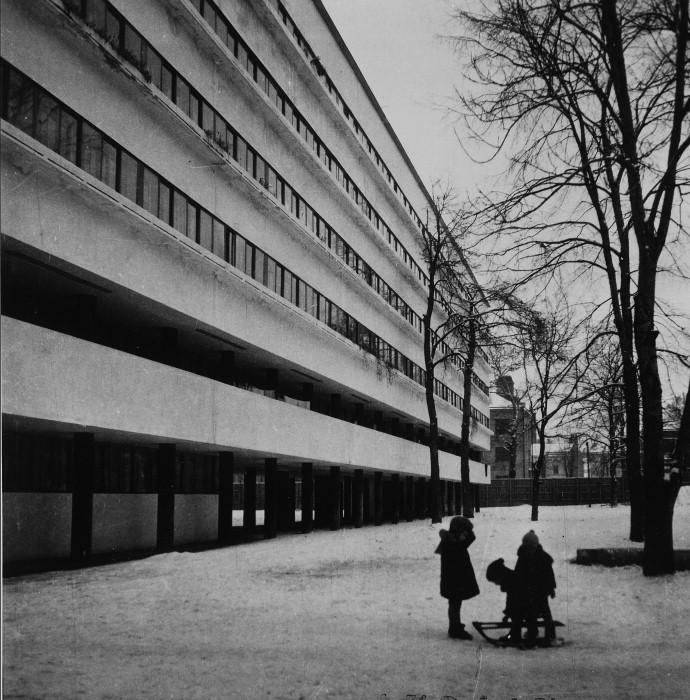
Building in 1930s

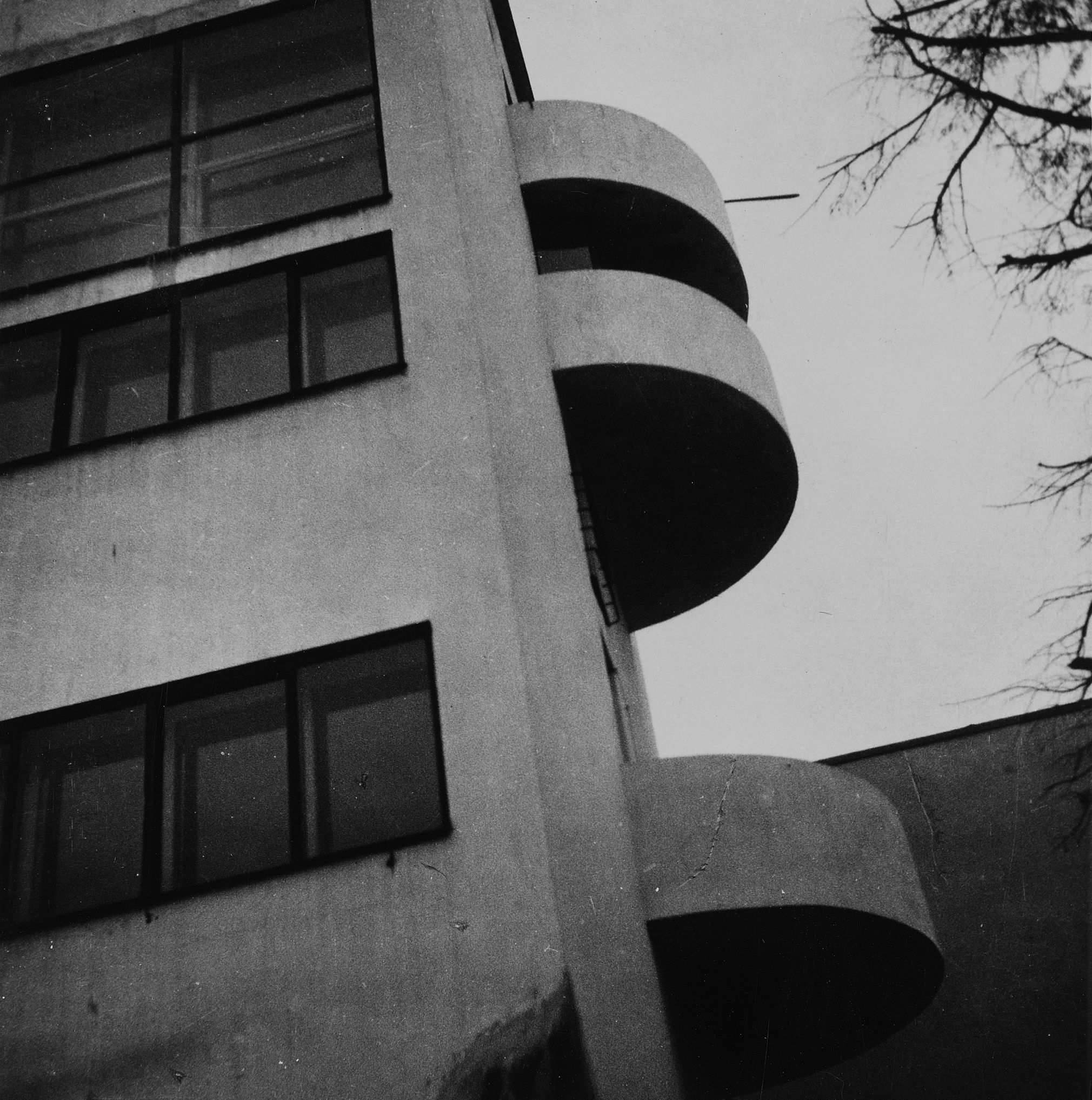
Building in 1930s

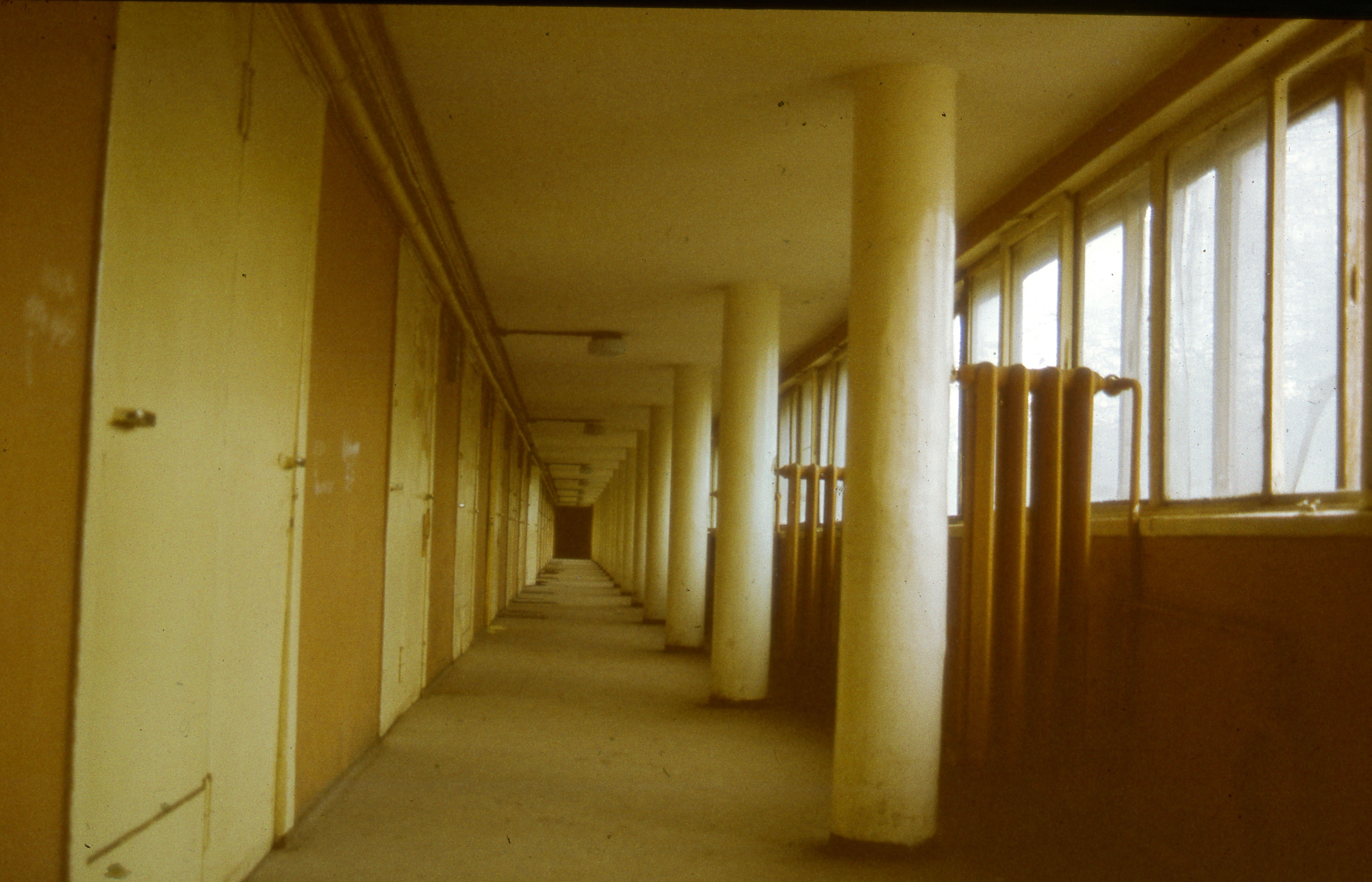
Inside
