= Expanse (painting) =

1944 painting by Aleksandr Deyneka

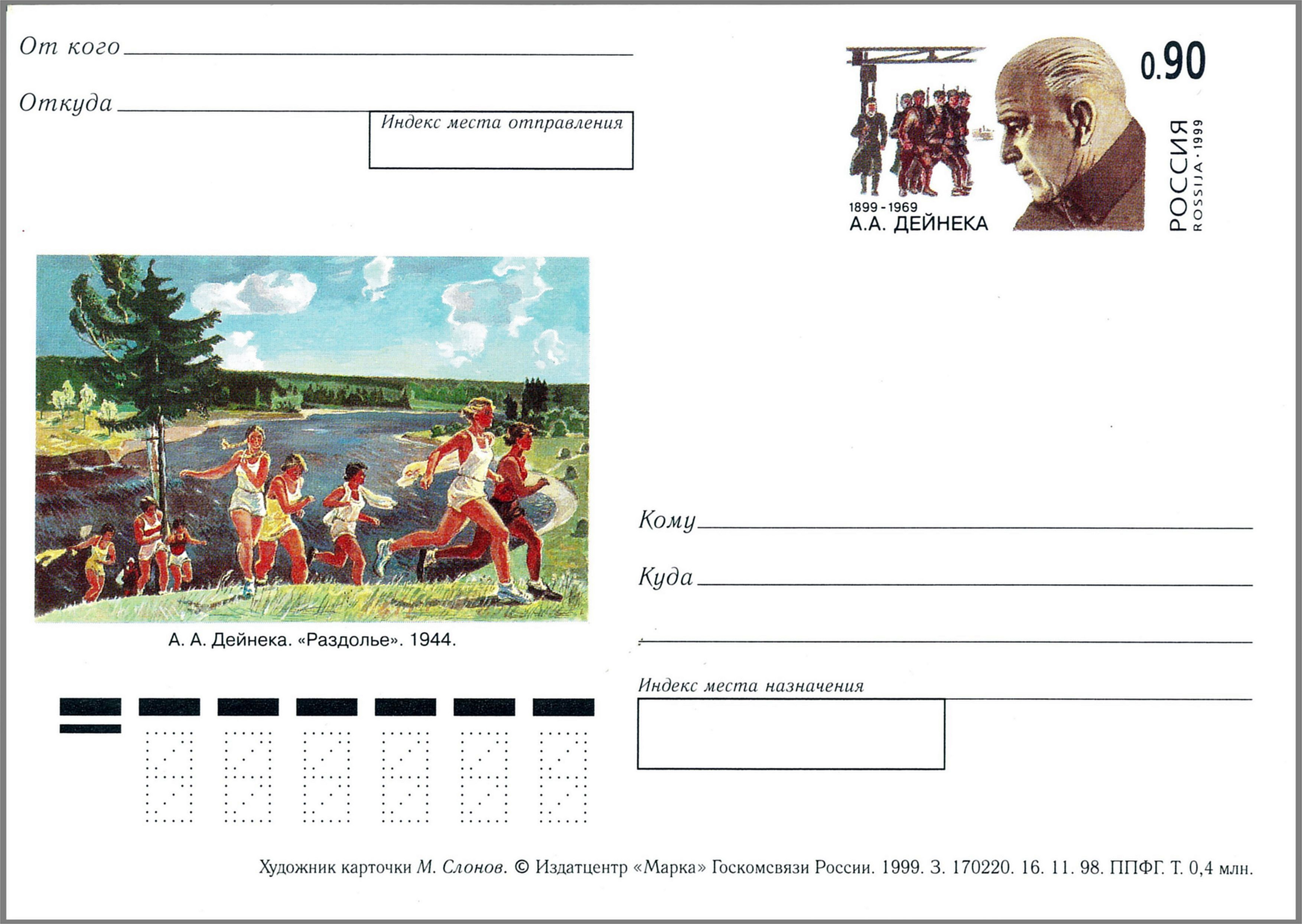
The painting on a postal envelope.

Expanse (Russian: Раздолье) is an oil on canvas painting by Soviet artist Aleksandr Deyneka completed in 1944. Its dimensions are 204 × 300 cm.

The artist began working on the painting before the Great Patriotic War.

The work depicts a group of running young women with a sporty physique against the background of a Central Russian landscape.

The picture was exhibited in Manchester, Prague, Vienna, China etc. It is kept in the Russian Museum, Saint Petersburg.
