= Vesnin =

Vesnin (Russian: Веснин) is a Russian masculine surname, its feminine counterpart is Vesnina (Russian: Веснина́, pronounced [vʲɪsnʲɪˈna]); it may refer to

- Vesnin brothers, Russian architects:
  - Alexander Vesnin (1883–1959)
  - Leonid Vesnin (1880–1933)
  - Victor Vesnin (1882–1950)
  - 7224 Vesnina, main-belt asteroid named after the brothers
- Elena Vesnina (born 1986), Russian tennis player
