= Narkomtiazhprom Building =

Soviet Union building

Coordinates: 55°45′15″N 37°37′21″E

The Narkomtiazhprom Building (NKTP, Russian: Наркомтяжпром) is a portmanteau for the People's Commissariat of Heavy Industry that was conducting a 1934 architectural design contest for the building of the People's Commissariat of Heavy Industry, constructed in Red Square, Moscow. Notable entrants included Ivan Leonidov, Konstantin Melnikov, Vesnin brothers and Ivan Fomin.

== The site ==
NKTP was supposed to take up the site of historical Kitai-gorod, the territory directly north and east from Red Square. The Square was to be widened (into the site of State Universal Store) and part of Zaryadye. State Historical Museum, Kazan Cathedral, and Lenin Museum (Moscow City Hall) were to be demolished. The building, spanning over 400 meters along the square, would have had its northern facade on Teatralnaya Square (then Sverdlov Square), southern façade on Moscow River, across Balchug Street. Building size was set at 40,000 square meters built-out area, 110,000 square meters usable floor area (comparison figures for contemporary Empire State Building: 8,100 and 200,000 square meters, respectively).

== The entries ==
Contest entries differentiated into classical (including postconstructivist), and avant-garde. A total of 120 entries were collected. Some were worthless, some were made just to fill the list. Most curious of this sort, by F. Karyakin (Red Square façade, plan), settled for no less than six half-scale replicas of Boris Iofan's Palace of Soviets tower. Serious concepts were produced by old Revival school architects and their young followers (class of 1929):

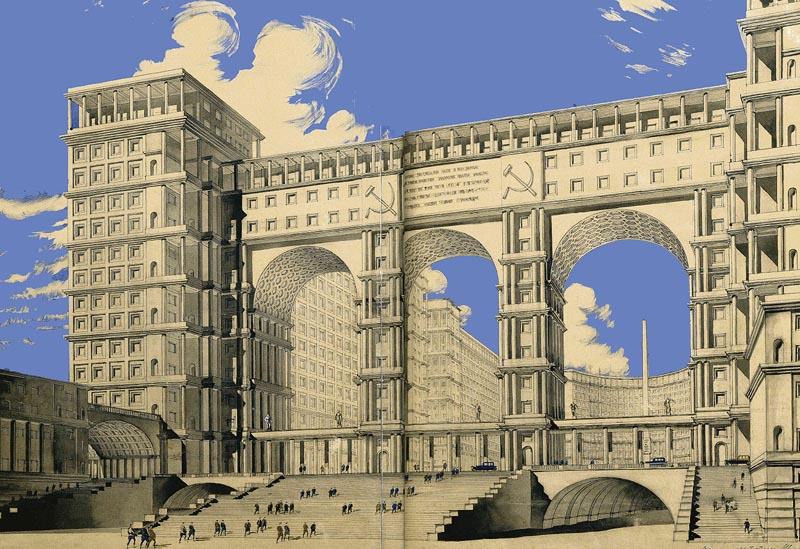
Ivan Fomin, P.V. Abrosimov, M.A. Minkus. This is the shortest, northern facade.

Ivan Fomin limited building height to 12 story (24 story for two towers facing Lenin's Mausoleum) to fit into existing technology limits. Ivan Leonidov's concept, consisting of three lean skyscrapers was far beyond these limits. Constructivist elders Alexander Vesnin and Victor Vesnin produced various concepts:

Note that in 1934 Victor Vesnin became the Chief Architect of Narkomtiazhprom (Ministry of Heavy Industry); Alexander Vesnin and Moisei Ginzburg also worked with this institution throughout the 1930s.

== Reality or Symbolism ==
Whether the state (or Stalin personally) really intended to build this project is not clear. By 1934, feasibility studies for the Palace of Soviets identified the missing technologies that would take years to develop; skyscraper construction in 1934 was out of the question. The cost to relocate numerous government offices from Kitai-gorod would have been enormous, too. Modern theorists speculate that

- the contest was just another attempt to formulate the vector of Stalinist architecture
- or that it was a plot to separate the loyal, neoclassical architects from the stubborn avant-garde followers, and demote the latter.

The 1935 Master plan of Moscow (Генплан 1935) changed the concept, effectively voiding all contest entries. The square was to be widened, as set in 1934 contest terms, but the Narkomtiazhprom site was reduced to Zaryadye only (1/3 of original area). Construction in Zaryadye commenced in 1947 (see Moscow Skyscrapers), and was cancelled again in early 1950s. The site stood vacant for a decade. Rossiya Hotel was completed in 1967 and demolished in 2006-2007.

== See also ==
- Pantheon, Moscow
- Constructivist architecture
- Postconstructivism
- Stalinist architecture
