= Ivan Nikolaev =

Soviet architect (1901–1979)

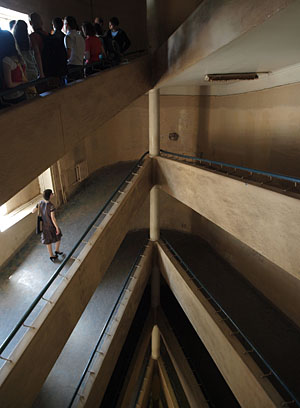
- Main staircase of the Communal House of the Textile Institute, 1929-1931
- Born: Ivan Sergeyevich Nikolaev; July 19, 1901; Voronezh, Russian Empire
- Died: September 22, 1979 (aged 78); Moscow, Soviet Union
- Occupation: Architect
- Buildings: Communal House of the Textile Institute

Ivan Sergeyevich Nikolaev (Russian: Иван Серге́евич Николаев; 19 July 1901 – 22 September 1979) was a Soviet architect and educator, notable for his late 1920s constructivist architecture and later work in industrial architecture.

== Life and career ==
Born in Voronezh, Nikolaev trained at the Moscow State Technical University under Viktor Vesnin and Aleksandr Kuznetsov, graduating in 1925. His work prior to 1928 was generally unnoticed (excluding a brief apprenticeship at the 1923 national agricultural exhibition).

In 1928 Nikolaev designed a residential block in Preobrazhenskoye District of Moscow - three buildings of traditional low-cost architecture shaped as an arrow pointed at the Old Believers' Preobrazhenskoye Cemetery. In 1928-1929 he worked as construction manager, building the modernist campus of Moscow Power Engineering Institute designed by Alexey Kuznetsov; Nikolaev received a credit for this project as one of Kuznetsov's six associates.

In 1929 Nikolaev won a public contest for the Communal House of the Textile Institute - a modern campus for 2000 students. Constrained by cost and space limits, Nikolaev produced the most radical example of a communal house, where student life was subject to nearly military regulations. His ideas of reducing private living space to nothing but a sleeping cubicle without windows (the students had to keep all their earthly possessions in a separate locker room and were not allowed to enter the cubicles at daytime) was too radical even for 1920s Soviet avant-garde, so Nikolaev had to change the plans to allow marginally more breathing space to the residents. The building stands to date, vacant and expecting rehabilitation into a modern campus.

With the advent of Stalinist architecture and a crackdown on independent professional unions (1932) Nikolaev, like Vesnin brothers and other OSA Group architects, switched to industrial architecture and was not involved in high-profile public projects anymore. His better known projects of 1930s-1940s were built for the textile industry, including the 1935 Kayseri Sumerbank factory in Turkey.

Nikolaev wrote a prolific number of textbooks and research books on architecture, notably Architecture of Roman Aqueducts, and was elected as a member of Academy of Architecture in 1956. He became a member of the faculty of Moscow colleges in 1925. Eventually, Nikolaev completely dedicated himself to education, and held the chair of the director of Moscow Architectural Institute from 1958 to 1970. He died in Moscow in 1979.
