= Revolutionary Mass Festivals =

Revolutionary Mass Festivals (in Russian массовые праздники), or Mass Spectacles, were participatory, staged cultural events held in the Soviet Union. They were held during the period of the Russian Civil War following the October Revolution of 1917. Experimental in nature, they united the Leninist ideology of re-education of the masses and the aesthetics of the Russian avant-garde. The revolutionary mass festivals were built upon the tradition of fairs and carnivals, and were part of the subsequently institutionalized public holidays and their official celebration in the Soviet Union. In contrast to these earlier versions of public festivals, the early revolutionary mass festival were often produced ad hoc without a distinct guideline. However, they became crucial events in the active construction of historical myths.

== Pre-revolutionary predecessors ==
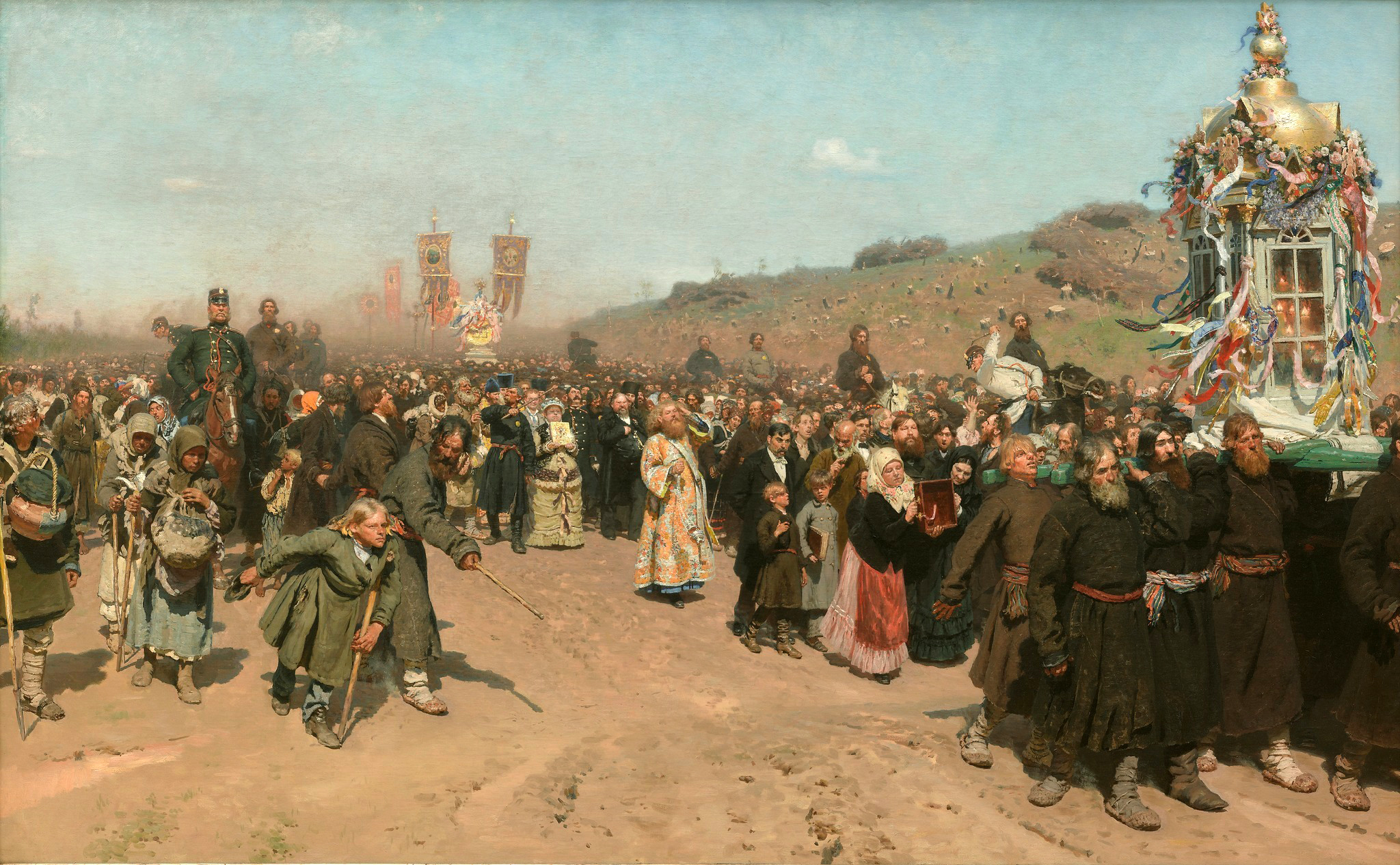
Ilya Repin: Religious Procession in the Kursk Province (1883)

Staged or semi-staged mass festivals have a long history dating as far back as the ancient Saturnalia, medieval carnivals and mystery plays. They were appropriated by the French Revolution, with the first event of its kind being the funeral parade for Voltaire, which Jacques-Louis David organized in 1791. Russia too shared a tradition of public festivals. On one hand, parades were organized by the state on the occasion of coronations and in order to commemorate events of political or military significance, such as the victory over Napoleon in 1812 or bicentennial anniversary of the foundation of Saint Petersburg held in 1903. On the other hand, the Russian Orthodox liturgical calendar included annual religious processions (in Russian крестные ходы). Eventually, strike marches, illegal May Day celebrations and funeral marches for fallen revolutionaries were a central element of the revolutionary movement since the 1890s. The Soviet mass festival draws heavily on these traditions, since they not only commemorate central events of political history but, by representing a new anti-religious ideology, they also assume and replace the spiritual position formerly held by the church.

== Ideological purpose ==
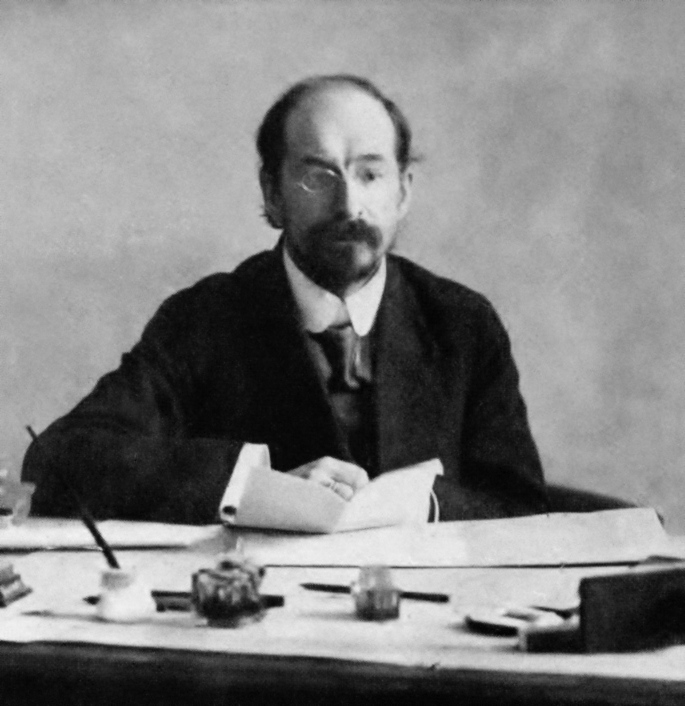
Anatoly Lunacharsky, Soviet Commissar of Enlightenment 1917-1929

One of the problems following the aftermath of the Russian Revolution was that channels of communication between the vanguard revolutionary elite and the masses had to be created. The circulation of print media was limited, as was the overall literacy of the people (around 43% in 1917). Mass Festivals provided a channel for communication, especially as they offered a certain idea of cultural continuity for the people. In charge of the cultural, educational, and propaganda policy after the revolution, Anatoly Lunacharsky acted as the People's Commissar of Enlightenment (Narkompros). With the aim of propagandistic re-education of the masses, Narkompros sought to cooperate with Russian artists from both the World of Art society and the avant-garde. Thus, the constructivist artists Vladimir Tatlin and, later, Alexei Gan were in charge of the Narkompros activities in Moscow.

=== Anatoly Lunacharsky’s vision of the Mass Festival ===
In his article “On the People’s Festivals” (“О народных празднествах,” first in Vestnik Teatra 62/1920), Anatoly Lunacharsky explores the theatrical form and the ideological content of the mass festival.

When organized masses walk in a procession to music, sing in one voice, or complete some great gymnastic exercises and dances - in short, if they hold their own kind of a parade, but this parade is not military in nature but rather saturated by content that expresses the ideological essence, hope, oaths, and all other kinds of the people's emotions - when this is the case, then the remaining un-organized masses, surrounding from all sides the streets and the squares, where the festival takes place, merge with the organized masses. Therefore we can say: the whole nation demonstrates its spirit in front of itself. [...] One must, any case, be cautious not to focus merely on entertainment. To many it seems that collective creation implies a certain spontaneous, independent expression of the will of the masses. Meanwhile, until that time when social life has educated the masses toward a certain peculiar, instinctive compliance with a higher order and rhythm, we cannot expect that a crowd itself could create anything but cheerful noise and a colorful fluctuation of festively dressed people.

— Anatoly Lunacharsky, On the People's Festivals

As Lunacharsky points out in "On the People's Festivals," the traditions of ancient Greek spectacles and David's festivals on the aftermath of the French Revolution informed his notions of Soviet mass festivals within the post-revolutionary Russian context; the festivals' potential for entertainment, serve to activate the masses. For this reason, Lunacharsky encourages the conscious appropriation of music, dance, language, and visual arts. At the same time, he clearly states that entertainment cannot be an end in itself. The festivals have to serve a higher educational purpose.

Here, the opposition between the spontaneity of the people vs. the revolution overlooked by a party elite (one of the central dichotomies of the Russian Revolution) is reflected directly. While the people's spontaneity needs to be triggered, Lunacharsky defends the ideal of deliberate organization even of the spontaneous elements. The mass festivals have to be strictly coordinated. Only by such means will the festivals be able to convey distinct and controllable educational content. Thus, Lunacharsky's approach attempts, through theatrical staging, to combine education and entertainment of the masses under the premises of political propaganda.

== Characteristics of stagings between 1918 and 1920 ==
=== Decorations and “stage” designs ===
The emergence of the post-revolutionary mass festivals is closely linked to the question of the re-configuration of historical memory, as evidenced by monuments in cities all over Russia. Accordingly, the Narkompros issued a decree "On Monuments of the Republic," which called for the immediate dismantling of tsarist monuments. This decree shows, however, that the new monuments should not be mere objects of historicist contemplation but rather designed as parts of a constructive process that harbored in the mass celebrations.

The same commission [a special commission of People's Commissars for Education and others] sought to mobilize artists and organize a broad competition for the design of monuments to celebrate the great days of the Russian Socialist Revolution.

— Decree of the Soviet People's Commissars, On Monuments of the Republic

The first festival to take place was on May Day 1918. In Moscow, the constructivist architects Alexander and Viktor Vesnin designed the decorations for it. In Petrograd, the decorations for the first May Day parade were also commissioned to avant-garde artists, commonly referred to as "futurists." Even at that moment, the potential of abstract art to help bring about the re-education of the masses was considered disputable. Lunacharsky noted in his diary:

Of course I am absolutely certain that the posters will be criticized. After all, it is so easy to criticize the "futurists". In essence all that remains of real Cubism and Futurism here is the precision and the force of general form and the brightness of colour so essential for paintings intended for the open air and for a giant audience with hundreds of thousands of heads.

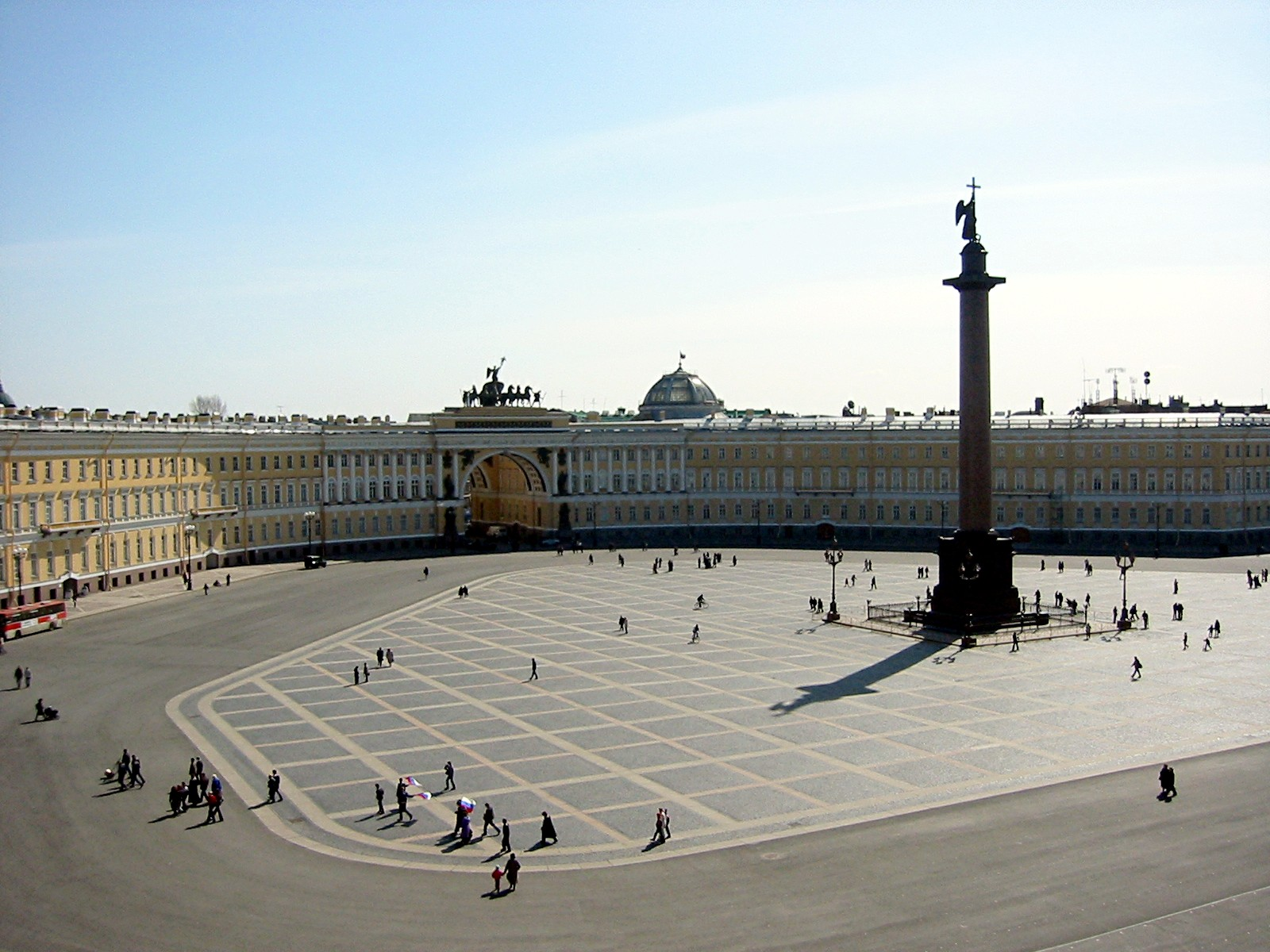
Palace Square (formerly Uritsky Square), Saint Petersburg

The Petersburg Celebrations of the first Anniversary of the Revolution in 1918 were significantly larger than the May Day celebrations. They involved numerous architects and artists in 85 separate projects across the city. The most prominent of these projects were the decorations for the Palace Square, then called Uritsky Square, by the cubist painter Natan Altman. In his designs he contrasted the neoclassical architectural ensemble of the square with abstract constructions that were intended to represent the political new order. The conflict between new and old was thereby visualized and allowed the spectator to physically experience it within the city space. For Altman, art gains its meaning structurally, through collective interaction only. This is the constitutive feature of proletarian art, which accounts for the political relevance of his decorations. However, this approach does not necessarily allow for an obligatory political content of art, which is attacked by the majority of later Soviet criticism of the avant-garde.

Later celebrations, especially Nikolai Evreinov's "Storming of the Winter Palace" of 1920, put stronger emphasis on the actual acting rather than on the decorations. The last extensive project of decorations was planned for the celebrations commemorating the Third International in 1921 by the constructivists Alexander Vesnin and Liubov Popova. It was supposed to be large-scale open air installation consisting of a model of a “Fortress of Capitalism” and the “Communist Future City,” connected by ties and banners that were to be held up by airships. The envisioned site for this installation was the Khodinka field in northern Moscow. The site was meant to serve as the stage for a historical mass spectacle restaging the struggle of the proletarian revolution. However, Vesnin's and Popova's plans were not realized which is indicative of the underlying conflict between avant-garde aesthetics and Marxist ideology.

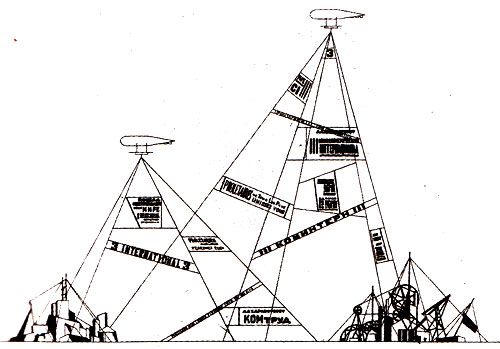
Alexander Vesnin/Liubov Popova: Design for a Mass Spectacle in Honor of the Third Comintern Congress

=== Actors and spectators ===
The last of the great mass spectacles was Nikolai Evreinov's “Storming of the Winter Palace” and it was the largest in terms of involved actors and spectators. It was performed for the third anniversary of the October Revolution in 1920, when it was staged directly on the Palace Square and in the Winter Palace in Petrograd. The battleship Aurora, whose shot set off the revolutionary events in 1917, again gave the starting signal. Nikolai Evreinov directed a mass of 8,000 performers, many of whom were amateurs recruited from the army. The event also marks a turning point, because, in contrast to prior celebrations, it was meticulously orchestrated – despite its massive number of participants and spectators, from whom the event demanded strict discipline in order not to turn into mere chaos. The action was centered around the two confronting parties of the revolution, which were stationed on two platforms – a "red" platform representing the proletariat, and a "white" platform representing Kerensky's provisional government and the bourgeoisie. It is documented that 2,685 participants were on the "white" platform, including 125 ballet dancers, and 100 circus artists.

The event in 1920 was attended by a large number of spectators - according to estimates around 100,000. The borders between spectatorship and acting were not quite clear, since playing a role in the staging ultimately also meant experiencing the staging as such. Even though Evreinov used light and sound effects, the audience's perception of actual action beyond the impression of the overwhelmingness of the event was, however, most likely limited. It is a characteristic feature of the revolutionary mass spectacles that, unlike traditional theatrical stagings, they conveyed subjective experience rather than a total experience of the events in their entirety.

=== Reception and cultural impact ===
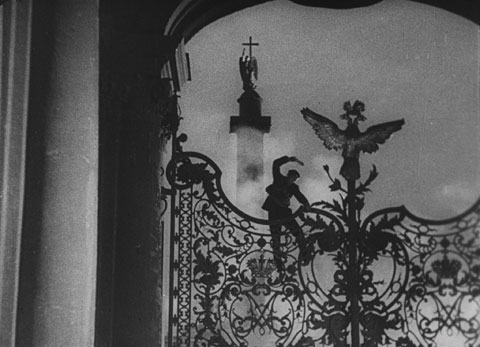
Storming of the Winter Palace: Still from Sergei Eisenstein's October: Ten Days That Shook the World, 1928

The early mass celebrations were permeated by an air of carnivalesque joy and the people's notion of finally achieved freedom. This may appear highly paradoxical in the midst of the violence and economic hardship that the revolution had brought about. The participatory spectatorship at the “Storming of the Winter Palace” is the most vivid example of how the mass spectacle created historical myth, and replaced the "reality" of the significantly less dramatic events of the 1917 revolution with a more impressive memory. Accordingly, for his 1928 movie October: Ten Days That Shook the World, Sergei Eisenstein chose to present Evreinov's re-enactment of the 1917 storming of the Winter Palace.

In her analysis of the revolutionary mass spectacle, Susan Buck-Morss discusses the dual nature of these stagings and their complicated relationship to state power. They perpetuate a historical past into the present and it is not clear whether the power over this past actually lies in the hands of the masses or whether, it is instead, orchestrated by the state, which paradoxically achieved its power through those very revolutionary actions. In re-staging the revolution, the state seeks confirmation of this power, but at the same time the stagings inevitably lack the liberating character of a spontaneous revolution. This inherent ambivalence of the revolutionary mass festivals explains why, as a genre, they were later eschewed in favor of the more uniform annual Soviet holidays such as May Day, the anniversary of the Revolution, and - after World War II - Victory Day.

== List of Mass Festivals ==
Year	Name	Author
1918	Mystery Buff	Mayakovsky/Meyerhold
1919	Play of the Third International	Red Army Theater Workshop
1920	Mystery of Freed Labor	Yury Annenkov/Alexander Kugel
1920	The Blockade of Russia	
1920	In Favor of a World Commune	
1920	The Storming of the Winter Palace	Nikolai Evreinov
