= School 518 =

Moscow area high school

Coordinates: 55°44′37″N 37°38′14″E

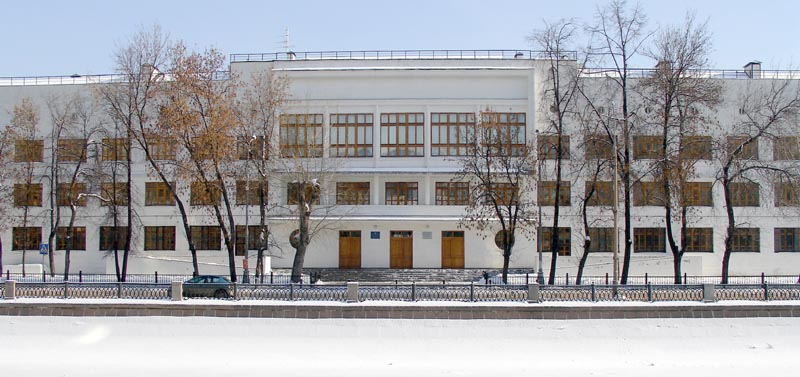
- Interactive map of the School 518 area

General information
- Architectural style: Postconstructivism
- Location: Moscow, Russia
- Construction started: 1933
- Completed: 1935

Technical details
- Structural system: Masonry

Design and construction
- Architect: Ivan Andreevich Zvezdin

School 518 is a high school in the historical Balchug area of Moscow, Russia. Designed by Ivan Zvezdin and completed in 1935, it is the only listed postconstructivist memorial building in the city. It was reconstructed between 1999 and 2003 to meet modern safety standards and Zvezdin's original design, both externally and internally.

== Site ==
The school was built on a 2.9 hectare waterfront lot between Sadovnicheskaya Street and Vodootvodny Canal. This area, near Bolshoy Ustinsky Bridge, underwent significant construction in the 1930s. The bridge and adjacent Textile Institute were completed in 1938. Further east, the historical Sadovniki area retained its 19th-century mix of residential blocks, military depots and factories.

== Architecture ==
Between 1932 and 1936, Soviet architects began to transition from the Constructivism of the 1920s to Stalinist architecture. Two groups of architects - constructivists and neoclassicists - converged on the same transitional style, known as postconstructivism (or simply early Stalinism) and featuring classical shapes without classical detail; in which the architects stopped experimenting with shapes. However, they remained reluctant to accept classical order. Instead, they invented their own order, in which they combined large window surfaces with slim, capital-less supporting columns.

School 518, for example, has such constructivist features as large glass panes and circular top floor windows. It also has a portico of slim white columns supporting the protruding third-floor hall, and is perfectly symmetrical.

Technologically, it was built of man-made lime and cinder blocks, with wooden ceilings, partitions and roof trusses. With a gross volume of 18,500 cubic meters, it has nearly twice more volume per student than the 1935 standard (30.8 vs. 16.5 cubic meters per student).

== History ==
Zvezdin designed a so-called Moscow Suburban School (Подмосковная школа) for 600 students, an experimental institution with a main school hall, gym, stadium and workshops. By 1935, the age of experimentation was over, and the main building opened as two regular high schools - No. 518 for boys and No. 519 for girls. Other buildings were never completed; a small gym was attached in 1950s. The main building was only partially completed. It had open-air terraces but no provisions for open-air classes, and the rear wall was coarsely finished. During World War II the school was converted to a military hospital.

== Reconstruction ==
By 1996, the cinder and wood structure was literally falling apart, and demolition was imminent. Parents and preservationists, led by Selim Khan-Magomedov, managed to list the school on the national register of memorial buildings. Thus, it became the only listed postconstructivist building in Moscow. This memorial status allowed it to receive city funding for reconstruction of the protected interiors and southern facade. The reconstructions between 1999 and 2003 also expanded the rear facade, adding the fourth floor with circular windows. Single-story rear terraces were built out to complete the building's 4-story height. Additionally, the small gym was torn down and replaced with a larger, separate structure. Historical interiors were rebuilt to 1935 drawings. Unlike other recently rebuilt constructivist buildings (i.e. Mostorg by Vesnin brothers), School 518 retains its original function and interiors.

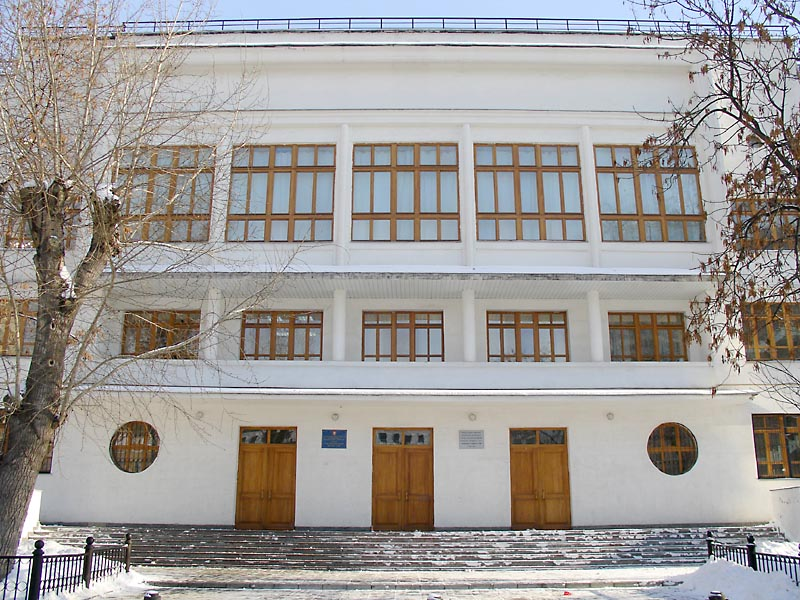
Main entrance

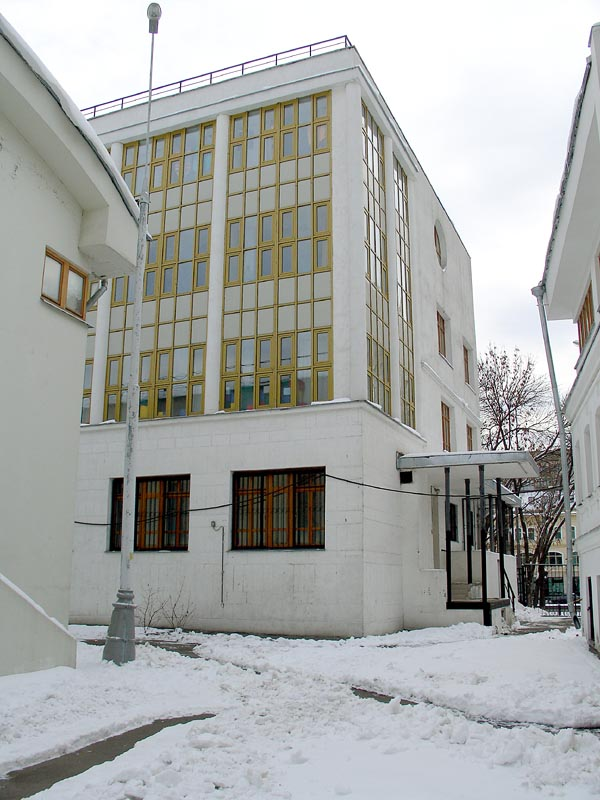
Built-out rear facade

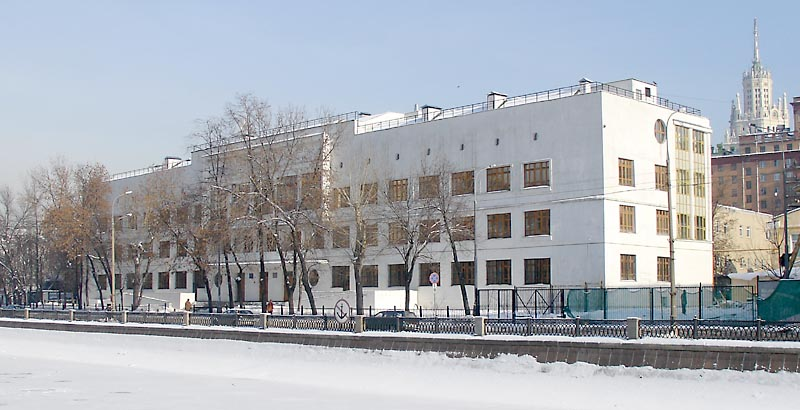
No parking for boats

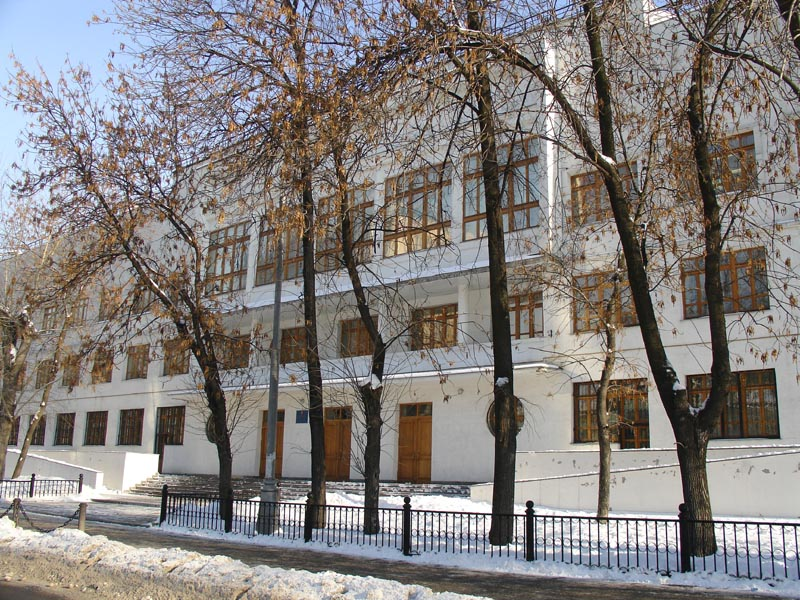
Main entrance, side view

== See also ==
- Selim Khan-Magomedov, "Pioneers of Soviet Architecture: The Search for New Solutions in the 1920s and 1930s", 1986, Thames and Hudson Ltd, ISBN 978-0-500-34102-5.
- Maria Gough, "The Artist as Producer: Russian Constructivism in Revolution", 2005, University of California Press, ISBN 978-0-520-22618-0.
