= Postconstructivism =

1930s style of Soviet architecture

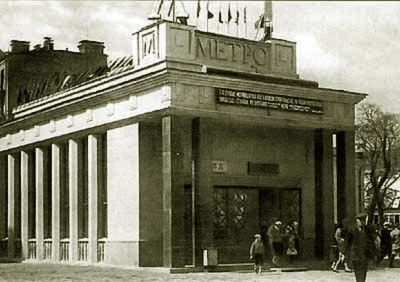
Moscow, Park Kultury, Entrance pavilion, by G.T.Krutikov, V.S.Popov, 1935, demolished 1949. Note the slim, square columns without capitals.

Postconstructivism was a transitional architectural style that existed in the Soviet Union in the 1930s, typical of early Stalinist architecture before World War II. The term postconstructivism was coined by Selim Khan-Magomedov, a historian of architecture, to describe the product of avant-garde artists' migration to Stalinist neoclassicism. Khan-Magomedov identified postconstructivism with 1932–1936, but the long construction time and vast size of the country extended the period to 1941.

Existence of this style is evident, but Khan-Magomedov's explanation of its evolution as a natural process inside the architectural community, rather than as a result of political direction by the Party and State, is strongly disputed.

== Khan-Magomedov's viewpoint ==
This section is based on Khan-Magomedov's Soviet avant-garde architecture, vol.1, "Avant-garde to postconstructivism and beyond"

=== Background ===
In 1932–1933, during the Palace of Soviets contest, the State sent a clear message to architects that the age of experiment was over and the new buildings must follow the classical canon. At this time, the architectural profession was divided into three generations:

- Mature Neoclassical architects (most of them in their fifties and sixties), like Ivan Fomin, Alexey Shchusev and Ivan Zholtovsky. Excellent education and experience led them to success in any style – Art Nouveau, Neoclassicism and Constructivism.
- A younger, diverse avant-garde movement (itself divided into rationalists and constructivists). With the exception of the Vesnin brothers, few constructivists had acquired professional experience before World War I; the war, Revolution of 1917 and Civil war halted any new construction for a decade (1914–1926). In 1927–1929, former theorists Nikolai Ladovsky, Moisei Ginzburg, Ilya Golosov stepped aside from public discussions and switched to practical building and urban planning. By 1933, they had not more than seven years of practice and were just entering their own age of maturity.
- Finally, the vocal students of the 'Proletarian School', members of VOPRA: the "class of 1929" (Arkady Mordvinov, Karo Alabyan). Trained by Constructivist leaders in a style they dubbed "sterile avant-garde," they were completely unaware of the classical legacy and had no practical experience. They compensated for this with left-wing political assaults and accusations, in particular a campaign against Ivan Leonidov.

=== Birth of a style ===
According to Khan-Magomedov, two forerunners of the style were Ivan Fomin and Ilya Golosov. They converged on the same form from opposite directions – neoclassicism and constructivism. Fomin's concept, easily formulated, erected in steel and granite in Moscow (Dynamo Building), was well understood even by the inexperienced youth. "The youth instinctively followed those who managed to declare their stance clearly. The youth believed that this period is a self-sufficient cultural stage, not a transition to something else". In 1933–34, Golosov publicly disposed of the avant-garde. He returned to Neoclassicism, trying to avoid direct citations from the past. For example, he used square columns instead of traditional, round ones. Square, lean columns without capitals became a trademark feature of the emerging style. Golosov's entries in public design contests exposed his style to numerous followers.

Ivan Fomin and Ilya Golosov. Original concepts (never materialized):

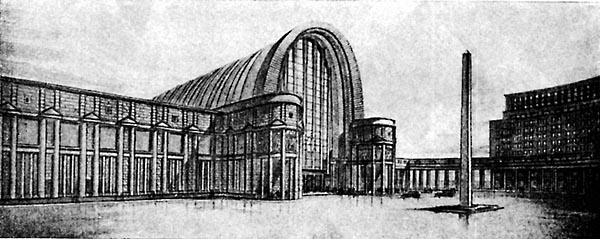
Ivan Fomin. Kursky Rail Terminal, 1933

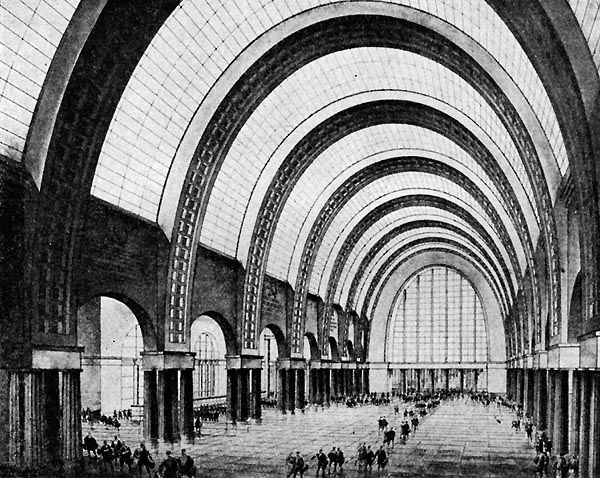
Ivan Fomin. Kursky Rail Terminal, 1933

=== Style defined ===
Khan-Magomedov defined postconstructivism as "neoclassical shapes without neoclassical detailing". Golosov and his followers deliberately replaced the proven historical details (columns, capitals, friezes, and cornices) with their inventions – to differentiate themselves from pure Revivalists. The main volumes follow the classical rules and usually are perfectly symmetrical.

Ilya Golosov and Vladimir Vladimirov. Apartment buildings in Moscow

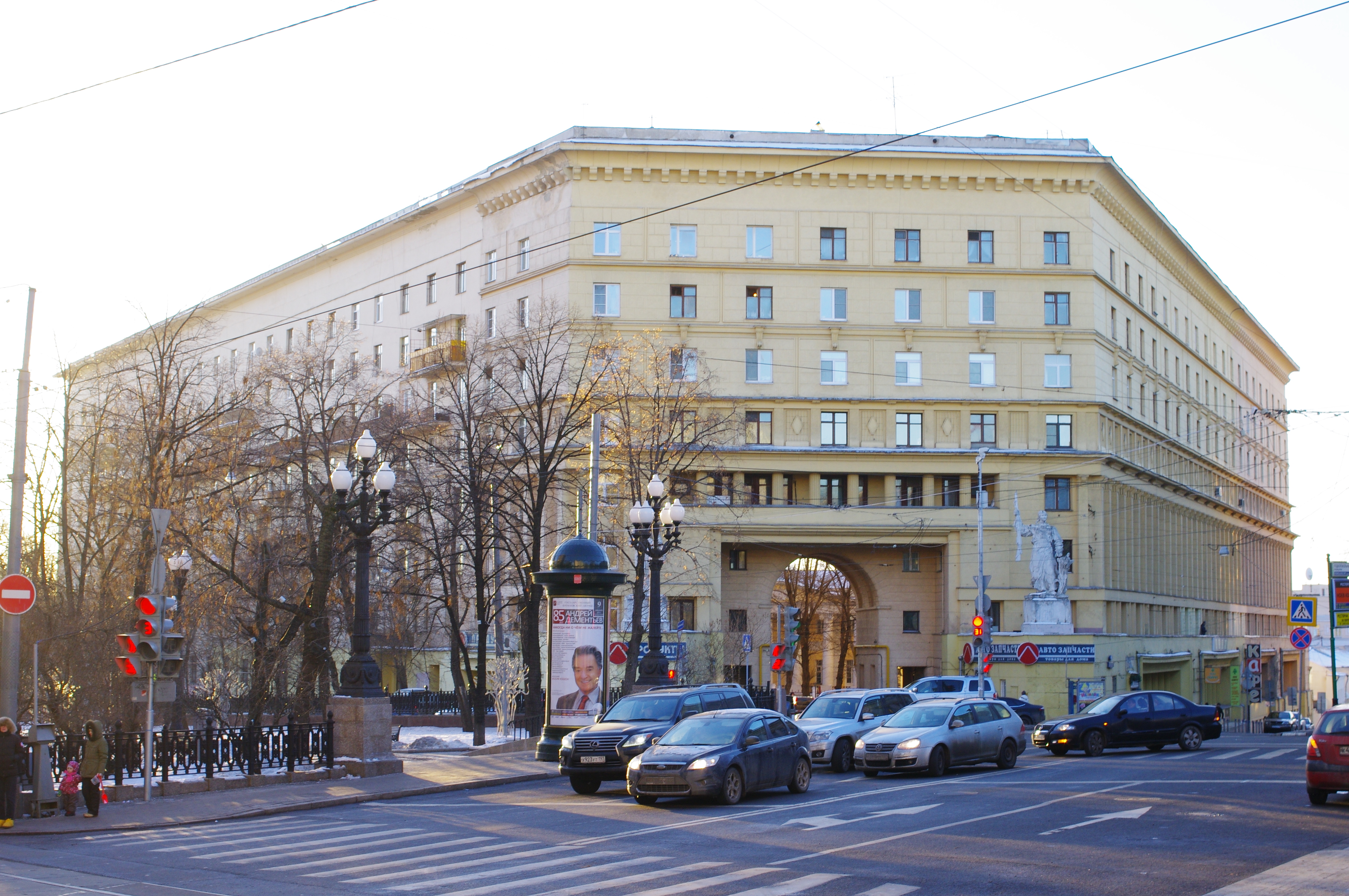
Ilya Golosov. Yauzsky, 2, 1936–1941

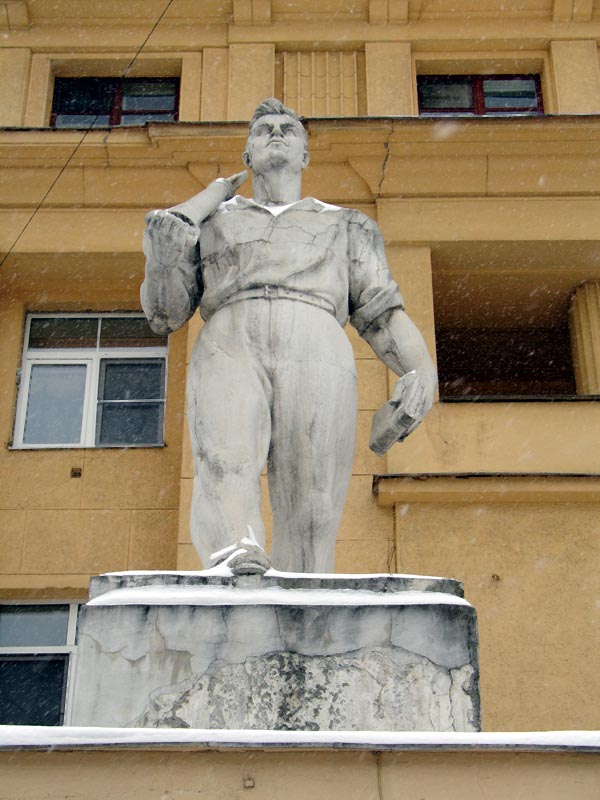
Ilya Golosov. Yauzsky, 2, fragment

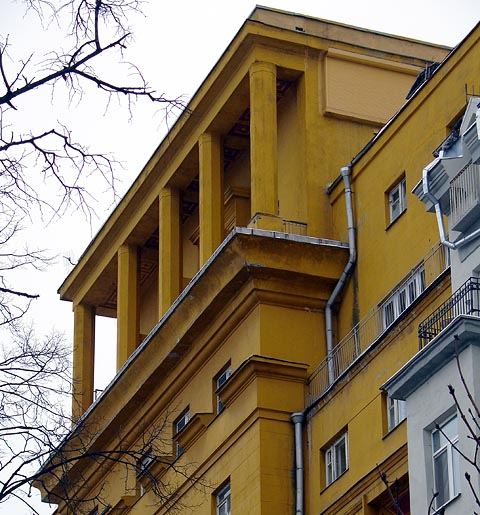
Vladimirov. Aviazhilstroy, Patriarshy Ponds, Penthouse with octagonal columns

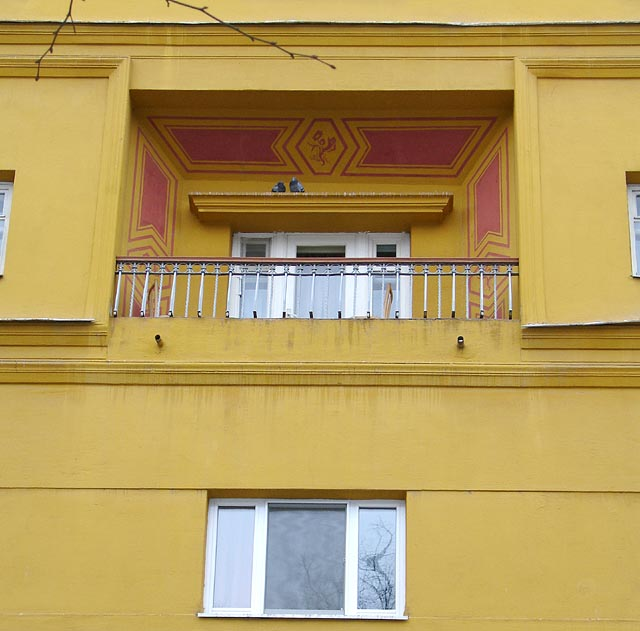
Vladimirov. Aviazhilstroy, Patriarshy Ponds, Balcony

=== Recognition ===
Postconstructivism benefited from a natural reaction against both the avant-garde and the eclectics of the past. It was perceived as new, and at the same time allowed grand buildings that were to the taste of provincial elite. Another benefit in a time of total rationing was that, unlike Constructivism, the new style minimized use of steel and cement, turning back to primitive masonry with wooden floors and partitions. This helps explain the spread of Postconstructivism in the 1930s.

Evolution – Constructivism to Postconstructivism to Stalinism (Moscow)

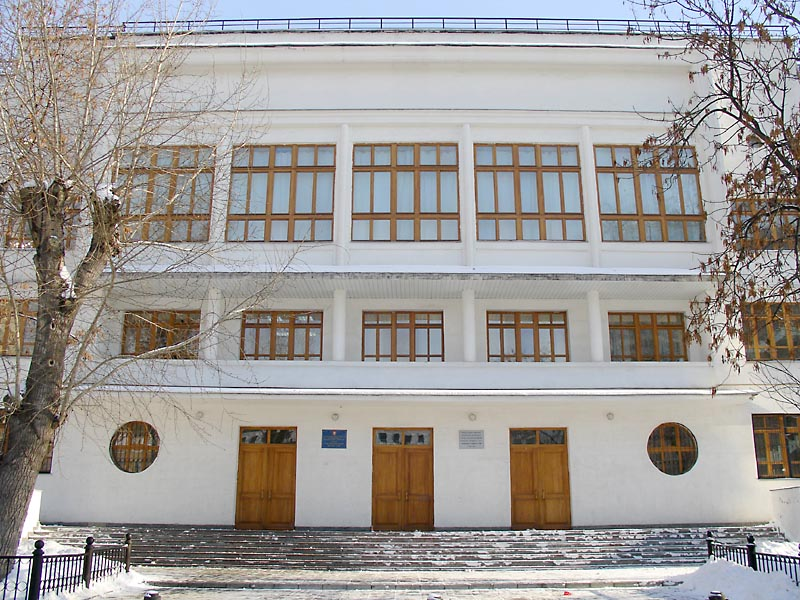
School 518 by Ivan Zvezdin, 1933–35

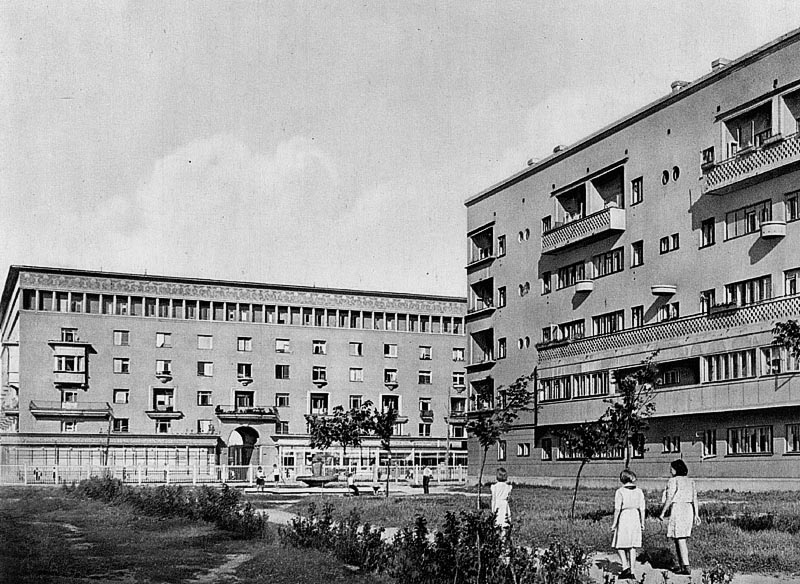
Schosse Entuziastov housing by Guryev-Gurevich and Zaltsmann, 1935–36

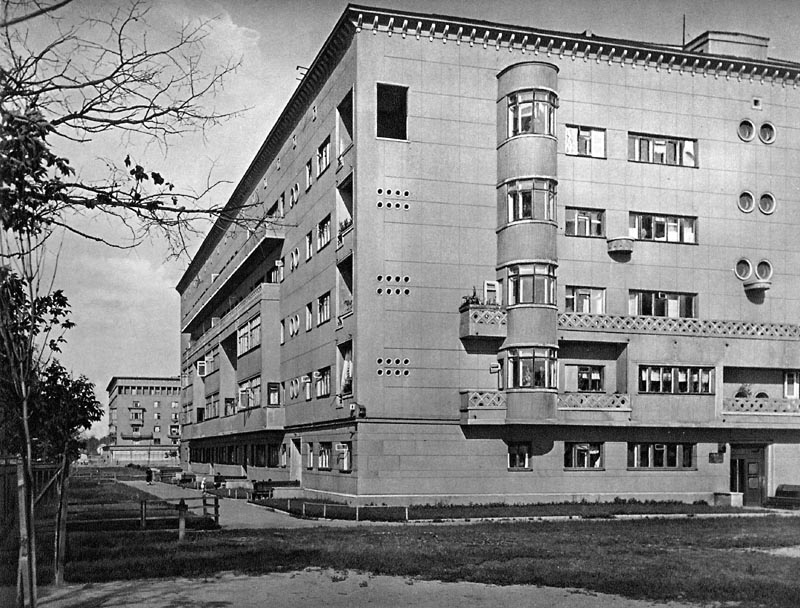
Schosse Entuziastov housing by Guryev-Gurevich and Zaltsmann, 1935–36

Leningrad

Sverdlovsk and Kuibyshev

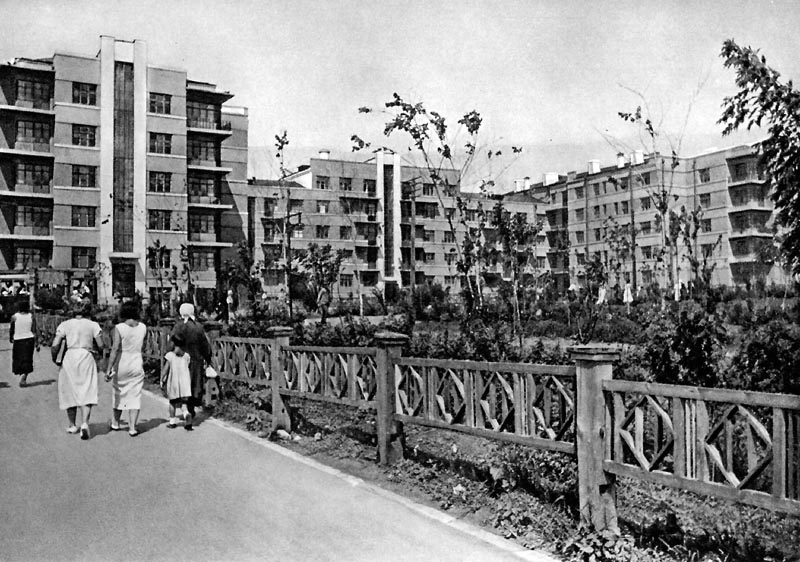
Kuibyshev housing, by Matveyev and Bosim, 1936

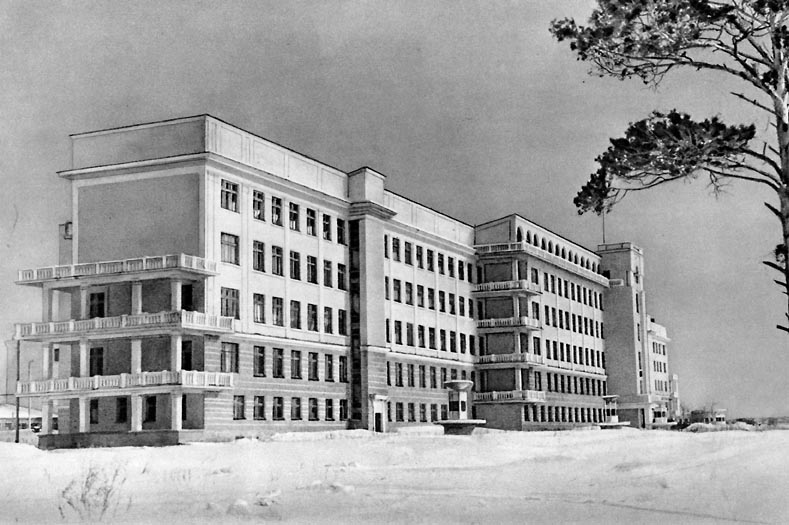
Sverdlovk, hospital, by Yugov, 1936–39

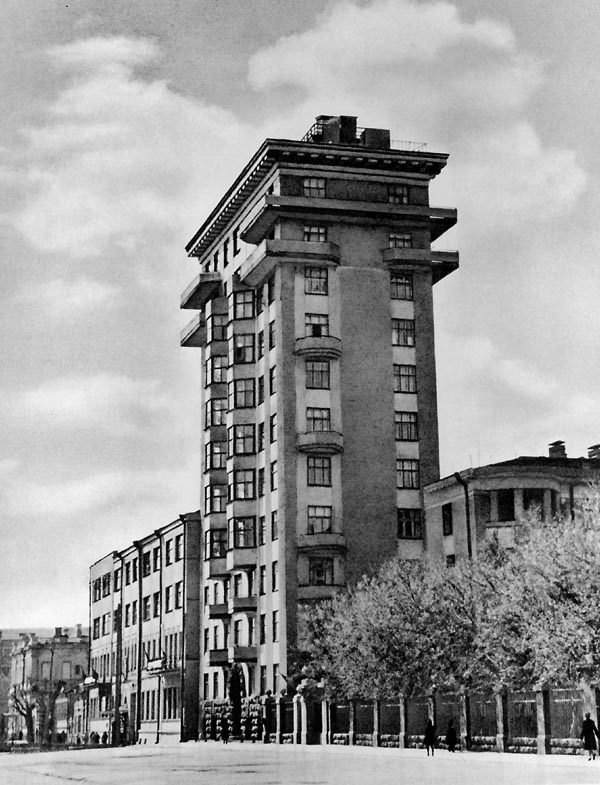
Sverdlovsk, 1932 tower

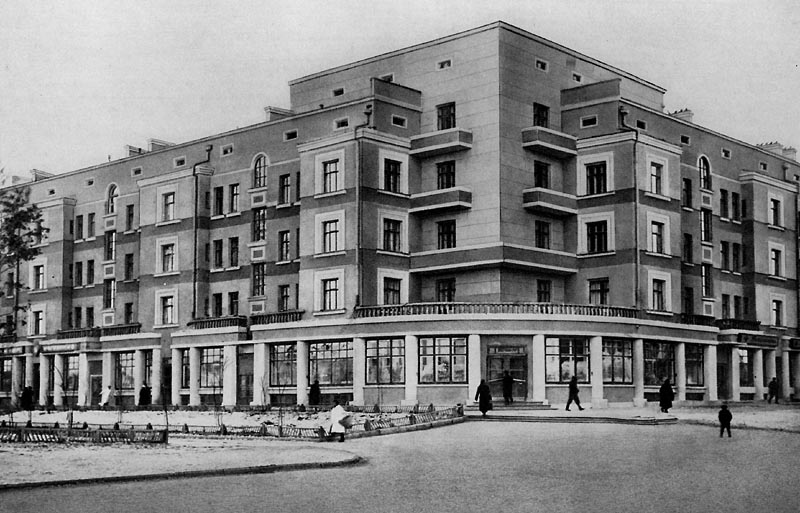
Sverdlovsk, housing by Oransky, 1936

=== Demise ===
By 1936, the left-wing "class of 1929" and younger (Mordvinov, Alabyan) had gained some practical experience. These architects completely lacked the classical training of older Constructivists; lack of skill prevented them from inventing their own incarnation of classical legacy; all they could do was copying. As a result, they buried their avantgarde teachers and proceeded straight to pure neoclassicism. They could not stop at postconstructivism because they – unlike Golosov or Fomin – could not innovate. Meanwhile, Fomin died in 1936, and Golosov was aging physically, clearing the road for the young.

Another group of young architects, seeking academic training, joined the workshops of Zholtovsky and other old neoclassicists. They, too, skipped over postconstructivism – straight to the Stalinist canon. Their old mentors were still active and enjoyed the support of the State. There was no need for inventing new shapes or styling anymore. Postconstructivist projects dragged on for a few more years, but World War II finally sealed the fate of this style.

== Criticism of Khan-Magomedov's viewpoint ==
=== Role of state ===
Authors like Dmitry Khmelnitsky appreciate Khan-Magomedov's studies of the 1920s and 1930s, but completely disagree with him on the origins and evolution of early Stalinist architecture and the demise of Constructivism.

Khan-Magomedov barely mentions the role of State (or Joseph Stalin personally) in those events, presenting the demise of avant-garde as a natural evolution within the professional community. He admits that the profession was manipulated by the "class of 1929" youth, but does not study the forces that shaped and directed their assaults. Not a word on Stalin's personal influence, not a word on rising terror. Khan-Magovedov discusses the 1929–1931 political assaults by VOPRA at length, but fails to mention that they were part of an all-out national campaign. As Khmelnitsky summarized it, "Postconstructivism was born by terror. The very term is misleading. Traces of the Constructivist style in the Postconstructivism of the 1930s are a sign of indecision, not tradition. They banned constructivism, but didn't explain what to do; the result is an architectural pathology. Comparison with European parallels is useless. There were no European parallels, even Nazi architecture does not come close".

=== Art Deco factor ===
Postconstructivism merged closely with Soviet adaptations of Art Deco. Some examples of this style, like the 1934 Lenin Library by Vladimir Shchuko, may be mistaken for Postconstructivism. In fact, Schuko was a seasoned Neoclassicist and the Library was his attempt to differentiate into proletarian classic with Art Deco tools. The situation inside the professional community was even more diverse than Khan-Magomedov's picture. Vladimirov's apartment block featured above is usually classified as an Art Deco adaptation, too.

== Present day ==
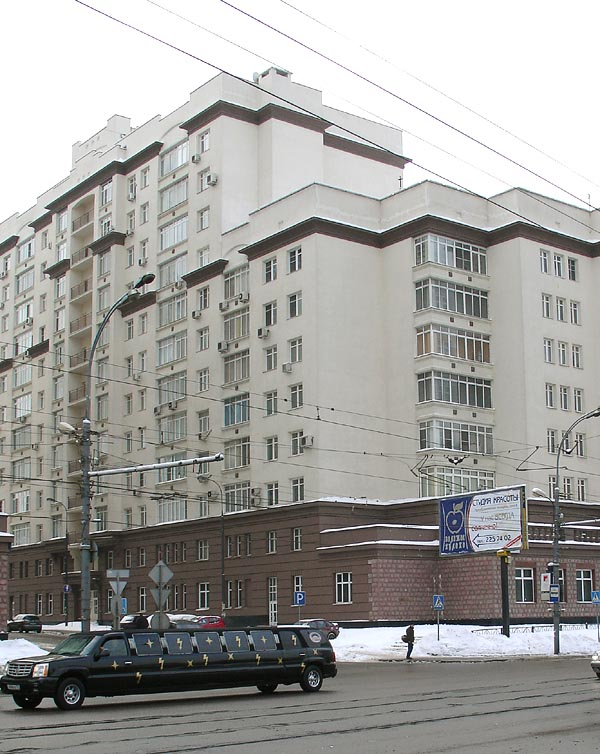
Preobrazhenskaya Zastava, 2002–2005, Moscow

=== Public awareness and preservation ===
The general public is seldom aware of the concept of postconstructivism. Real estate agents classify these buildings as early stalinka, and that's how they are perceived by the public. In Moscow, such buildings are gradually torn down or completely rebuilt (see facadism); demolition of postconstructivist buildings, with few exceptions, goes unnoticed even within the preservationist community. One recently lost example was A.A. Samoilov's building on Novy Arbat in Moscow, torn down in 2006.

=== Safety hazards ===
The buildings of the 1920s–1930s were built using primitive technologies (masonry, wet stucco, wooden ceilings and partitions), low-grade materials and a low-grade workforce. Poor initial quality and inadequate maintenance led to rapid decay. Excluding a few well-maintained, high-class apartment buildings, early stalinka are unsafe. February 10, 1999, a fire in Samara police department, built 1936, killed 57 men and women. On February 13, 2006, Panteleimon Golosov's Constructivist Pravda Building burnt down, killing one person and injuring four.

=== Reconstruction ===
Proper reconstruction of Constructivist or early stalinka buildings is challenging. The structures are weak, and often require complete demolition. A notable example is School 518 (Balchug, Moscow), designed in 1933 by Ivan Zvezdin (1899–1979) and completed in 1935. Praised by Khan-Magomedov, the only Postconstructivist building entered on the national monument register, the school was reconstructed in 2001 to modern safety standards. Most of load-bearing walls and all 1935 interiors were completely rebuilt from scratch.

=== Revival ===
New postconstuctivist or early stalinka buildings are rare. Preobrazhenskaya Zastava (Преображенская Застава) mixed-use project (two blocks, 308 apartments and retail stores) was completed in 2002–2005. Unusually for present-day Moscow, it actually looks like a period piece, not a cheap modern replica. There are no trademark square columns or slim porticos, yet it is the best attempt to recreate a style of the 1930s.

On a smaller scale, Russian architectural firms design country houses in true postconstructivist shape.

== See also ==
- School 518
- Russian Revival architecture
- Stalinka
