= Communal House of the Textile Institute =

Constructivist building in Moscow, Russia

Coordinates: 55°42′40″N 37°35′45″E

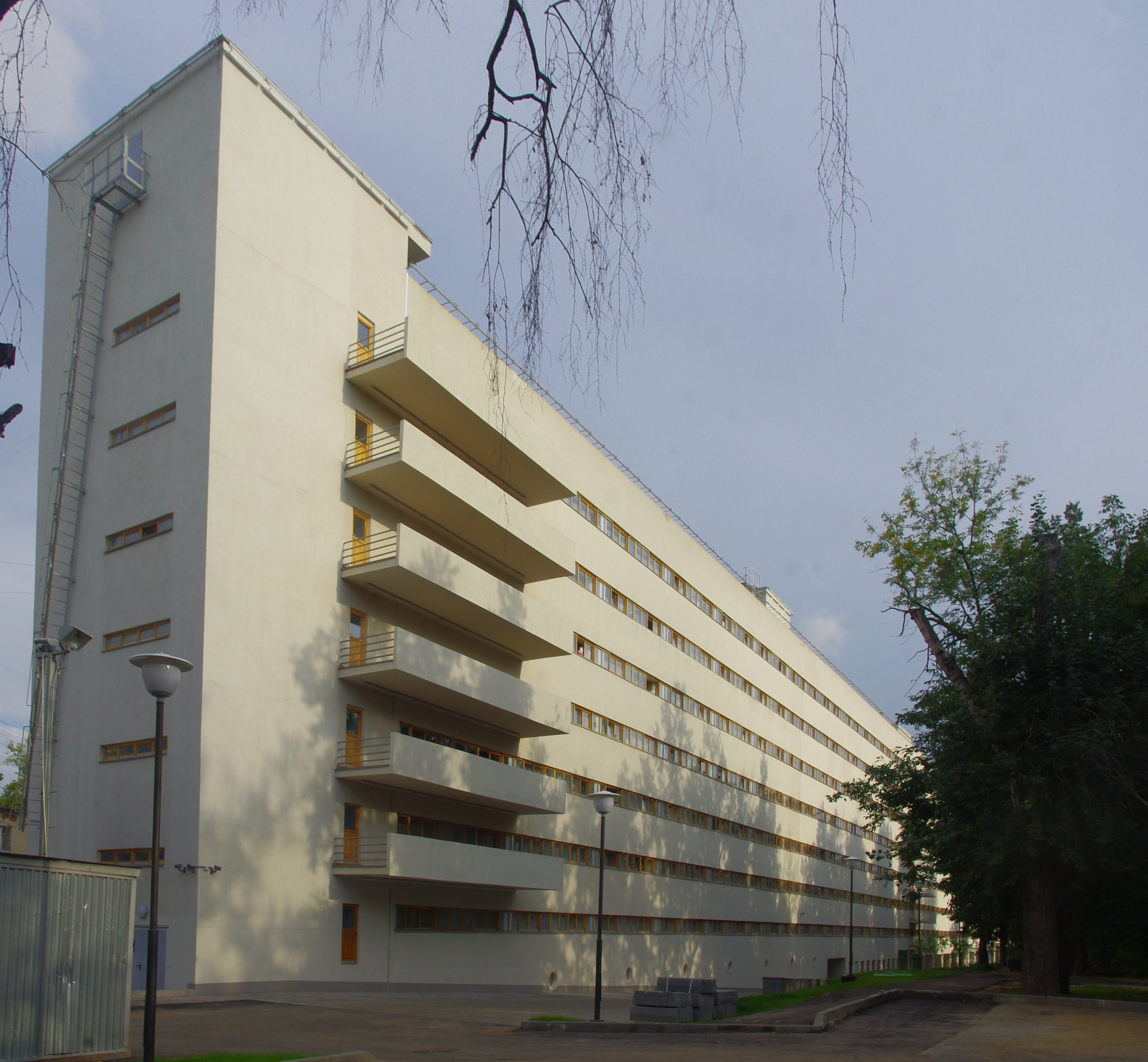
Dormitory wing in 2013

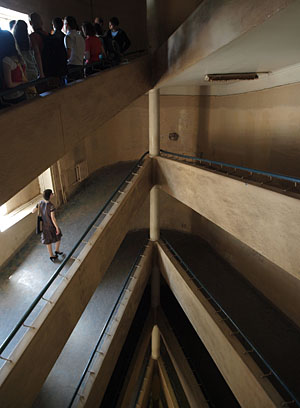
Staircase of the public services building

Communal House of the Textile Institute (also known simply as Nikolaev's House) is a constructivist architecture landmark located in the Donskoy District of Moscow, Russia. The building, designed by Ivan Nikolaev to accommodate 2000 students, was erected in 1929-1931 and functioned as a student dormitory until 1996. After WWII it became a dormitory for the Moscow Institute of Steel and Alloys, which with Federal funding restored the building to its original appearance while upgrading the facilities between 2013 and 2017.

== Design ==
The Communal House of the Moscow Textile Institute became the first solo project for 28-year-old Ivan Nikolaev of the OSA Group; the contract awarded to him was a part of a larger project that included three student campuses in (then) remote areas of Moscow. The contract specification defined a modest maximum construction cost and building volume (50 cubic metres) per student.

Nikolaev's principal design rule was a strict physical separation of common study space, public services (with cafeteria, showers and storage rooms) and the living space. Thus the building was H-shaped: a public services block connected a 200-metre long, 8-storey dormitory with a 3-story study block. Since all the students' possessions - from textbooks to day clothing - had to be stored in the lockers of the public services block, Nikolaev reduced dormitory rooms to sleeping space only. In the first design, a standard sleeping cabin for two had a very small area, 2×2 metres, but 3.2 metres tall, with no windows. Nikolaev attempted to compensate for the shortage of space with elaborate ventilation system. This proposal seemed too radical even for the Soviet avant-garde, and the cabins were increased to 2.7×2.3 metres with proper windows.

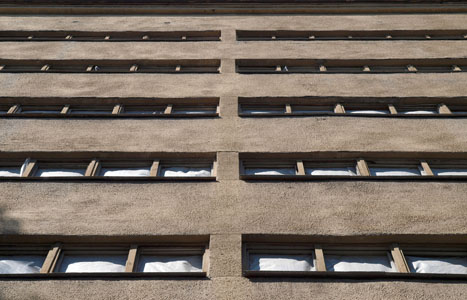
Windows of the dormitory building

These windows ran the full length of a 200-metre building - narrow continuous bands of glass without apparent structural support; they were only 90 cm high (110 cm after the 1968 reconstruction). The residential block relied on a steel frame structure. Initially Nikolaev designed all load-bearing in steel, but due to metal rationing he eventually replaced internal floor supports with wooden girders. The building had elevators, but they were reserved for cargo deliveries only. Instead, the students had to use three spacious staircases - two in the living block and one in the public services building. The latter had an unusual triangular shape, with smooth ramps instead of stairs, as in contemporaneous work by Le Corbusier. These staircases are sometimes compared to the spiral ramp of the Guggenheim Museum in New York City.

Nikolaev thought the lives of the students should be regulated in a nearly military communal fashion. After a common wake-up call all the students proceeded to common physical exercise areas (either a gym in winter or an open area in summer); at this moment the residential block was to be locked until late evening. After exercise, the students took a shower and dressed up in the public service locker rooms; after a breakfast in the canteen they followed their college schedule - either in off-site auditoriums or in the study block facilities. Nikolaev suggested injecting ozone into ventilation ducts at night and even considered sedating students to ensure they all fall asleep in due time (Russian: "не исключена возможность усыпляющих добавок", "do not rule out the feasibility of sleepening additives"). Except for centralized sedation, this paramilitary order was actually maintained in the first years of operation, but later the regulations were eased up.

== Decay and rehabilitation ==
In 1941 the Textile Institute faculty was evacuated and its classes dissolved; the vacant campus was used by the military. After World War II the campus was taken over by the Moscow Institute of Steel and Alloys; students that returned in 1945 found the building heavily infested by bedbugs. Although contemporary architects regard the initial construction quality of the building as quite good for its period, by the 1960s it was falling apart. In 1968 it was renovated by Yakov Belopolsky under Nikolaev's supervision. The project took care of real-world student needs but was constrained by the existing structure and costs. For example, common toilet rooms located in the extremities of a 200-meter long building were expanded with shower rooms. However, there were still only two such rooms on each floor, and the students living in the center of the building still had to run a hundred meters there and another hundred back. The living cubicles were marginally enlarged at the expense of corridors and acquired larger windows; the ventilation system was, on the contrary, downgraded to less demanding standards.

In the next three decades the building fell into disrepair again. It lost the canopy over the main entrance in the 1980s and the wraparound balconies were torn down in 2006 for safety reasons. The living block was shut down in 1996; all wooden ceilings and partitions inside it were eventually torn down, exposing the steel frame inside an empty concrete shell. The campus nominally still belongs to the Institute of Steel and Alloys, but the space of the former study and public services blocks is leased piecemeal to unrelated organizations. Architectural professionals and the general public were well aware of the poor state of the landmark, partly because it is located near the Moscow Architectural Institute dormitory and so became a regular subject of academic studies.

A new rehabilitation plan was approved in 2007 with an estimated cost of 600 million roubles (25 million US dollars). According to this plan, the rooms would be enlarged to at least 11 (single student) or 17 (double) square meters, with individual showers and toilets. The study block will be renovated back to the original plans and functions. As of March 2008, the rehabilitation is being financed through a specially appropriated federal budget fund. In 2013 the restoration of the dormitory block was completed.

By 2017 the renovations had been completed. As of 2019, the public services wing houses a canteen, MISiS research labs, a lecture hall and exhibition space.
