= Alexander Vesnin =

Soviet architect (1883–1959)

- Photo by Alexander Rodchenko, 1924 (fragment)
- Born: 28 May 1883; Yuryevets, Kostroma Governorate, Russian Empire
- Died: 7 September 1959 (aged 76); Moscow, Russian SFSR, Soviet Union
- Education: Institute of Civil Engineers, Saint Petersburg
- Occupation: Architect
- Practice: Vesnin brothers
- Buildings: Dnieper Hydroelectric Station; ZiL Palace of Culture

Alexander Aleksandrovich Vesnin (Russian: Александр Александрович Веснин; 28 May 1883 – 7 September 1959), together with his brothers Leonid and Viktor, was a leading light of Constructivist architecture. He is best known for his meticulous perspectival drawings such as Leningrad Pravda of 1924.

In addition to being an architect, he was a theatre designer and painter, frequently working with Lyubov Popova on designs for workers' festivals, and for the theatre of Tairov. He was one of the exhibitors in the pioneering Constructivist exhibition 5×5=25 in 1921. He was the head, along with Moisei Ginzburg, of the Constructivist OSA Group. Among the completed buildings designed by the Vesnin brothers in the later 1920s were department stores, a club for former Tsarist political prisoners as well as the Likachev Works Palace of Culture in Moscow. Vesnin was a vocal supporter of the works of Le Corbusier, and acclaimed his Tsentrosoyuz building as 'the best building constructed in Moscow for a century'. After the return to Classicism in the Soviet Union, Vesnin had no further major projects.

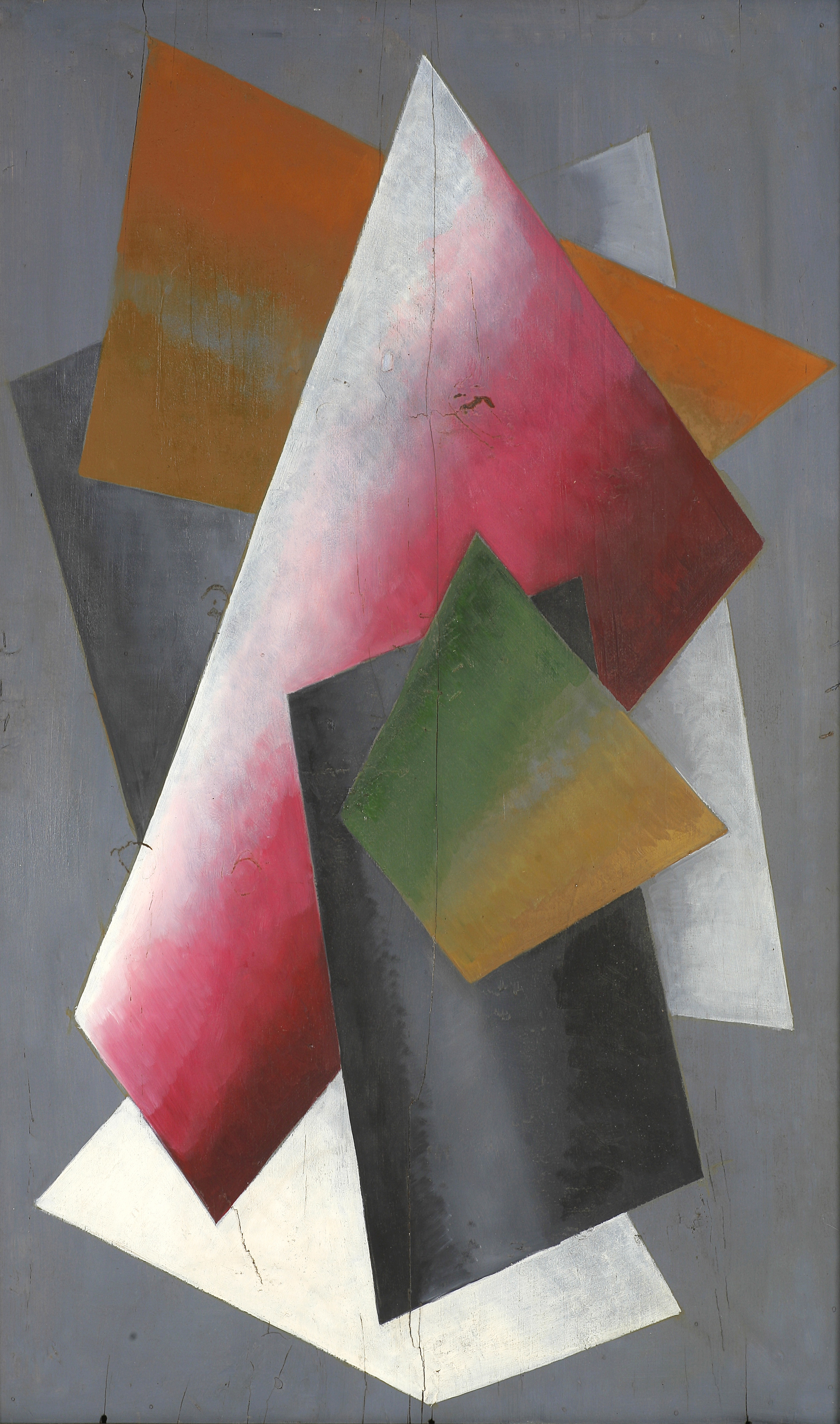
Abstract Composition. 1915c. M.T. Abraham Foundation

== Selected work ==
- 1934 People's Commissariat of Heavy Industry Project
- 1930 Oilworkers' Club, Baku
- 1930-36 Likachev Palace of Culture, Moscow
- 1928 House of Film Actors, Moscow
- 1926 Mostorg department store, Moscow
- 1924 Leningradskaya Pravda project
- 1922-23 Palace of Labor project
