= Catherine Cooke =

Catherine Anne Chichester-Cooke (2 August 1942 – 20 February 2004), known as Catherine Cooke, was a British architect and a Russian scholar of international renown. She was lecturer in design at the Open University and also lectured and taught at the Department of Architecture at the University of Cambridge.

== Life ==
Cooke was born in Bishop's Stortford on 2 August 1942, the only child of a brigadier in the Royal Engineers. She trained as an architect between 1961-7 at the Department of Architecture at the University of Cambridge, where she was one of a handful of women students in her year. After a short spell in architectural practice in Helsinki, notably not at the office of the Finnish architect Alvar Aalto as her father wanted, and then at Casson Condor in London, she returned to Cambridge to undertake her Ph.D. on Soviet Town Planning, which she completed in 1975.

Since then, Cooke’s interests broadened to cover all aspects of Soviet avant-garde design and Soviet architecture and town planning, and particularly Russian Constructivist architecture. She wrote, was an editor and lectured extensively on these subjects. Her editorial involvement with the Architectural Design magazine published by Academy Books led to a number of publications on Russian architects and designers such as Chernikhov. Particularly well known are her publications on the Russian Avant-garde and Constructivism in the post 1917 era. A fluent Russian speaker, Cooke was significantly instrumental in raising awareness in the West both about Russian visual culture and the sorry plight of a number of Soviet buildings, which she did through her UK chairmanship of Docomomo (the international working party for the documentation and conservation of buildings, sites and neighbourhoods of the Modern Movement).

Cooke amassed a significant collection of books, posters, and ephemera over the course of her working life. The Catherine Cooke collection is now housed in Cambridge University Library. In July 2012, an exhibition of items from the collection was opened in the library's public exhibition centre.

Cooke died following a road accident in Cambridge on 20 February 2004, when "at the height of a research and writing career".

== Works ==
Her contributions include:

- (ed.), The Avant-Garde (AD magazine, 1988)
- (ed.), Fantasy and Construction – Iakov Chernikhov (AD magazine, vol 59 no 7–8, London 1989)
- Architectural Drawings of the Russian Avant-Garde (MOMA, 1990)
- (with Igor Kazus) Soviet Architectural Competitions (Phaidon, 1992)
- Russian Avant-Garde: Theories of Art, Architecture and the City, Academy Editions, London, 1995
- (with Dennis Sharp) DOCOMOMO: The Modern Movement in Architecture, Uitgeverij, 010 Publishers, 2000.
