= Vesnin brothers =

Russian and soviet architects

Vesnin Brothers
- Occupation: Architect
- Parent: Vesnin Alexander Alexandrovich Vesnina (Ermolaeva) Elizaveta Alekseevna
- Buildings: Department store Mostorg on Krasnaya Presnya in Moscow
- Projects: Moscow office of the newspaper Leningradskaya Pravda

The Vesnin brothers: Leonid Vesnin (1880–1933), Viktor Vesnin (1882–1950) and Alexander Vesnin (1883–1959) were the leaders of Constructivist architecture, the dominant architectural school of the Soviet Union in the 1920s and early 1930s. Exact estimation of each brother's individual input to their collaborative works remains a matter of dispute and conjecture; nevertheless, historians noted the leading role of Alexander Vesnin in the early constructivist drafts by the Vesnin brothers between 1923 and 1925. Alexander also had the most prominent career outside of architecture, as a stage designer and abstract painter.

The brothers’ earliest collaboration in architecture dates back to 1906; their first tangible building was completed in 1910. Between 1910 and 1916 the Moscow-based family firm designed and built a small number of public and private buildings in Moscow and Nizhny Novgorod, stylistically leaning towards neoclassicism. During the Russian Civil War Leonid and Victor concentrated on industrial projects and teaching while Alexander had a successful solo career as theatre stage designer.

In 1922 the three brothers reunited, embraced avant-garde concepts and developed their own vision of modern architecture that emphasized functionality of buildings and modern construction technology. The Vesnin brothers won professional leadership through winning architectural contests of 1922–1925, and activities and publications of the OSA Group chaired by Alexander Vesnin. When the economy recovered from post-war depression, they were rewarded with high-profile real construction projects like the Dnieper Hydroelectric Station and Likhachev Palace of Culture in Moscow.

The death of Leonid Vesnin in 1933 coincided with the government's crackdown on independent art unions and modernist architecture. Victor continued a successful if unremarkable career in industrial architecture and administration of the Union of Soviet Architects, becoming the first President of the Soviet Academy of Architecture (1939–1949). Alexander failed to adjust to the rise of official Stalinist architecture and quietly withdrew from public professional activities.

== Family and education (1880s–1905) ==
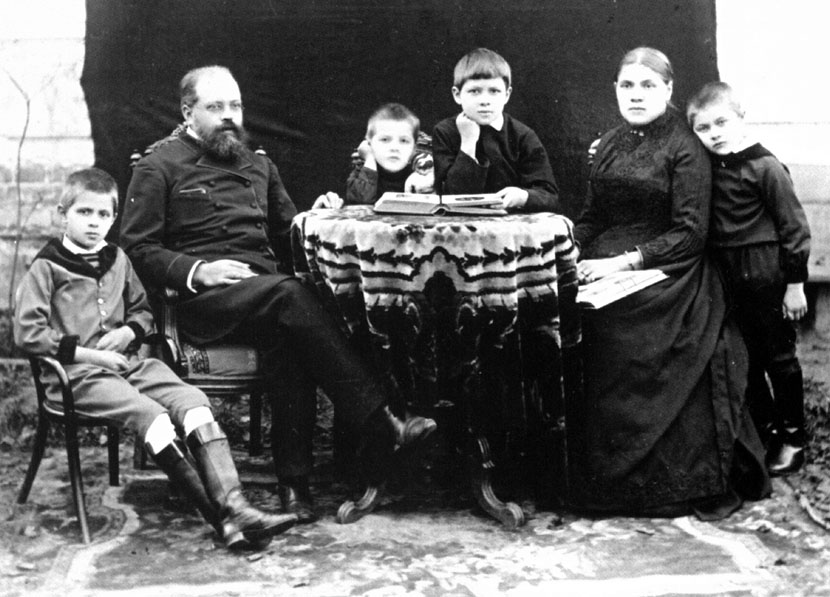
Family photo, c. 1890 Left to right: Victor Vesnin, Alexander Vesnin (father), Alexander Vesnin, Leonid Vesnin, Yelizaveta Vesnina (mother), Lidia Vesnina (sister)

Alexander Alexandrovich Vesnin, father of the Vesnin brothers, came from a Nizhny Novgorod merchant family. Shortly after marriage he relocated to his wife's home town Yuryevets on the Volga River where he established a distillery. The business ran successfully until the 1905 Russian Revolution; the Vesnins were wealthy enough to provide high school and graduate level education to all their children. The historical Vesnin House in Yuryevets became the Vesnin brothers museum in 1986.

Three sons: Leonid (born 1880), Victor (born 1882) and Alexander (born 1883) received basic home schooling and demonstrated talent in drawing since early childhood. At the age of 10 – 12 years their father sent them to a boarding school at the Academy of Commerce in Moscow where they perfected their drawing skills in the class of M. V. Mamistov.

Leonid, the older brother, enrolled at the Imperial Academy of Arts in Saint Petersburg in 1900. The father hoped that at least one of his sons would continue the family business, or at least obtain a business-like profession, and insisted that Victor and Alexander chose a different college, the Institute of Civil Engineers (also in Saint Petersburg). Architectural training at the Institute was clearly subordinate to engineering courses and practical construction training. Difference in age and training caused stylistic differences between Leonid and his junior brothers, at least in the early stages of their professional work. Leonid embraced Art Nouveau, which flourished from 1900–1905, Alexander and Victor leaned towards the Russian neoclassical revival that emerged around 1902 and gained widespread recognition after 1905.

The Vesnin family business was ruined by the 1905 revolution; from now on the brothers had to earn their own living and support two sisters and father (their mother died in 1901 giving birth to Anna Vesnina). Alexander and Victor dropped out of the Institute and moved to Moscow where they worked for architectural firms of Roman Klein, Illarion Ivanov-Schitz, Boris Velikovsky and other architects, building a reputation for their energy and dependability. Leonid stayed in Saint Petersburg and graduated from the class of Leon Benois in 1909.

== Early architecture (1906–1916) ==
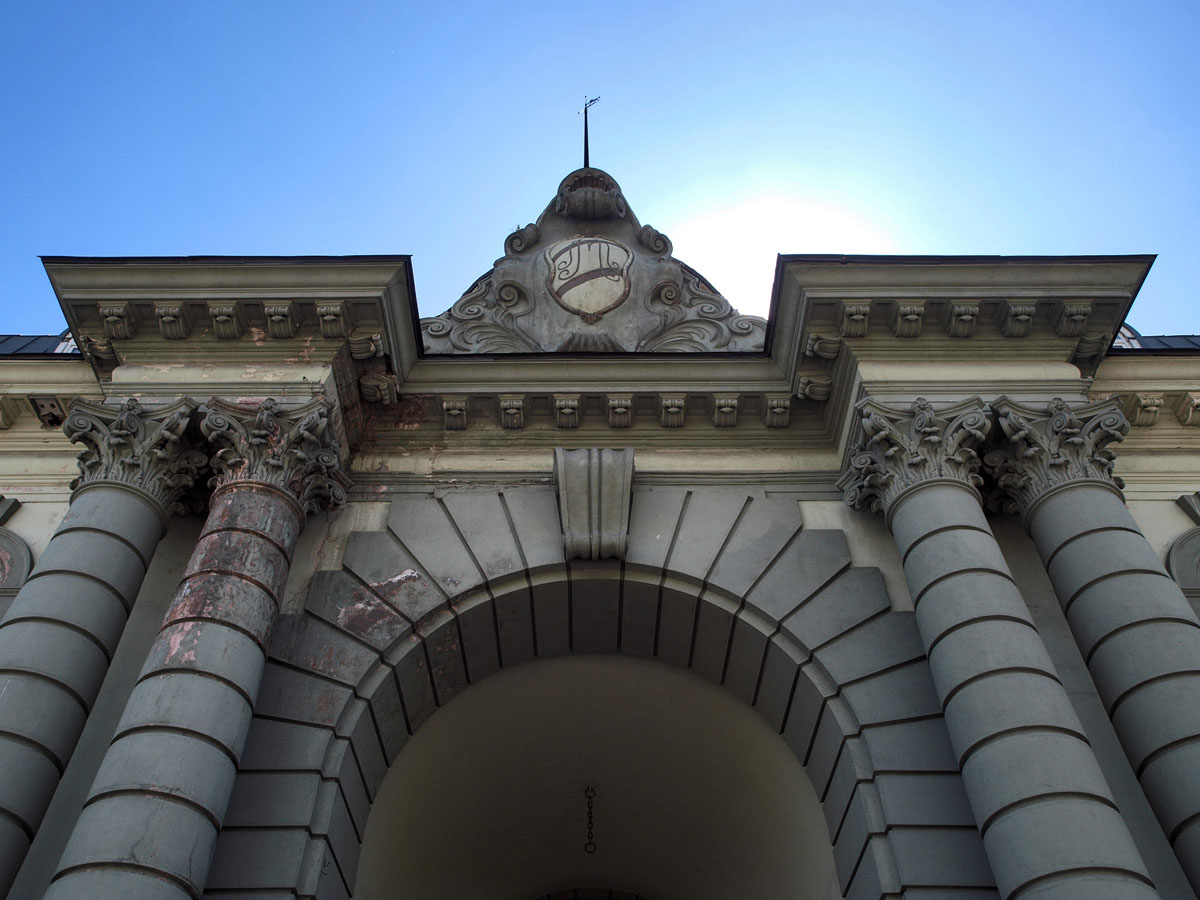
Grand entrance of Mantashev Stables in Moscow. 1914, design by Alexander Vesnin, Victor Vesnin and Arshar Izmirov.

In 1906 the brothers created their first public architectural draft – a neoclassical competition entry for the tram terminal at Strastnaya Square. The second, a 1908 draft for a church in Balakovo by Alexander and Victor, combined elements of medieval architecture of Uglich and Kolomenskoye. This draft was recommended by the commission, however, none of the brothers had an architect's license and the church was built by Fyodor Schechtel. Later, Victor Vesnin asserted that Schechtel executed the Vesnin brothers’ design, but contemporary authors give credit to Schechtel alone, citing different proportions and a simplified tented roof alignment. Other Vesnin drafts of this period lean towards traditional 19th century eclecticism with formal neoclassical trim. Each of these drafts bears personal stylistic clues, but exact attribution to Alexander, Leonid or Victor remains a matter of conjecture.

The first tangible building by Vesnin brothers, designed for Boris Velikovsky's firm, was a neoclassical six-storey apartment block on Myasnitskaya Square, completed in 1910. One year earlier, Leonid obtained an architect's licence and the brothers went independent. Their first building, the City Post Office on the same Myasnitskaya Street, was based on an earlier draft by Oscar Muntz, was approved for construction in 1911 and completed in 1912. The Vesnins retained the original planning and redesigned the facades in an eclectic Romanesque-Byzantine style. Their father's death in 1910 and, perhaps, improved finances, prompted Alexander and Victor to return to classrooms and complete professional training. Alexander graduated in May 1912. Incidentally, Alexander's and Victor's graduation drafts of 1911-1912 are the only architectural drawings actually signed by each brother individually, and thus provide insight into each brother's own stylistic preferences that later blended under the ‘’Vesnin brothers’’ trademark. Specifically, Alexander demonstrated proficiency in Russian Revival art but clearly mediocre, run-of-the-mill work in the neoclassical manner. Nevertheless, in 1912–1913 the Vesnin firm established itself among the Neoclassical Revival movement, as evidenced by the 1913 Historical Exhibition where their drafts were displayed along with works by Ivan Fomin, Ivan Zholtovsky and other masters of the style.

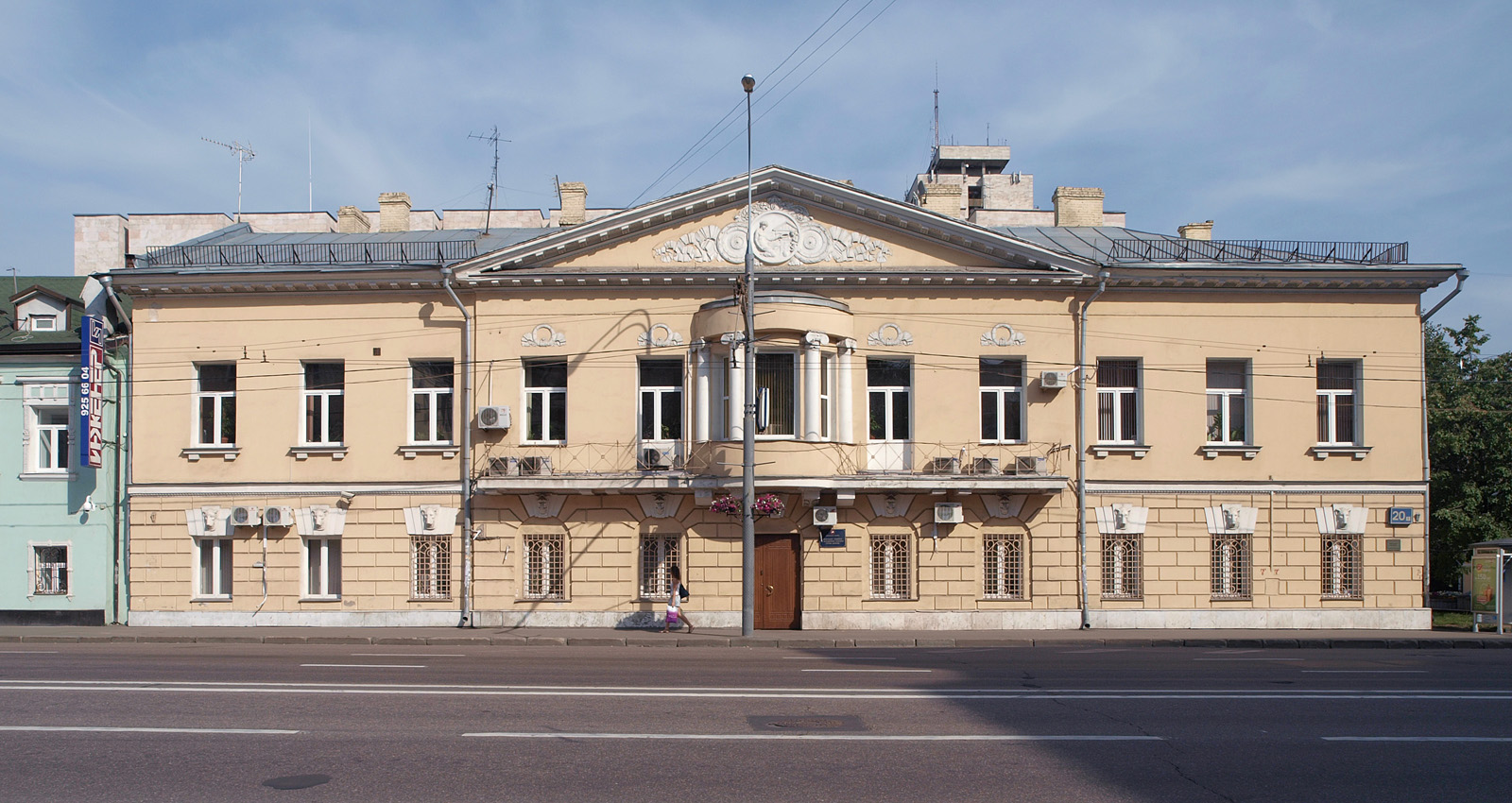
Aratsky House in Moscow - an early example of Vesnin neoclassicism, 1913.

Prior to the outbreak of World War I the brothers completed a bank building and a neoclassical mansion in Moscow and two country churches in Russian Revival manner. Their most visible building of the period, Mantashev Stables on Khodynka Field, mixes Petrine Baroque with Russian Revival and Neoclassicism, yet is clearly apart from mainstream eclecticism. The actual stables were demolished in the 2000s; the central core still stands.

At the beginning of World War I, Leonid was drafted and became a military engineer. Alexander and Victor stayed deep in the rear, in the factory belt on the Volga. Alexander was cashiered for poor eyesight, Victor worked in defence factory construction; his most important project of the period, a textile mill and adjacent worker's town in Kineshma, was completed in 1917. In 1914–1916 Alexander and Victor built the landmark neoclassical Sirotkin House in Nizhny Novgorod with elaborate internal paintings by Alexander. At the same time they collaborated with avant-garde artists Alexander Rodchenko and Vladimir Tatlin; the latter was initially Alexander's partner on Sirotkin House project but dropped out to pursue his futuristic experiments. By the time of the February Revolution Alexander was finally drafted but soon demobilized as the Imperial Army fell apart.

== Revolution and Civil War (1917–1922) ==
Alexander Vesnin's set design sketches for Alexander Tairov's 1923 production of The Man Who Was Thursday. The set, according to Catherine Cooke, influenced the Palace of Labor competition entry by Vesnin brothers.

In 1918 Alexander and Victor reunited for the prestigious decoration of Red Square for a May Day demonstration. Work for the Bolsheviks cost Victor his job for Nadezhda von Meck's heirs, but he and Leonid quickly found employment opportunities in industrial construction; Alexander stayed in starving Moscow.

Architectural drafts by Leonid and Victor Vesnin dated 1918-1922 clearly followed the pre-revolutionary neoclassical tradition. Yet, around 1923 the brothers emerged as leaders of a new, modernist, architecture. Selim Khan-Magomedov attributed this "instant" change to Alexander Vesnin's solo work in graphic arts and, in particular, in theatre. Leonid and Victor perceived themselves as primarily architects; when Civil War brought practical construction to a standstill, they joined the architectural faculty of MVTU and Vkhutemas, and continued exercises in “paper architecture”. Both (especially Victor) also worked on real-world industrial projects in Podolsk, Saratov, Shatura and other towns. Victor established ties with the textile industry of Ivanovo where he would build solo projects in the late 1920s.

Alexander, on the contrary, abandoned architecture for five years and dedicated himself to abstract art and stage design. In 1917-1918 critics placed Alexander on the "extreme left" of emerging modernist art, although Kazimir Malevich described his paintings as "too material". As Alexander moved from fringe abstract art to theatrical design, his sets for Alexander Tairov and Vsevolod Meyerhold shows regularly made headlines while his architectural past was nearly forgotten by contemporary press. Alexander actively experimented with "materializing" cubist art into three-dimensional, dynamic, tangible objects. Many contemporary artists (Malevich, Tatlin, El Lissitzky, Stenberg brothers) did the same, but, unlike them, Alexander had a solid background in structural engineering and practical construction management. His return to architecture in the end of 1922 explains the radical change in the Vesnin brothers' collaborative projects, first exposed to the public in February 1923.

== Paper architecture (1922-1925) ==
From 1922–1925, the Vesnin brothers designed six entries for public architectural competitions. These buildings never materialized (or were not intended to be built at all) but became a statement of constructivism; their stylistic cues were eagerly copied in practical construction in the second half of the 1920s. Alexander Vesnin contributed to all six drafts; Victor and Leonid each contributed to four drafts. Palace of Labor and Arcos were the only drafts signed by all three brothers. According to Harry Francis Mallgrave, these early works were "the first indication of what constituted constructivist architecture" (as opposed to earlier concept of constructivist art).

=== Palace of Labor ===
Palace of Labor. The congress hall (forward right) had nearly 10,000 seats.

In the end of 1922, Moscow City Hall announced a competition for the Palace of Labor on the downtown site of the present-day Hotel Moskva. It was the first national competition for a building perceived as the main building of the Soviet Union, with an 8,000-seat congress hall; ten years later, the idea resurfaced as the Palace of Soviets. Competition terms specifically ruled out any revivalist styles.

The Vesnins filed their draft, codenamed Antenna, in February 1923 along with 46 other entrants. (Note: Original drawings submitted by the Vesnins are lost, they survive only in journal publications. Artwork reproduced in modern history books is the preparatory material kept in family archives.) The rationalist arm of modernist architects led by Nikolai Ladovsky boycotted the competition, confident that the old-school commission led by Igor Grabar, Alexey Shchusev and Ivan Zholtovsky was biased against modernist art. Neoclassicists also neglected the contest, confident that the project would never materialize. The show attracted mostly constructivist architects and became a sweeping victory for the Vesnin brothers: their 125 meter tall reinforced concrete Palace, remotely reminiscent of Walter Gropius's Tribune Tower draft, made headlines in the professional mainstream press. Reviews by Vladimir Mayakovsky and Moisei Ginzburg declared Vesnins’ draft the definitive statement of modernism. Zholtovsky, did indeed reject the novelty and in the end, in May 1923, the first prize was awarded to Noi Trotsky; the Vesnins came third. For unknown reasons the highly publicized draft was omitted from the official competition catalogue; floorplans and cross-sections were published only in 1927, along with Ginzburg's praise: "It cannot be imitated. It can only be followed, along the thorny path of independent, thoughtful and creative work."

One month before filing the Palace of Labor, Leonid Vesnin presented his drafts of a housing block, marked by clever rational floorplans but otherwise fairly conventional. This fact, and the existence of early Palace of Labor sketches drawn by Alexander Vesnin are, according to Khan-Magomedov, evidence that the Palace was primarily inspired by Alexander. Catherine Cooke arrived at the same conclusion by examining Alexander's elaborate stage set for Alexander Tairov's production of The Man Who Was Thursday: the layout of the Palace, according to Cooke, was directly based on Alexander's earlier "fantastic conception". (Note: The Man Who Was Thursday actually premiered after many delays in December 1923, after Vesnins presented the Palace of Labor drafts.) Cheredina, on the contrary, noted that Victor Vesnin's own industrial drafts of 1922 were just as important in shaping the Vesnin brothers' collaborative style.

=== Leningrad Pravda ===
A draft of the diminutive Leningrad Pravda tower was created by Alexander and Victor in 1924. According to Khan-Magomedov, it became the summit of Alexander's architecture, the last instance when he enforced his leadership over his brothers and the last work unconditionally credited largely to him.

The Leningrad-based newspaper Moscow offices were intended to be first and foremost an advertising magnet, rather than actual offices. The client secured a strategic but very small (6×6 meters) parcel of land on Strastnaya Square in Moscow. The Vesnins responded with a lean, six-storey tower housing two-storey public area (newsstand and reading room) and four-storey editorial office. It embraced various engineering and avant-garde novelties, including Alexander's own stage sets and the design cues of Nikolai Ladovsky's rationalist school. However, the building was completely devoid of graphic art or sculpture of any kind. Alexander Vesnin rejected the concept of synthesis of the arts: for them, architectural form itself synthesized past experience in graphic art and spatial installations, and need no embellishments besides the inevitable advertising.

=== Arcos ===
Arcos draft did not materialize but inspired numerous tangible clones.

Arcos, a British-Soviet trading company that temporarily served as liaison between two countries without diplomatic ties, declared a public competition for its Moscow headquarters in 1924. The Vesnin brothers easily won the contest with a Brutalist, simple design emphasizing the structural grid of reinforced concrete and wraparound glazing. Moisei Ginzburg criticized the ‘’Arcos’’ draft as lacking any true novelty, which was expected of constructivist architecture: it was little more than a traditional office block wrapped in modern materials. Vesnins proposal became a model for numerous practical adaptations as the path of least resistance between novel concrete structure and traditional expectations of a "solid" facade. Critics like Ginzburg dubbed the emerging trend "constructive style", opposed to true "constructivism"; according to them, simple following the function was sufficient and needed no external stylistic cues, no aesthetics whether original or borrowed. According to Khan-Magomedov, by 1927 the Vesnins, fed up with indiscriminate copies of their own work, also subscribed to Ginzburg's opinion. Their Arcos did not materialize; actual Arcos building in Kitai-gorod was designed and built by former neoclassicist Vladimir Mayat in moderate "constructive style".

In 1925 Alexander and Leonid Vesnin teamed with structural engineer Alexander Loleyt. Loleyt's structural scheme disposed with external load-bearing columns altogether, allowing unrestricted use of glass curtain walls. The idea, however, has not caught their attention instantly: the Vesnins and Loleyt continued the style of Arcos in their 1925 Central Telegraph and TSUM department store drafts, gradually moving to simpler, larger, laconic shapes. In 1925 they stopped just one step short of glass curtain walls running the whole length and height of the building (the future International Style).

== Public activities ==
=== Vkhutemas ===
Both Alexander and Leonid joined the faculty of Vkhutemas during the Civil War, before the 1920-1921 conflict that split its Architectural Department into "academic" (Ivan Zholtovsky), "united" (Nikolai Ladovsky) and "independent" (Ilya Golosov) workshops. Leonid always associated himself with the old-school academic line of teaching. Alexander was engaged in the Painting department, teaching the basic subject of Color, a subject that potentially could become mandatory for students of all departments. Alexander had far-reaching plans of restructuring basic training at Vkhutemas along productivist ideas, that were cut short by its board in February 1923 Soon afterwards his students and staff, including Rodchenko, transferred to Ladovsky's United Workshop.

Victor and Leonid accepted an offer from Alexander Kuznetsov and joined the faculty of MVTU. Victor leaned towards industrial construction and targeted his courses to "real problems addressed by various state economic organs", rather than pure art. His MVTU class of 1924–1925 became another incubator of the constructivist movement.

Alexander was practically ousted from Vkhutemas until the March 1924 publication of the Arcos drafts instantly made him a celebrity. In the 1924–1925 season he was given a chair at a new, fourth, architectural workshop; Leonid assisted Alexander with management but did not interfere with the actual training process. Alexander Vesnin chaired his department until the dissolution of Vkhutemas in 1932; his workshop was engaged in informal rivalry with Ladovsky's United Workshop. Notable Vesnin alumni of this period include Andrey Burov (class of 1925), Mikhail Barsch (1926), Ivan Leonidov (1927) and Georgy Krutikov (1928).

=== OSA Group ===
In December 1925 short-lived artistic unions based at Vkhutemas, MVTU and Institute of Civil Engineers merged into a new organization, OSA Group, headed by Ginzburg and Alexander Vesnin. They recruited the formerly independent Ilya Golosov and Konstantin Melnikov, making OSA the most representative left-wing architectural group since inception. The government's reluctance to recognize yet another architects’ union forced OSA founders to reconsider its goals; these were proclaimed as “drafting the new, modern architectural style of large industrial hubs” and defence of constructivism as art, rather than the bare following of function. Later OSA leaders, including Alexander and Victor Vesnin, dropped the "constructivism as art" concept and frequently voiced the opposite viewpoint, that of rejecting any stylistic content in constructivism.

OSA was the only left-wing architects’ union that regularly published its magazine, SA (Contemporary Architecture), edited by Ginzburg and Alexander Vesnin. (Note: According to Khan-Magomedov, all other architectural magazines of the 1920s did not survive past the second issue.) Its editorial "offices" was based at the Vesnin's Moscow apartment and their country dacha. Alexander Vesnin "censored" the magazine, blocking any extremist, fringe theories that the liberal Ginzburg would accept. SA was issued continuously for five years, 1926–1930, and consolidated nearly all practicing constructivists, including Victor Vesnin. Leonid Vesnin, on the contrary, stood aside from OSA and never spoke publicly in favor of any trend in art.

Vyacheslav Glazychev noted that the unique role of SA led to an overstatement of the constructivists’ influence at the expense of rival art schools, especially by foreign authors. LEF and SA shaped a biased, incomplete image of Soviet architecture inside the country; their point of view, omitting successful work by the majority of Soviet architects of the period, was indiscriminately reproduced by Western historians. With or without the influence of SA, by the end of the 1920s constructivism became a generic word for "new architecture". Constructivism made a leap from fringe theory into mass culture, and OSA struggled to retain its monopoly on its former brand name.

== Tangible constructivism (1927-1937) ==
=== Vesnin workflow ===
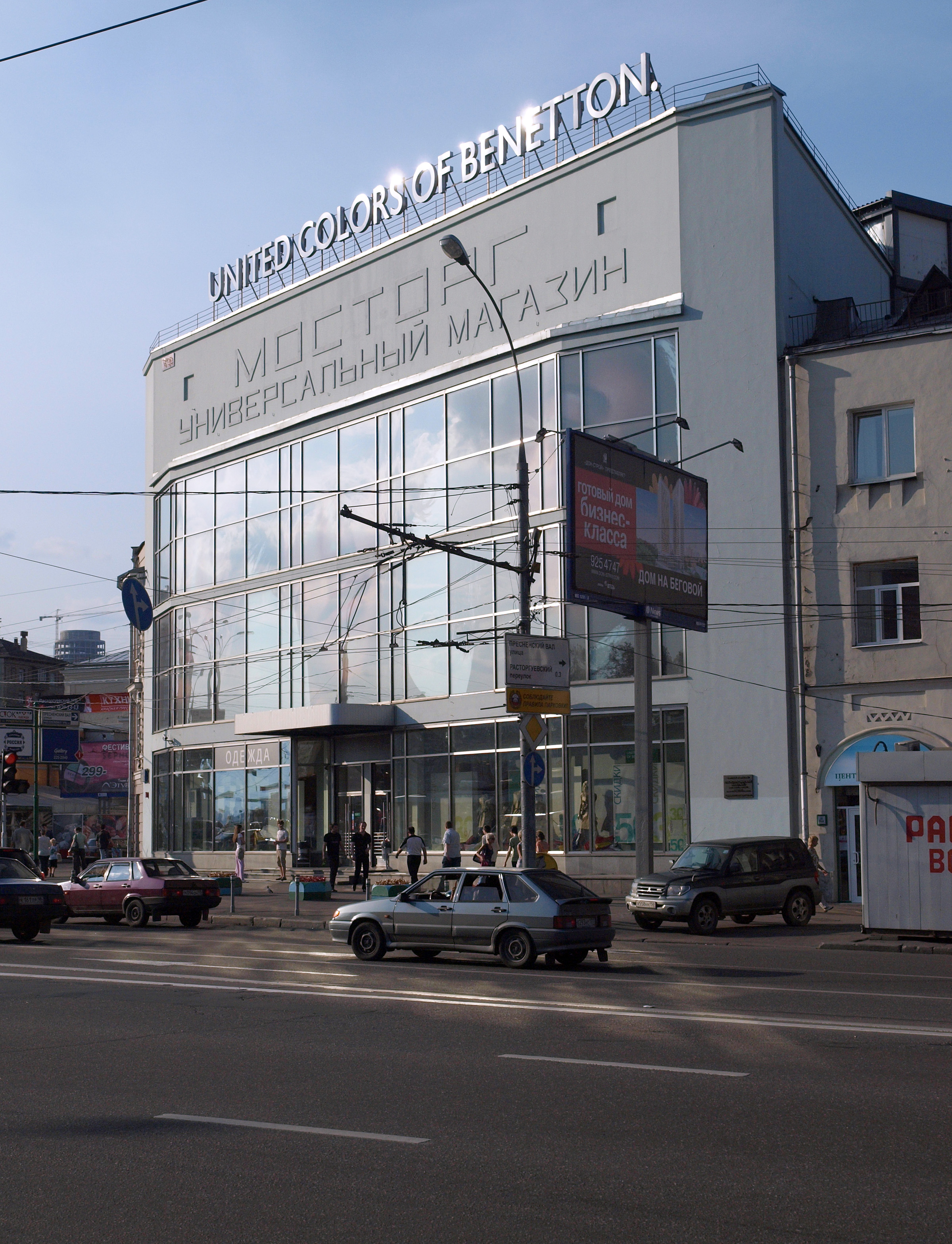
Department store in Presnensky District, 1927 (2008 photo)

Soviet critics "blended three richly different and highly complementary talents into one historical and professional personality." Memoirs published by Natalya Vesnina (Victor's widow), statements by the Vesnins' alumni and archive studies allowed different scholars to reconstruct each brother's input and work process. By 1927, the workflow of the firm, according to Khan-Magomedov, crystallized into clearly defined roles for each brother. Usually, Alexander provided the initial artistic concept and sketched the building exterior. Leonid managed functionality: floorplans and internal communications between functional parts of the building. Victor, who lived and worked separately from Alexander and Leonid, would come at a later stage as devil's advocate, pinpointing weaknesses of intermediate drafts. Neither Leonid nor Victor questioned Alexander's lead in defining overall exterior looks and composition. The brothers employed numerous student assistants and clearly preferred professional draftsmanship to sparks of genius; in fact, students who demonstrated their own creative ideas were quickly dismissed. To Vesnins' credit, they never incorporated such ideas in their projects.

=== Works for the Oil Industry ===
In 1927–1928 Alexander Vesnin, feeling himself responsible for the proliferation of a mediocre "constructive style", abandoned his earlier style demonstrated in the towering hulks of the Palace of Labor and Arcos. The new drafts by the Vesnin brothers decomposed the building into separate volumes linked according to the building's function. The approach, dubbed pavilion composition, was publicized in the Vesnins' 1928 draft for the Lenin Library. The Vesnins lost both stages of this contest to Vladimir Shchuko.

The first materialized constructivist work by the Vesnin brothers, a new workers' town was launched in the suburbs of Baku in 1925. The Vesnins developed a lasting association with Soviet oil industry (then based primarily in Azerbaijan). In 1928, they built three workers' clubs in Bailov, Suraxanı and the Black Settlement of Baku; all three followed the pavilion composition. These asymmetrical buildings had no visible oriental features but their low, horizontal outlines were tailored to fit into medieval Muslim city. Later, after World War II, the workshop of Victor and Alexander Vesnin worked full-time for the Ministry of Oil Industry.

=== Dnieper Power Plant ===
In 1929, when the Dnieper Hydroelectric Station dam was already in place, the state announced a competition to design its generator building. Competition for an apparently insignificant industrial building was elevated to the level of top state priority; competing drafts were displayed in the Moscow Kremlin. Floorplans and dimensions (nearly 200 meters long and 20 meters tall) were set in advance. Visually, the intended building was dominated by a taller and longer dam with its pattern of vertical buttresses.

Victor Vesnin entered this competition alone. All his rivals attempted to split the 200-meter wall with a rhythmic pattern of columns, arches or bay windows. Vesnin, on the contrary, completely eliminated any vertical patterns, confident that they would be dwarfed by the dam. Instead, the flat granite-clad wall was cut with a horizontal band of glass running nearly the whole length of the building. The final stage of the competition (January 1930) considered only two drafts - by Vesnin and Zholtovsky. Experts were split over the decision: Vesnin's structure was deemed inefficient and overweight; Zholtovsky's renaissance styling was deemed unacceptable. Engineering issues were brushed aside, and the commissioners chaired by Avel Enukidze (Anatoly Lunacharsky, Alexey Shchusev and others) clashed over style alone, finally awarding the contract to Vesnin. After World War II Victor Vesnin supervised reconstruction of Zaporizhia and rebuilt the destroyed power station to its original design.

The Vesnins continued competing for contracts in Ukraine, specifically Kharkiv. In 1930 they made a bid for the Cooperation Building and Government Building on Dzerzhinsky Square (opposite the Gosprom Building). Their draft was deemed the best aesthetically, but was not executed due to high estimated costs. Also in 1930, they won an international contest for the 6,000-seat Kharkiv Theatre. (Note: The competition specified a minimum capacity of 4,000. The Vesnins presented a transformable hall with different configurations seating from 2 to 6 thousand) Although the Vesnin brothers won the contract to produce working drawings, they were forced to share control with Arkady Mordvinov and his VOPRA associates, harsh critics of the OSA Group and other established architects. Friction among the "team" delayed construction for years; the project was abandoned when the capital of Ukraine relocated from Kharkiv to Kiev.

=== Likhachev Palace ===
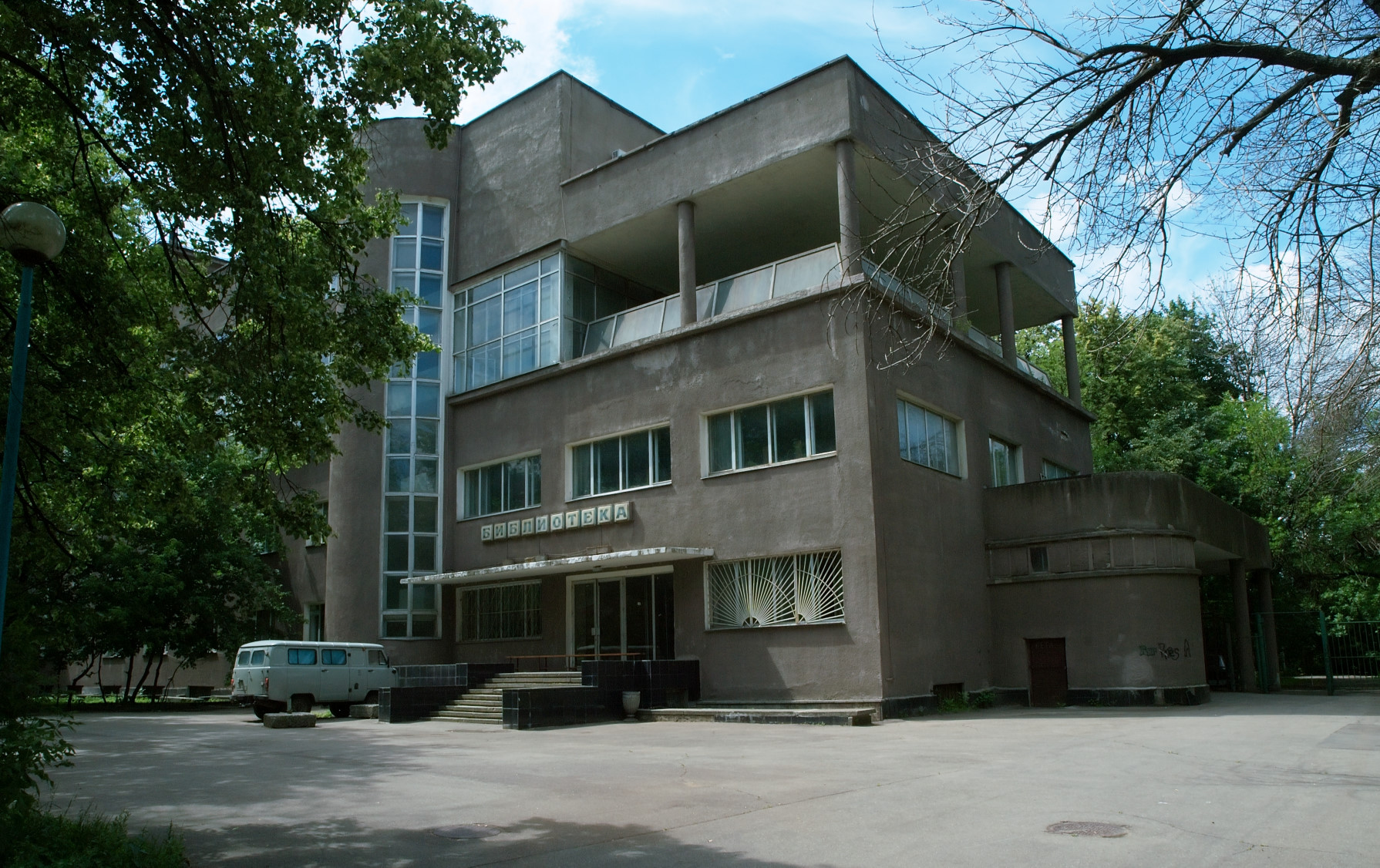
Library wing of Likhachev Palace, 1933-1937 (2008 photo)

The first public constructivist building actually built in Moscow by the Vesnin brothers, a 1927 department store in Presnensky District, was a scaled-down clone of their 1925 TsUM department store draft. It was followed by the Institute of Mineral Resources building in Zamoskvorechye District (1928) and a theater on Povarskaya Street (designed in 1929–1930, completed in 1931–1934).

The Vesnins did not take part in the public 1930 competition for the Proletarsky District Palace of Culture, to be built on the site of the demolished Simonov Monastery.After the competition ended with no clear winner the job was awarded to the Vesnins. Their original proposal, influenced by Le Corbusier’s ideas of ‘’flowing spaces’’, comprised two buildings – a complex T-shaped public services building with a 1,000 (Note: Actual as-built capacity 944 seats.) seat theatre hall, large dancing space, a library for 200,000 volumes and winter gardens, and a detached 4,000 seat main theatre. The latter, based on Kharkiv theatre draft, did not materialize. The smaller hall was inaugurated in 1933, construction of the public services building dragged until 1937. Unlike other constructivist buildings of the period, "enhanced" by stalinist facades, the Palace of Culture was completed in precise agreement with 1930 drafts. After World War II its exterior was, indeed, altered but all the Stalinist additions were stripped in the 1970s.

The building, operated by ZIL throughout most of its history, is known as Likhachev Palace of Culture.

== Leonid’s departure (1933-1940s) ==
The Vesnin brothers actively participated in all public architectural competitions of 1932–1936 (Palace of Soviets, Narkomtiazhprom, STO building in Moscow and Government of Ukraine compound in Kiev), but lost all their bids to revivalist architects. Leonid died in October 1933, soon after the Palace of Soviets competition sealed the demise of constructivism. A street in Moscow (former and current Denezhny Lane) where he lived was named in his honour from 1933 to 1991. Alexander and Victor recruited the young revivalist architect Sergey Lyaschenko, who became the style expert of the firm as Alexander gradually withdrew from practical architecture.

=== Palace of Soviets and Narkomtiazhprom ===
The Vesnin brothers were selected as one of thirteen teams invited to the third round of Palace of Soviets contest (1932). The complex composition of cylindrical and prismatic shapes connected by skywalk galleries clearly borrowed from their earlier Palace of Soviets. According to Khan-Magomedov, it was marginally inferior to competing modernist entries by Ladovsky and Ginzburg. For the fourth (and last) stage the Vesnins radically redesigned their proposal; this time, all parts of the building merged into a single monolithic volume. The Vesnins apparently reversed to the despised "constructive style", blending constructivist styling with a monumental structure more appropriate of stalinist architecture.

The same pattern continued at the Narkomtiazhprom contest. The first (1934) draft proposed four glass skyscrapers connected by skywalks. After experimenting privately with a twin tower option, in 1936 the Vesnins and Lyaschenko switched to a single star-shaped, relatively wide tower shrouded by typical socialist realist sculpture and pseudo-classic arches. Neither of these designs gained official recognition.

Perhaps the only high-profile public project awarded to the Vesnins after 1932 was the design of Paveletskaya-Radialnaya station of the Moscow Metro. However, due to war-time cost cuts the station was built in a different, temporary shape. In 1950–1952 it was rebuilt to a new design by Alexey Dushkin.

=== Alexander ===
The tandem of Victor and Alexander fell apart in the second half of the 1930s. Alexander stepped aside from active professional life, perhaps unable or unwilling to blend into the official style. His last public design, for the government building in Zaryadye, is dated 1940. During World War II Alexander, evacuated to Chimkent, designed makeshift new workers towns for the defense factories. In his spare time he painted numerous canvasses on Central Asian subjects, first displayed to the public in 1961 and considered his best since the early 1920s. After the war he retired from architecture although he held the title of chief architect for the Ministry of Oil Industry until 1950.

=== Victor ===
Victor Vesnin was the sole constructivist architect that retained or even improved his role in Joseph Stalin's establishment after the Palace of Soviets contest sealed the stylistic outline of Stalinist architecture. Between 1932 and 1938, he chaired the Union of Soviet Architects, a state-managed union that replaced all the formerly independent associations. In the same period, being chief architect of the Supreme Soviet of the National Economy and its successor, Commissariat for Heavy Industry, he reported directly to Grigoriy Ordzhonikidze and was the top-ranking architect of the Soviet industrialization. He cooperated on good terms with Albert Kahn and was the only Soviet to send condolences to Kahn's widow after his death in 1942. Vesnin's alumnus and protege Anatoly Fisenko (1902–1982, MVTU class of 1925) was the principal point of contact between Soviet authorities and Kahn's firm, and was secretly tasked with training masses of local students at the expense of Kahn's Moscow offices. (Note: Meerovich noted Kahn's anger at the fast rotation of Soviet staff at his Moscow offices. Kahn was not aware that for most of his Soviet employees work for him was not a real employment but a short-term training assignment managed through state agencies.) After the breakup with Kahn in 1932 Fisenko was arrested, spent half a year in prison but was extricated by Victor Vesnin. Gosproyektstroy-1 (later Metallostroyproyekt), managed by Fisenko and supervised by Vesnin before World War II, designed practically all Soviet metallurgical plants, Gorky Auto Plant, Zhiguli Hydroelectric Station and other top priority industrial sites.

Highly valued work for the militarized industry kept Victor on top, but also meant withdrawal from actual architectural design and public professional life. His involvement in design process, the workings of Soviet-Kahn partnership and the means of "borrowing" American design technology remain unknown to the public, despite the fact that Vesnin remained a public person, one of the few constructivists known in the West and still active. He chaired the Soviet Academy of Architecture (1939–1949) and was awarded the 1945 British Royal Gold Medal by the RIBA for lifetime professional achievement.

== Sources ==
- Alexandrov, Yu. N.; Zhukov, K. V. (1978). Siluety Moskvy (Силуэты Москвы). Moscow: Moskovsky rabochy.
- Cheredina, I. S. (2007). "Arkhitektor, kotory umel proyektirovat vsyo (Архитектор, который умел проектировать всё)". Vestnik Rossiiskoi Akademii Nauk. 77 (4). Russian Academy of Sciences: 341–358. Archived from the original on March 4, 2016.
- Cracraft, James; Rowland, Daniel Bruce (2003). Architectures of Russian Identity: 1500 to the Present. Cornell University Press. ISBN 978-0-8014-8828-3.
- Catherine Cooke. The Vesnin's Palace of Labor, in: Neil Leach, ed. (1999). Architecture and revolution: contemporary perspectives on Central and Eastern Europe. Routledge. ISBN 978-0-415-13915-1.
- Vyacheslav Glazychev (1989). "Rossiya v petle modernizatzii (Россия в петле модернизации)". Archived from the original on July 30, 2009.
- Khan-Magomedov, Selim (2007). Alexander Vesnin (Александр Веснин и конструктивизм) (in Russian). Russky avangard. ISBN 978-5-9647-0116-3.
  English edition: Selim Khan-Magomedov (1986). Alexander Vesnin and Russian Constructivism. University of Michigan / Rizzoli.
- Mallgrave, Harry Francis (2005). Modern Architectural Theory: A Historical Survey, 1673-1968. Cambridge. ISBN 0-521-79306-8.
