= Leonid Vesnin =

Russian Soviet architect (1880–1933)

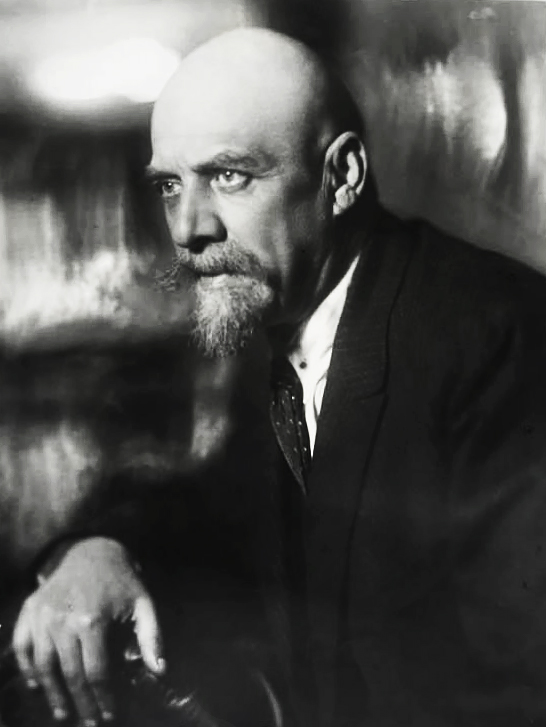
- Born: Leonid Aleksandrovich Vesnin; 10 December [O.S. 28 November] 1880; Nizhny Novgorod, Russian Empire
- Died: 8 October 1933; Moscow, Soviet Union
- Education: Imperial Academy of Arts
- Occupation: Architect
- Parent(s): Vesnin Alexander Alexandrovich, Vesnina (Ermolaeva) Elizaveta Alekseevna
- Practice: Vesnin brothers
- Buildings: ZIL Palace of culture Mostorg Department store
- Projects: Leningradskaya Pravda Narkomtyazhprom

Leonid Aleksandrovich Vesnin (Russian: Леони́д Александрович Веснин; 10 December [O.S. 28 November] 1880 – 8 October 1933) was a Russian and Soviet architect. He was the eldest of the Vesnin brothers, who were influential in developing Constructivist architecture.

== Biography ==
Leonid Aleksandrovich was born on 10 December [O.S. 28 November] 1880 in a merchant family in Nizhny Novgorod. He went to Moscow Practical Academy of Commercial Sciences from 1890 to 1899. In 1900 he got into Imperial Academy of Arts and was a student of Leon Benois until he graduated in 1909.

== Selected work ==
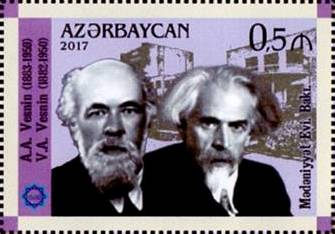
Stamps of Azerbaijan, 2017

- 1934 People's Commissariat of Heavy Industry Project
- 1930 Palace of Culture of the Proletarskie district, Moscow
- 1928 House of Film Actors, Moscow
- 1926 Mostorg Department store, Moscow
- 1924 Leningradskaya Pravda project
- 1922–23 Palace of Labor project
