= Viktor Vesnin =

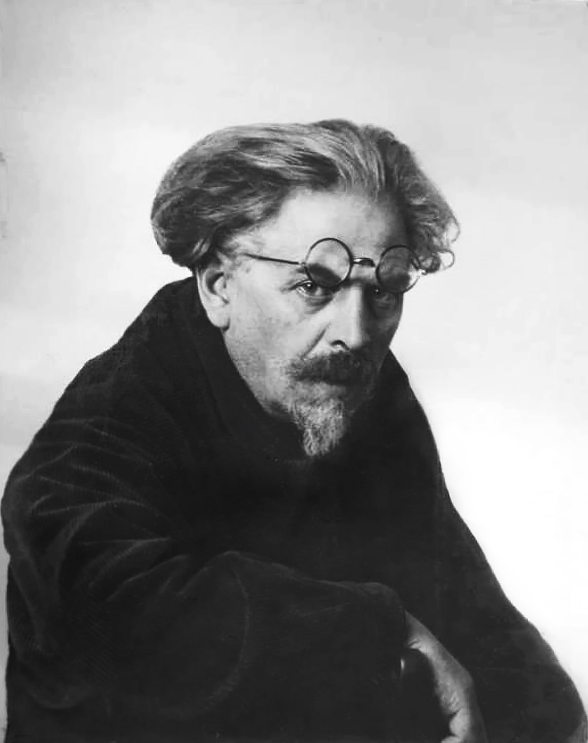
- Born: Viktor Aleksandrovich Vesnin; April 9, 1882; Yuryevets, Kostroma Governorate, Russian Empire
- Died: September 17, 1950 (aged 68); Moscow, Russian SFSR, Soviet Union
- Occupation: Architect
- Practice: Vesnin Brothers, NKTP Architectural Board
- Buildings: DnieproGES
- Projects: Palace of Soviets, NKTP Building on Red Square

Viktor Aleksandrovich Vesnin (Russian: Виктор Александрович Веснин; April 9, 1882 – September 17, 1950), was a Russian and Soviet architect. His early works (1909–1915) follow the canon of Neoclassicist Revival; in the 1920s, he and his brothers Leonid (1880–1933) and Alexander (1883–1959) emerged as leaders of Constructivist architecture, the Vesnin brothers. After the crackdown on Constructivism in 1931-32 and until his death, Viktor Vesnin was the highest-ranked architect in Soviet system, heading the Union of Soviet Architects and Academy of Architecture. As a lead architect for heavy construction, he supervised many industrial projects, but his own visionary drafts of this period never materialized.

== Selected work ==
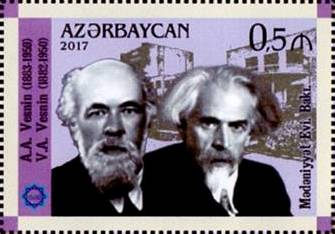
Stamps of Azerbaijan, 2017

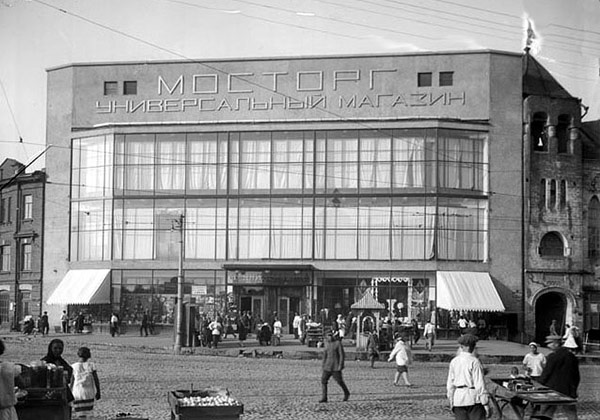
Mostorg department store, 1928

- 1934 People's Commissariat of Heavy Industry Project
- 1927-1932 DnieproGES, with Nikolai Kolli
- 1930 Palace of Culture of the Proletarsky district, Moscow
- 1928 House of Film Actors, Moscow
- 1926 Mostorg department store, Moscow
- 1924 Leningradskaya Pravda project
- 1922-23 Palace of Labor project
- 1915 Sirotkin House, Nizhny Novgorod
- 1914 Mantashev Stables, Moscow Racetrack (with A.G.Izmirov, Alexander Vesnin)
