= People's Commissariat of Heavy Industry =

Soviet government agency

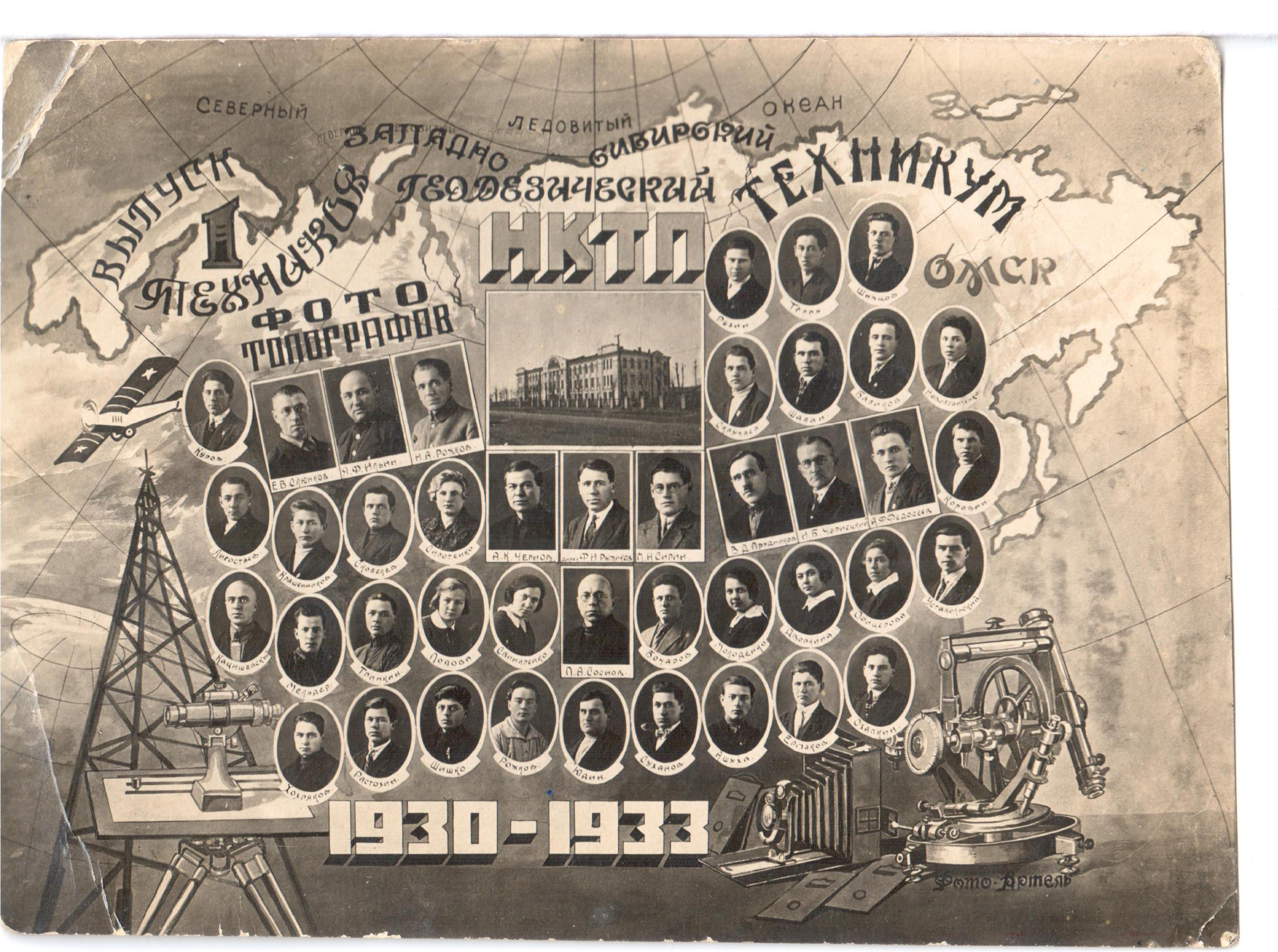
Poster celebrating the work of Narkomtiazhprom in 1930–33

The People's Commissariat of Heavy Industry (Russian: Народный комиссариат тяжёлой промышленности СССР, romanized: Narodnyy komissariat tyazholoy promyshlennosti SSSR), known as Narkomtiazhprom (Наркомтяжпром) was a government ministry in the Soviet Union in the 1930s. Glavenergo which operated the electric power system in the Soviet Union was subordinated to the commissariat.

== Brief overview ==
The People's Commissariat of Heavy Industry, known by the initialism NKTP (НКТП), was founded in 1932 out of the Supreme Soviet of the National Economy and was responsible for all heavy industrial goods, including mining, machinery and defense goods.

The defense industry assets were separated in December 1936, with the creation of the People's Commissariat of the Defense Industry, and in August 1937 there was set up the People's Commissariat for Mechanical Engineering. In early 1939 the NKTP was divided into six separate commissariats.

=== Succeeding commissariats ===
- People's Commissariat of the Defense Industry
- People's Commissariat for Mechanical Engineering
- People's Commissariat of Fuel Industry
- People's Commissariat of Ferrous Metallurgy
- People's Commissariat of Non-Ferrous Metallurgy
- People's Commissariat of Power Plants and Power Generating Industry
- People's Commissariat of Chemical Industry
- People's Commissariat of Construction Materials Industry

== List of people's commissars (ministers) ==
- Sergo Ordzhonikidze (5.1.1932 – 25.2.1937)
- Valery Mezhlauk (25.2.1937 – 23.8.1937)
- Lazar Kaganovich (23.8.1937 – 24.1.1939)

== Research institutes ==
Organisations they took responsibility for include:

- Leningrad Military Mechanical Institute
- Kharkiv Institute of Physics and Technology
- Reactive Scientific Research Institute

== See also ==
- Narkomtiazhprom Building
