= Architectural Studio for the Replanning of Moscow =

The Architectural Studio for the Replanning of Moscow was an organisation established by Mossoviet in August 1918, five months after the Bolshevik decision to make Moscow the capital of the Russian Socialist Federative Soviet Republic which had been formally founded the month before. The Studio was headed by Ivan Zholtovsky, and Alexey Shchusev
