= Ivan Zholtovsky =

Russian architect

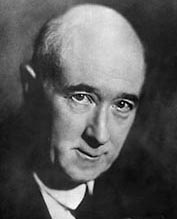
- Born: Ivan Vladislavovich Zholtovsky; 27 November 1867; Plotnitsa, Pinsky Uyezd, Minsk Governorate, Russian Empire
- Died: 16 July 1959 (aged 91); Moscow, Soviet Union
- Occupation: Architect

Ivan Vladislavovich Zholtovsky (Russian: Иван Владиславович Жолтовский, Belarusian: Іван Уладзіслававіч Жалтоўскі; November 27, 1867 – July 16, 1959) was a Soviet and Belarusian architect and educator. He worked primarily in Moscow from 1898 until his death. An accomplished master of Renaissance Revival architecture before the Russian Revolution, he later became a key figure of Stalinist architecture. He was one of the members of the art association ‘The Four Arts’, which existed in Moscow and Leningrad in 1924-1931.

== Early years ==
Ivan Zholtovsky was born in Plotnitsa, Minsk Governorate (in present-day Belarus) November 27, 1867. He joined Academy of Arts in Saint Petersburg at the age of 20. Degree studies took 11 years till 1898 – strapped for cash, Ivan used to take long leaves working as apprentice for the Saint Petersburg architectural firms. By the time of graduation, Zholtovsky had a first-rate practical experience in design, technology and project management. He retained this hands-on approach for the rest of his career, being a construction manager in the original sense of architectural profession. Zholtovsky planned to relocate to Tomsk after graduation, but eventually received and accepted a quick job offer from Stroganov Art School in Moscow. He became a tutor in architecture just weeks after earning his own diploma – a part-time job that allowed plenty of time for professional practice.

== The Renaissance Man, 1900-1917 ==
From the very start, he joined the "traditionists" revival group (ретроспективисты, lit. retrospectivists), placing himself against then-dominant Art Nouveau (Russky Modern). His search for classic excellence took some time, as he was equally influenced by Russian classicism and Italian Renaissance. While Neoclassical revival was at this time the second largest school in Russia (in high demand in Saint Petersburg, less so in Moscow), the Renaissance influence was unique to Zholtovsky, and will remain his trademark style until his death.

He traveled to Italy frequently, recording its architectural legacy. Zholtovsky's Italian collection is still frequently exhibited, including rare photographs of Venetian St Mark's Campanile prior to collapse on July 14, 1902 He spoke fluent Italian, translated Palladio’s Four Books in Russian (and eventually published them in 1938). Notable works of this period:

- Tarasov House (Moscow, completed 1912) based on Palladio's Palazzo Tiene in Vicenza and, marginally, the Doge's Palace in Venice, is his best known pre-Revolutionary work. It served as American Relief Administration Russian Unit's headquarters during the Russian famine of 1921.
- Racetrack Society House (Moscow, 1903; he would return to Racetrack project half a century later)
- Nosov House (Moscow, 1908)
- Lipovka (Lipki, Moscow Oblast, 1908); built as a datscha for Alfred Ruperti, later reconstructed as one of Joseph Stalin's residences under the name Lipki, now part of Children's Oncology Institute
- Ivan Konovalov's factory with hospital, nursery and living quarters (Bonyachki estate, near Kineshma, 1912, with V. D. Adamovich)

Practice, educator's work and outspoken public activity in artistic world earned him the Academic title as soon as 1909. By the time of the Russian Revolution, when he was reaching the age of 50, Zholtovsky was already considered a master builder, an elder in his profession.

== Advisor to Bolsheviks, 1917-1926 ==
Zholtovsky stayed in Moscow throughout the course of World War I, Revolution of 1917 and Civil War. In 1918, he and Alexey Shchusev led the Architectural Studio for the Replanning of Moscow, Moscow's only state architectural firm, hiring and training young men like Ilya Golosov, Panteleimon Golosov, Konstantin Melnikov, Nikolai Ladovsky and Nikolai Kolli (the 12 disciples, split evenly between constructivism and traditional art). There were few orders, mostly for repairs or additions of old properties, and very few actually materialized. As construction halted, he concentrated on education and urban planning studies.

Zholtovsky continued teaching at Vkhutemas. Whether the architectural college in Leningrad (VKhuTEIN) was led by traditionalists, Moscow college (Vkhutemas) became a harbor for modernists. Zholtovsky was spared from revolutionary new-vs-old rhetoric: after all, he was the employer to many modernist architects, giving them whatever jobs he could secure (like the pavilions of 1923 All-Russian Agricultural Exhibition, a project managed jointly by Zholtovsky and Shchusev).

Together with Shchusev, and relying on his juniors, Zholtovsky supervised the first master plan for redevelopment of Moscow. This work earned him a credit with the Bolshevik administration. He met with Vladimir Lenin and was very well received; according to Zholtovsky's own memoirs (as approved for print in the USSR), Master Plan was commissioned by Lenin himself, who wasn't exactly competent in architecture and couldn't recall any past projects of his contractor. Zholtovsky's plan, as reported to Lenin, relied on shifting urban development into greenfield land to the south-west of the city. Later, he and Shchusev settled on a less radical growth model with only minor attempt to break away from circular layout by cutting two major avenues through the city core. This plan was discarded by Stalin in 1932.

Works of this period (none survived to date)

- Novaya Moskva master development plan (1918–1923, lead planner Alexey Shchusev)
- All-Russian Agricultural Exhibition - general layout and management (with Alexey Shchusev), entrance gates (1923)
- AMO workers' low-rise community (with Melnikov, 1923)
- Soviet pavilion at Milan exhibition (1925–26)

== Practice again, 1926-1932 ==
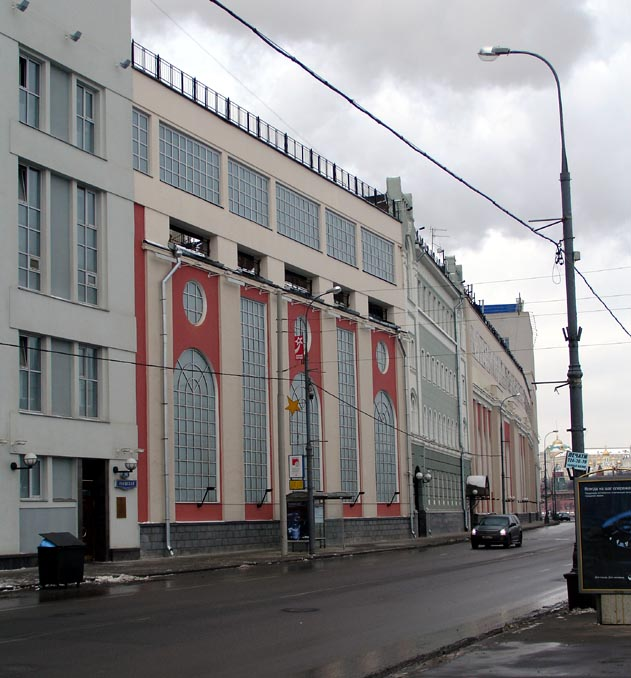
MOGES-1 Powerplant Expansion. Third-floor wall is a fake curtain

When he came back from a long trip to Italy in 1923–1926, New Economic Policy (NEP) brought considerable relief to architects. Seasoned professionals were in demand again, mostly from state or semi-state companies. For a brief period, architects worked the old fashioned way, with their firms and apprentices. Some of Zholtovsky's students operated their own projects, some joined the firm. Zholtovsky's three better-known works of the time are:

- State Bank expansion at Neglinnaya Street (Moscow, completed 1929)
- House of Soviets (Makhachkala, 1927)
- First Electrical powerplant (MoGES-1) expansion (Moscow, 1927)

== Workshop No.1, 1932-1941 ==
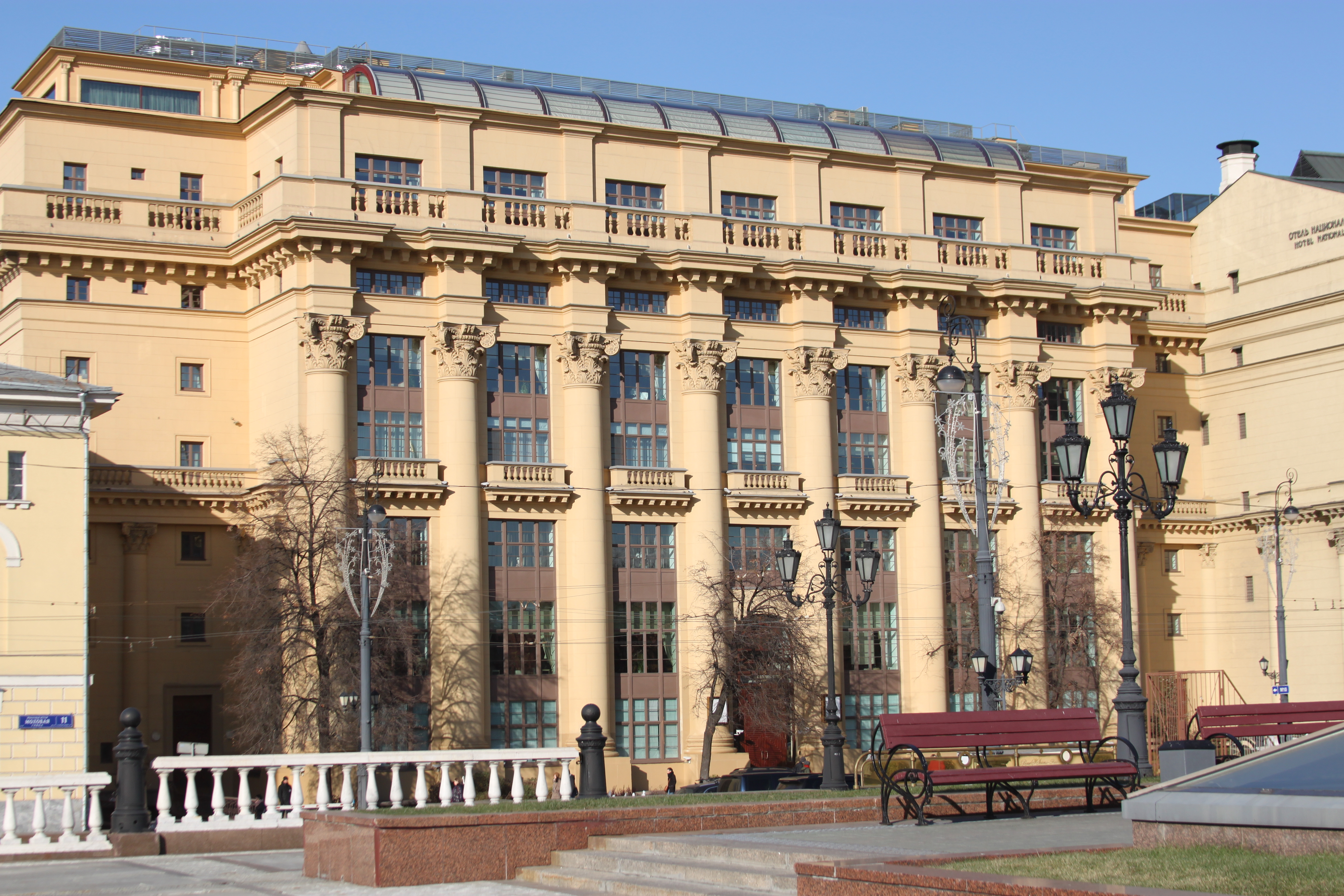
Mokhovaya Street Building, 1931-1934

In 1931–1932, the State consolidated once mosaic architectural profession. In June, 1931, Central Committee authorized three megaprojects – reconstruction of Moscow, Moscow Canal and Moscow Metro, creating thousands of architectural and engineering jobs under tight state control. A fourth megaproject, Palace of the Soviets, was already in design contest stage. Zholtovsky shared contest prize with Boris Iofan and Hector Hamilton; Iofan's draft was later selected. Zholtovsky, however, refused to work for Metro, believing that the lowly underground job is not worth his time.

After the carrot came the stick: in April 1932 another Party ruling outlawed all independent artistic unions; they were replaced with state-controlled Union of Soviet architects (July 1932) and Academy of Architecture (1933).

Independent architects had to join state projects, switch to bureaucratic jobs (Viktor Vesnin) or quit (like Melnikov did). Reconstruction of Moscow project was set up as 10 state architectural workshops, roughly corresponding to the radial sectors of the city. Zholtovsky was invited to lead Workshop No.1; like other old architects (Shchusev, Vladimir Shchuko, Ivan Fomin), he fitted perfectly in Stalin's system. His educational work was in high esteem: in 1935 and 1937 Politburo appointed him to speak on education at the forthcoming Congress of Architects (this Congress was delayed twice, and each time list of speakers was approved at the very top).

His pre-war works range from seaside resorts to industrial freezers, although his actual personal input to each project, with a few exceptions, is not clear. His most influential, undisputed work, highly praised by officials, was completed in 1934, right across the Kremlin. An apartment house at Mokhovaya Street, originally House of Engineers and Technicians (Дом ИТР) is still known as Zholtovsky House.

== War and postwar years, 1945-1959 ==
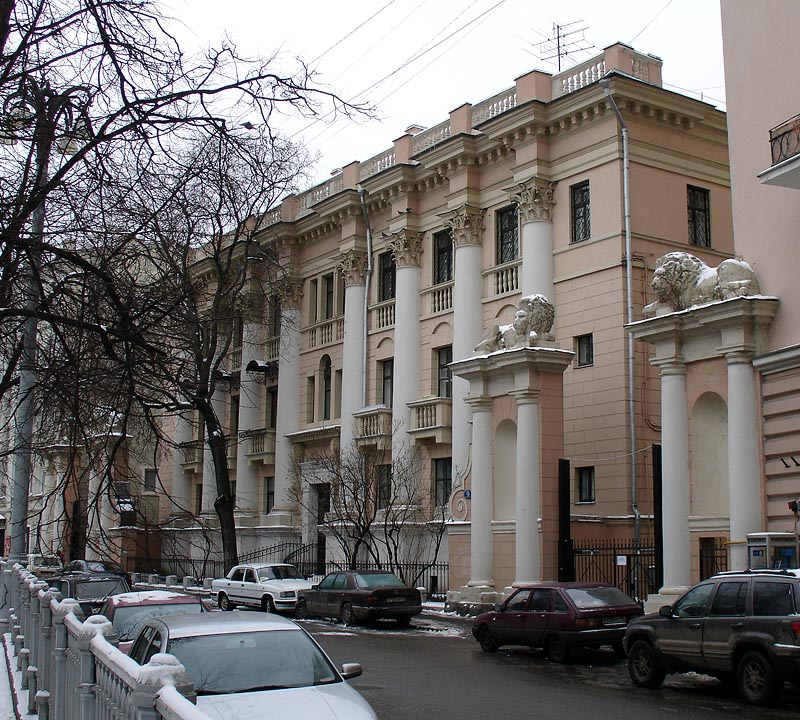
House of Lions, 1945, Patriarch Ponds, Moscow

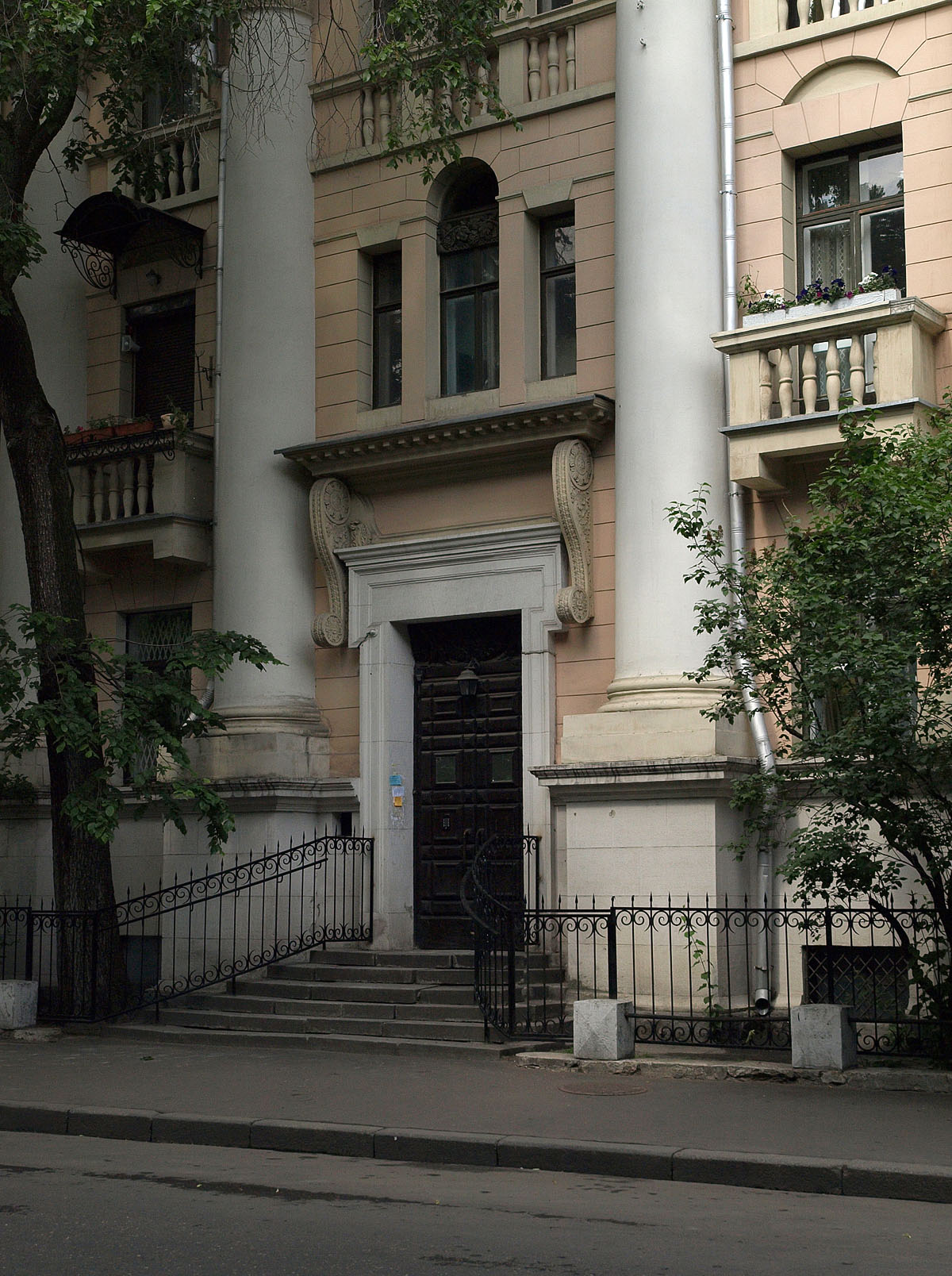
House of Lions, 1945, grand entrance Patriarch Ponds, Moscow

In 1940, already 73 years old, Zholtovsky accepts the chair of Moscow Architectural Institute (MArchI). Zholtovsky stayed in Moscow throughout World War II, managing MArchI and engaged in various consultancies; when time came to repair the damage of war, he was too old to take serious out-of-town jobs. He bid for expansion of Mossoviet headquarters, making 18 proposals (1939–1945,); all failed, and the job was awarded to Dmitry Chechulin. In summer 1945, the state instituted Zholtovsky School and Workshop, where he would work till his death.

In the same 1945, Zholtovsky workshop completed a controversial House of Lions, in Yermolayevsky lane - a luxurious downtown residence for Red Army Marshals, styled as an early 19th-century estate. Reverence to top brass backfired very soon. Zholtovsky issued his students an exercise to design Country residence of a Marshal of Soviet Union. Immediately, political accusations poured in; November 2, 1945 Zholtovsky received a formal order to discard completed student projects, reverse their grades, and issue a new, politically correct, assignment.

After 1945, Zholtovsky personally designed only three apartment houses in Moscow (including an expansion of his 1935 NKVD building on Smolenskaya Square). The best known, a 1949 Bolshaya Kaluzhskaya building is an interesting illustration of Zholtovsky's shift from elite to the masses, an attempt to bring mass construction to the levels of quality expected of Stalinist architecture and his own Renaissance style. All apartments in this building are relatively small, with two rooms yet with plenty storage space. Floor plans deliberately discouraged conversion of small-family units to overcrowded multi-family kommunalki (kitchen is accessible only through the family rooms). Zholtovsky's favorite flat walls (no bay windows, no setbacks) and modest application of Florentine canon fit the purpose quite well.

In 1948, 80-year-old Zholtovsky became the subject of a witch-hunt once again. With no apparent reason, small-time critics slammed his works and his role in education. Zholtovsky lost the chair of MArchI. In February 1949, a "professional round table" branded his Bolshaya Kaluzhskaya House as formalist, condemned Zholtovsky's educational efforts, and virtually excommunicated him from practice for a year. Suddenly, fortune turned around, and in March, 1950 Zholtovsky was awarded Stalin Prize, second class – for the same building that was ostracized a year before. By 1952, critics praised it as the way to build.

== Death and legacy ==
Zholtovsky was married twice and left no children. Since 1920 he lived in a 19th-century Stankevich House in Voznesensky lane. He died of pneumonia at the age of 92. As soon as he died, his widow, pianist Olga Arenskaya, was evicted from the house (in 48 hours,) his art and antiques collection was dispersed. His widow survived Zholtovsky one year.

Zholtovsky's creed was that architecture and construction process are indivisible; separation of architect from construction management reduces art to draftsmanship. Yet at the same time his work on reducing construction costs and evaluating new technologies in 1950s spelled the demise of profession in the USSR. This work, pushed forward in January 1951 by Nikita Khrushchev (then City of Moscow party boss), paved the road for a switch from masonry to prefab concrete in later 1950s. Zholtovsky workshop proposed various prefab concrete drafts, mixing new technologies with Stalinist exterior; this line of architecture never materialized: Khrushchev announced his war with "architectural excesses" in November 1955, just when the concrete industry acquired enough capacity for mass construction. Zholtovsky's last apartment block (Prospect Mira, 184) was stripped of "redundancies", and in ten years that followed, architecture separated from construction management and folded down to city planning and engineering.
