= Alexei Shchusev =

Russian architect (1873–1949)

- Алексей Щусев
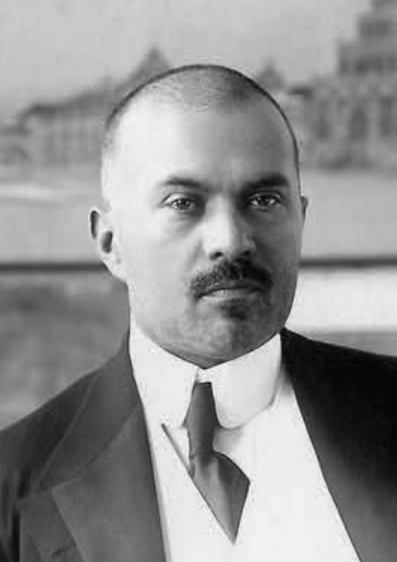
- Shchusev in 1914
- Born: 8 October 1873; Kishinev, Bessarabia Governorate, Russian Empire
- Died: 24 May 1949 (aged 75); Moscow, Russian SFSR, Soviet Union
- Education: Imperial Academy of Arts
- Occupation: Architect
- Awards: Stalin Prize first degree (1941, 1949); Stalin Prize second degree (1946, 1952 – posthumously)
- Practice: 2nd Mosproekt Workshop (1932–1937); Akademproekt (1938–1948)

Alexei Viktorovich Shchusev (Note: Also spelled Schusev (the preferred English-language spelling by the Shchusev Museum of Architecture), German: Ščusev (academic spelling), German: Schtschussew, French: Chtchoussev, Polish: Szczusiew.) (Russian: Алексей Викторович Щусев; lit: Aleksey Viktorovich Shuchusev;8 October [O.S. 26 September] 1873 – 24 May 1949) was a Russian and Soviet architect who was successful during three consecutive epochs of Russian architecture – Art Nouveau (broadly construed), Constructivism, and Stalinist architecture, being one of the few Russian architects to be celebrated under both the Romanovs and the communists, becoming the most decorated architect in terms of Stalin prizes awarded.

In the 1900s, Shchusev established himself as a church architect, and developed his proto-modernist style, which blended Art Nouveau with Russian Revival architecture. Immediately before and during World War I he designed and built railway stations for the von Meck family, notably the Kazansky Rail Terminal in Moscow. After the October Revolution, Shchusev pragmatically supported the Bolsheviks, and was rewarded with the contract for the Lenin Mausoleum. He consecutively designed and built three mausoleums, two temporary and one permanent, and supervised the latter's further expansion in the 1940s. In the 1920s and early 1930s he successfully embraced Constructivist architecture, but quickly reverted to historicism when the government deemed modernism inappropriate for the Communist state. He was one of the members of the art association 'The Four Arts', which existed in Moscow and Leningrad in 1924-1931.

His career proceeded smoothly until September 1937, when, after a brief public smear campaign, Shchusev lost all his executive positions and design contracts, and was effectively banished from architectural practice. Modern Russian historians of art agree that the charges of professional dishonesty, plagiarism, and exploitation raised against Shchusev were, for the most part, justified. In the following years he gradually returned to practice, and restored his public image as the patriarch of Stalinist architecture. The causes of his downfall and the forces behind his subsequent recovery remain unknown.

== Early years ==
Alexei Shchusev was born in Kishinev in the Russian Empire (present-day Chișinău, Moldova) as the fourth of five children in the family of a provincial civil administrator. Both his parents died when Alexei was fifteen years old. With the help of older siblings and a scholarship from the Kishinev city council, Alexei and his younger brother Pavel (1880–1957) graduated from the local gymnasium and continued their educations at the university level. (Note: All four brothers, and their half-sister from the father's first marriage, received complete university-level educations, despite coming from modest means.) Pavel, like Alexei, would become an architect and a bridge engineer; he would collaborate with Alexei on bridge projects in Moscow and be the custodian of Alexei's artwork and archive after his death.

In 1891, Alexei left Kishinev and enrolled at the Imperial Academy of Arts in Saint Petersburg. In his first years at the Academy, Shchusev attended both architecture and painting classes. In 1894, he joined the class of Leon Benois and concentrated on architecture. At about the same time, 1893 or 1894, he designed and built his first tangible project on a private estate in Bessarabia. In 1895, he took his first study tour of Central Asia, with professor Nikolay Veselovsky. In the same year, Shchusev designed and built a crypt chapel in Russo-Byzantine style at the Alexander Nevsky Lavra. Later, according to Shchusev himself, he browsed through the obituaries in a newspaper, and was making cold calls to the families of the deceased. A family member accepted his offer, and Shchusev (still an undergraduate student) received his first commission in Saint Petersburg.

In 1896, his last year at the Imperial Academy, Shchusev studied old Northern Russian architecture in Kostroma, Rostov, and Yaroslavl; and the European architecture of Romania and Austria-Hungary. The next year, he graduated from the academy with the right to a state-sponsored tour of Europe. While the paperwork for the latter was being prepared, he traveled to Kishinev to marry his fiancée, Maria Karchevskaya. He spent the winter of 1897–1898 in Samarkand, with Veselovsky, studying and documenting medieval shrines. This exposure to Islamic architecture would influence his design of the 1898 orientalist Karchevsky House in Kishinev, and later designs for Soviet-era projects built in the Caucasus, Kazakhstan, and Central Asia. In August 1898, Shchusev and his wife started their sixteen-month Grand Tour, via Vienna, Trieste, Italy to Tunisia, and then via Italy to Paris, where Shchusev studied for six months at the Académie Julian.

== Major architectural projects ==
=== Religious architecture (1900–1918) ===
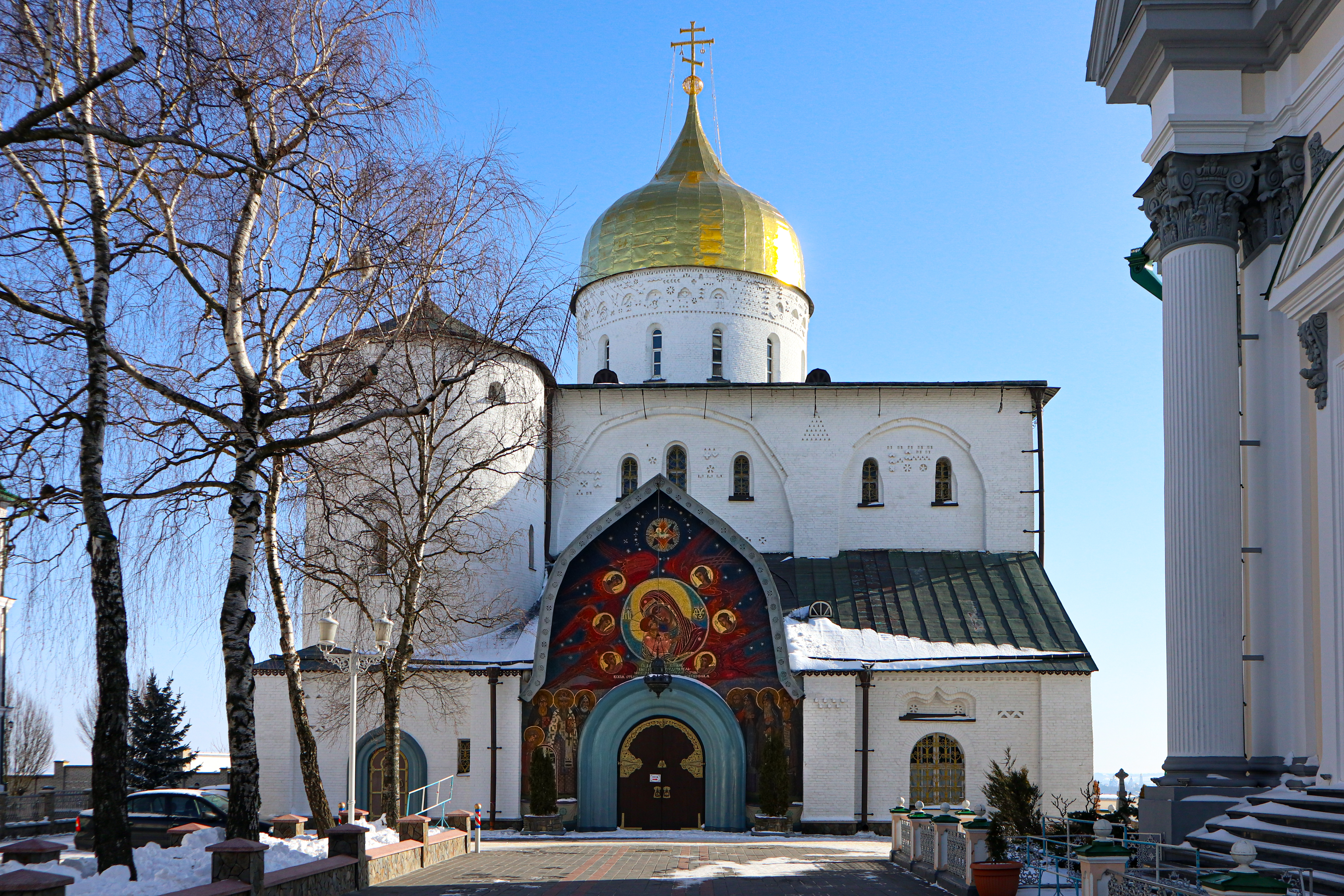
Trinity Cathedral of the Pochaev Lavra

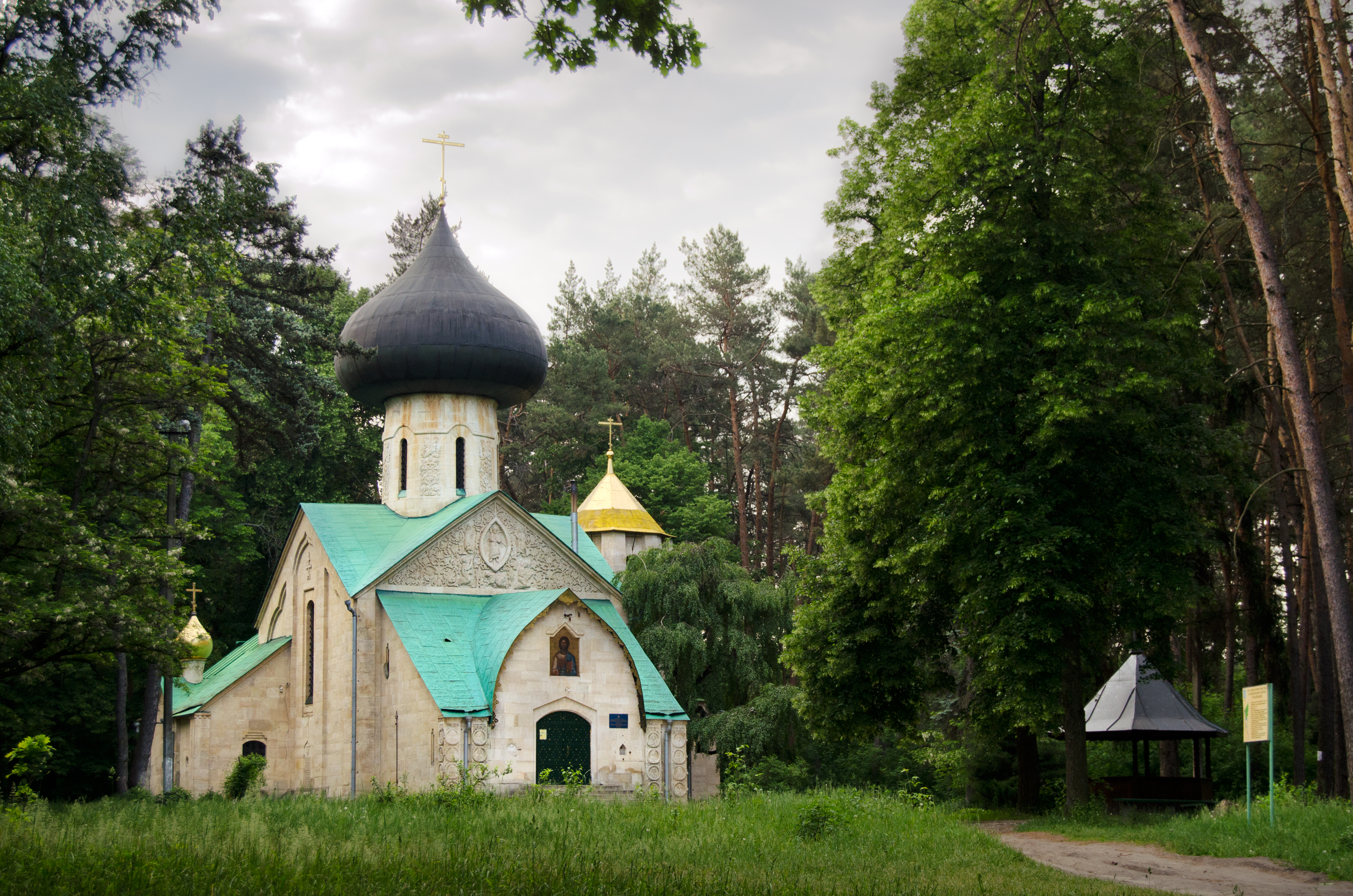
Church in Natalievka

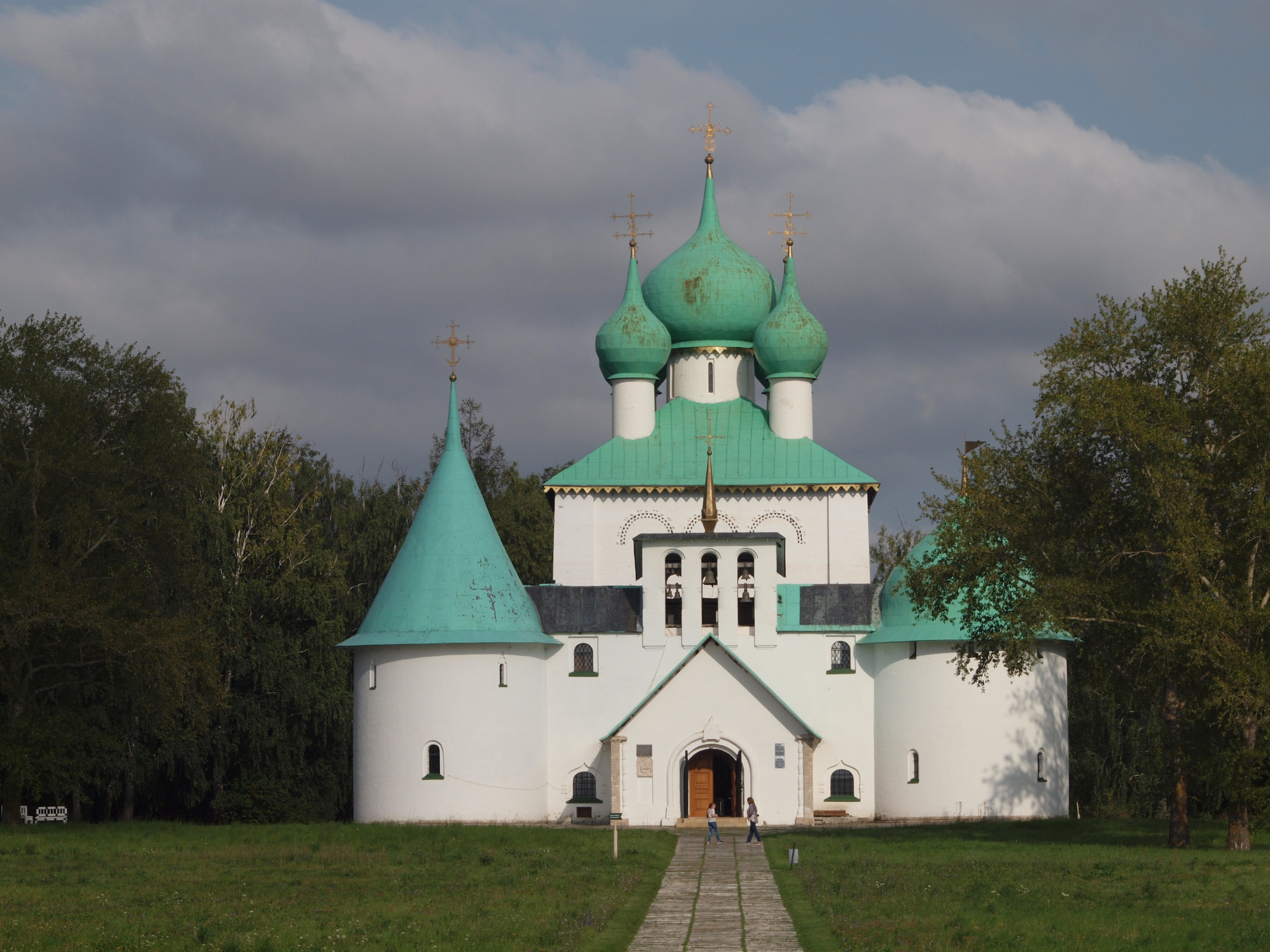
Church on the Kulikovo Field

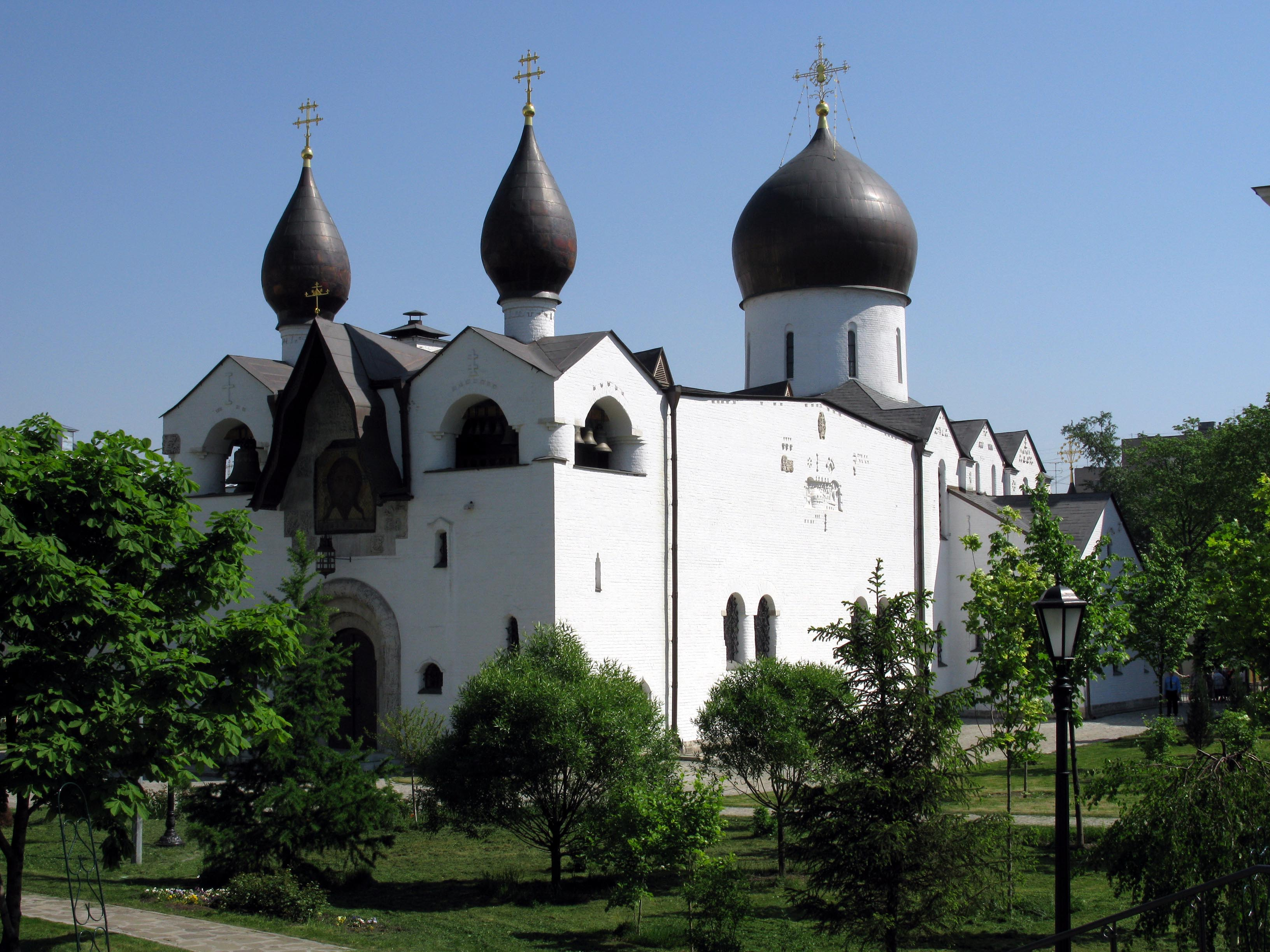
Cathedral of the Marfo-Mariinsky Convent

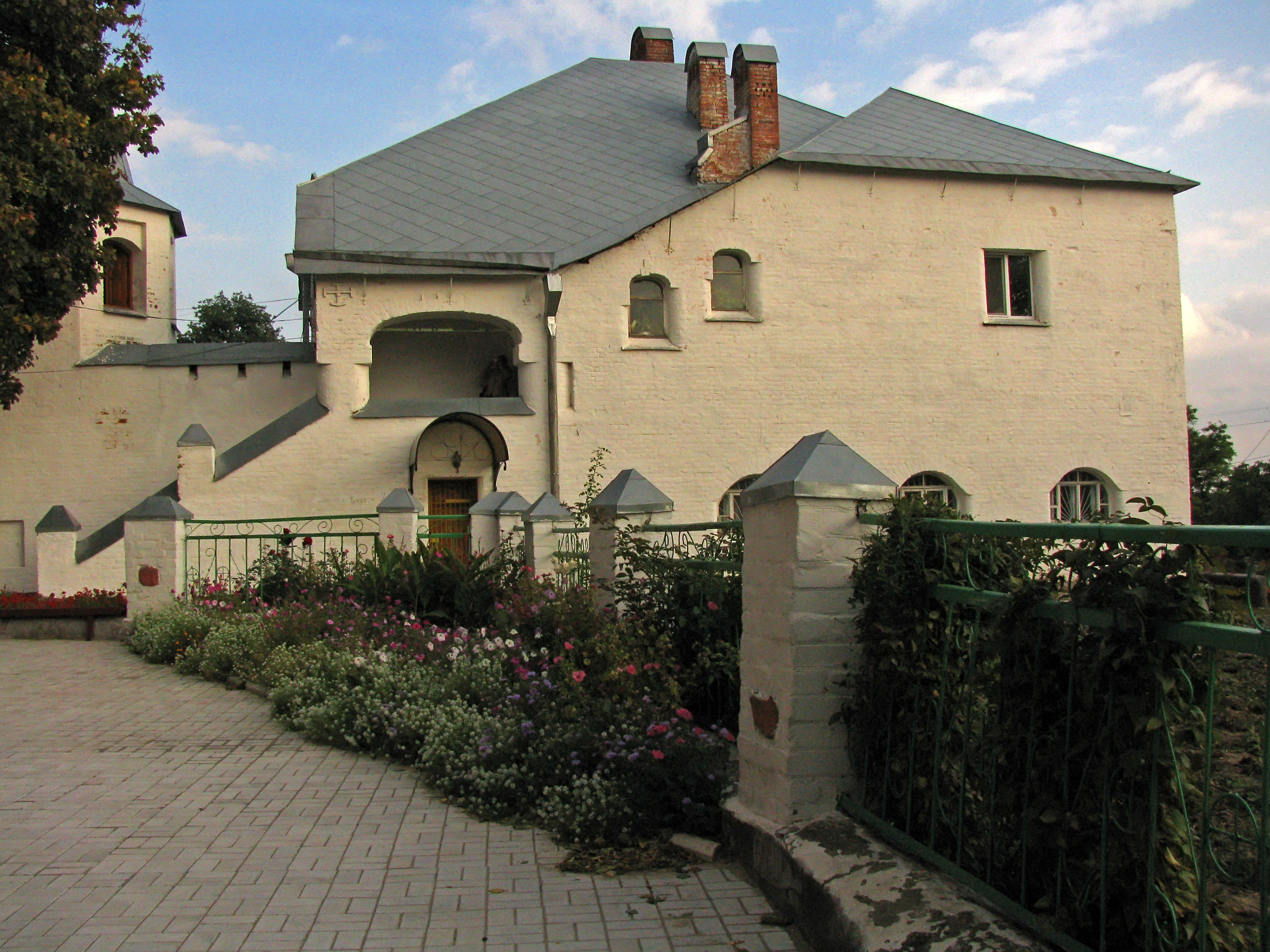
Saint Basil monastery in Ovruch

Upon returning to Saint Petersburg, Shchusev tried to set up an independent practice, but failed to find clients. His fortunes changed in 1901–1902, when his design for a new iconostasis for the main cathedral of the Kiev Pechersk Lavra was noticed approvingly by fellow architects and the Orthodox clergy. He was appointed as a consultant to the Holy Synod, and soon had the chance to assist Mikhail Nesterov with the repairs to the poorly built church in Abastumani. Nesterov was impressed, and became Shchusev's patron. Shchusev's contracts with the Kharitonenko and von Meck families and the charity of Grand Duchess Elisabeth were, to varying degrees, the result of Nesterov's recommendations. In the course of a decade, Shchusev established himself as primarily a church architect, and quickly progressed from historic styles to the creation of his own proto-modernist style, blending Art Nouveau with the Russian Revival tradition. He did not have as much luck in getting lucrative residential and government contracts; his lay buildings of the period are scarce and, as a whole, are distinctly inferior to his churches. Shchusev's church murals, influenced by the works of Viktor Vasnetsov and Mikhail Vrubel, did not impress contemporary observers either. Alexander Blok complained that they were "neither bold, nor religious".

In 1904, the Holy Synod entrusted Shchusev with the restoration of the ruined twelfth century church in Ovruch. Shchusev's controversial five-domed design in the Byzantine style was much debated by architects and preservationists, but was nevertheless approved for construction in 1907. Further debate followed; and in 1908 Shchusev was forced to submit a revised design, with the help of Pyotr Pokryshkin and Leonid Vesnin. From 1908 to 1911, the church was rebuilt, according to the revised design.

In 1905, Shchusev was commissioned to design the new cathedral at the Pochaev Lavra. The building, executed in Novgorod-Pskov medieval style, and starkly contrasting with its Ukrainian Baroque setting, was also completed in 1911. Thus, Shchusev joined the small circle of builders of very large structures during this time.

The first building to display Shchusev's distinct style was the diminutive chapel at the grave of Natalya Shabelskaya in Nice (1904–1907). Although Shchusev clearly alluded to medieval Vladimir-Suzdal architecture, he carefully avoided rote stylization. Instead of merely copying his sources, he created his own free-flowing visual language. This approach, common in Art Nouveau and in the nascent modernism, was radically different from contemporary revivalist practice. Another personal touch, already present in the Pochaev Cathedral, (Note: The northern apse of the Trinity cathedral, shaped like a fortress tower, is distinctly taller than the others) is the deliberate asymmetry of Shchusev's churches. One facade of the church may look perfectly symmetrical, while the other is distinctly irregular. According to Andrey Ikonnikov, in the beginning Shchusev merely imitated the irregularities of medieval churches, but soon went beyond what he found in historical sources and elevated asymmetry and irregularity to an almost grotesque level.

According to Dmitry Chmelnizki, the best example of this style is the Saint Basil Monastery in Ovruch, designed in 1907–1909 and completed in 1910: "the strictly functional floorplan, nearly absolute absence of direct borrowings, and the freedom in the treatment of form foreshadow Shchusev's constructivist buildings... thoroughly modern, in spite of clear allusions to Old Russian architecture". According to biographer Kirill Afanasyev, the most visually striking is the small church on the Natalievka estate, conceived as a private museum of Russian icons. The best known of Shchusev's churches, and arguably one of the best works of Russian Art Nouveau is the cathedral of the Marfo-Mariinsky Convent in Moscow, which Shchusev designed in collaboration with Nesterov in 1908 and completed in 1912. Prior to the outbreak of World War I, Shchusev also designed and built churches in Bari and Sanremo, in Italy; in Cuhureshti in Moldova; and on the Kulikovo Field in Southern Russia. The last building to be completed before 1918 was the church of the Brotherhood Cemetery, which was built during the war to administer last rites to the dying soldiers and was demolished in the 1940s.

The stylistic classification of Shchusev's churches in Soviet and Russian literature has been heavily influenced by politics. For most of the Soviet period, Art Nouveau was despised as a decadent movement. Stalin-era critics avoided references to Art Nouveau altogether, presenting Shchusev's work as an indigenous, patriotic, and "progressive" art. The official brief biography, written in 1948 for an American audience, omitted church designs altogether.

Late Soviet theory, as outlined by Ikonnikov, placed Shchusev at the evolutionary end of the Neorussian style that emerged around 1880 in the works of Victor Vasnetsov and the Abramtsevo art colony. The style, very different from the "official" Russian Revival, was further developed by Fyodor Schechtel, who introduced the ideas of Finnish Art Nouveau, and ultimately peaked in the works of Shchusev and Vladimir Pokrovsky. Pokrovsky leaned to a "true" recreation of the medieval spirit, while Shchusev was more responsive to Art Nouveau influences. According to Ikonnikov, Shchusev stood above Pokrovsky, due to a combination of his natural intuitive talent, first-hand knowledge of world architecture, and experience in archaeological research. Works by "second-tier" architects such as Ilya Bondarenko were markedly inferior to those of either Shchusev or Pokrovsky.

=== Railway architecture (1911–1930s) ===
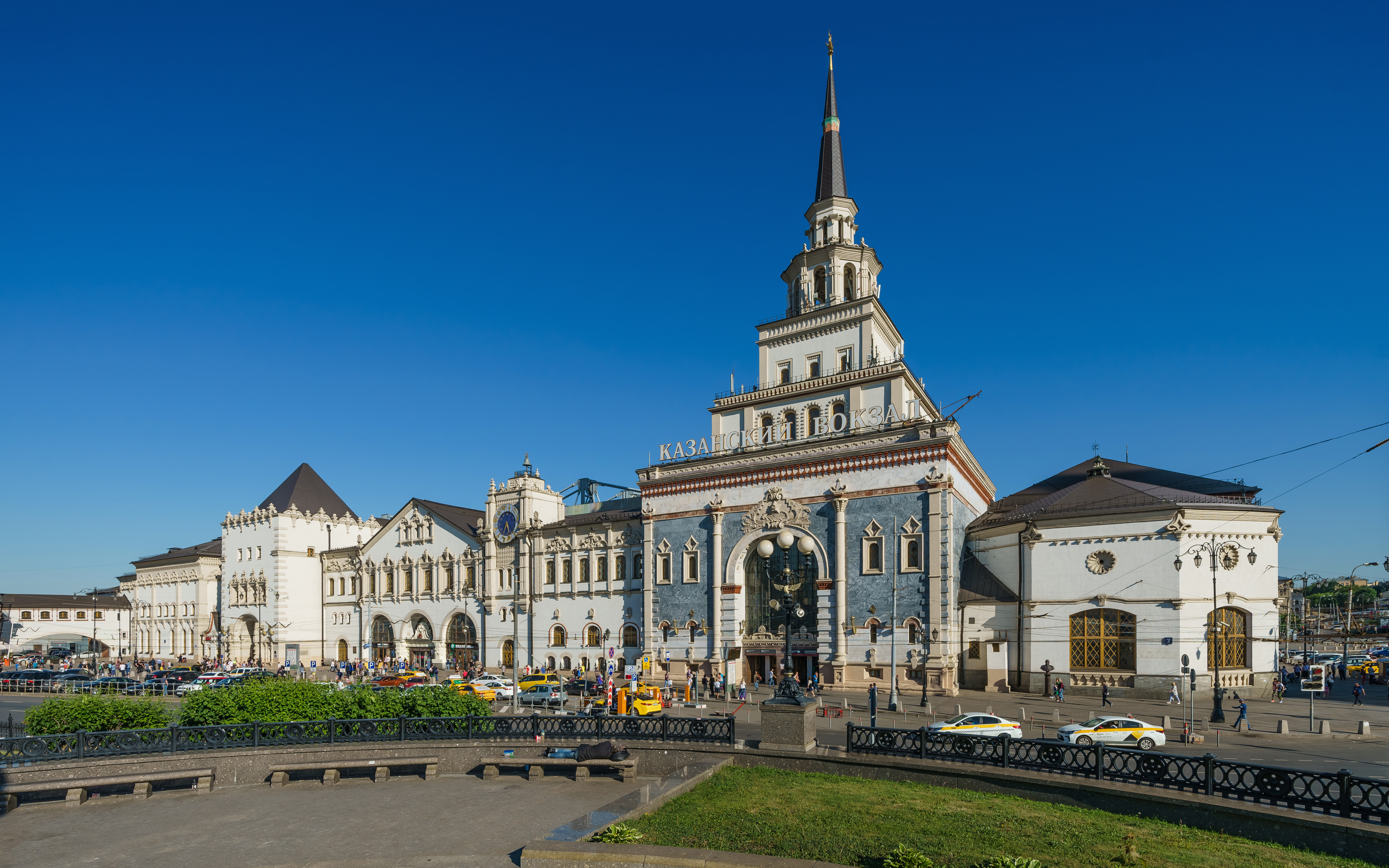
The completed Kazansky Terminal in 2019

In 1911, Shchusev won an invitational competition with his design of the Kazansky rail terminal in Moscow. Work on the proposal continued for at least three more years; the first relatively complete elevations were published in 1913. While the 1911 plans tended toward Shchusev's free-flowing church style, the final result was different. Shchusev decided to break the 220 meter long facade into an asymmetric row of visually separate pavilions, and to use Naryshkin Baroque styling. He visited old towns to study their extant baroque architecture, and used the knowledge thus gained in his design for the exterior of the new building. The design for the staggered corner tower borrows from the Söyembikä Tower and the Borovitskaya Tower, and is at the same time distinctly unique. The clock tower and the clock itself were influenced by St Mark's Clocktower in Venice.

Functionally, the terminal was compromised by cost cuts. Although Shchusev preferred a two-storey floorplan for easier separation and distribution of passenger flow, the client insisted on a cheaper single-storey plan. Construction began in 1913 but was interrupted by World War I and the revolutions of 1917. The team of artists and craftsmen, which united almost all of the Mir iskusstva group, fell apart; but Shchusev managed to retain the core of his architectural assistants. Painter Eugene Lanceray, one of the few reliable sources on the inner workings of the Shchusev firm, stayed with it until the end of his life. It took until 1926 to complete and commission the first part of the terminal; the western facade was finished in 1940. The last part of the original plan was not built until the 1990s. Shchusev's firm also designed adjacent service buildings and the elevated viaduct of the nearby Alekseevskaya railway line that serves as a picture frame for the terminal.

In 1914–1916, Shchusev also designed a series of station buildings for the new railroad lines in the Upper Volga region. Most of the lesser stations followed a standardized design inspired by Petrine and Elizabethan Baroque. The larger stations, in Krasnoufimsk and Sergach, were styled in Elizabethan Baroque and the Russian version of the Empire style, respectively.

=== Lenin's Mausoleum (1924, 1929–1930, 1940s) ===
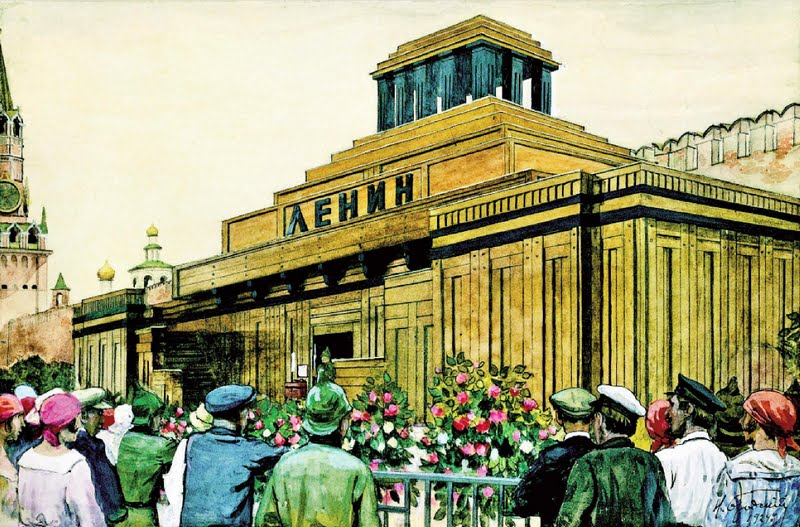
The second (wooden) Lenin Mausoleum

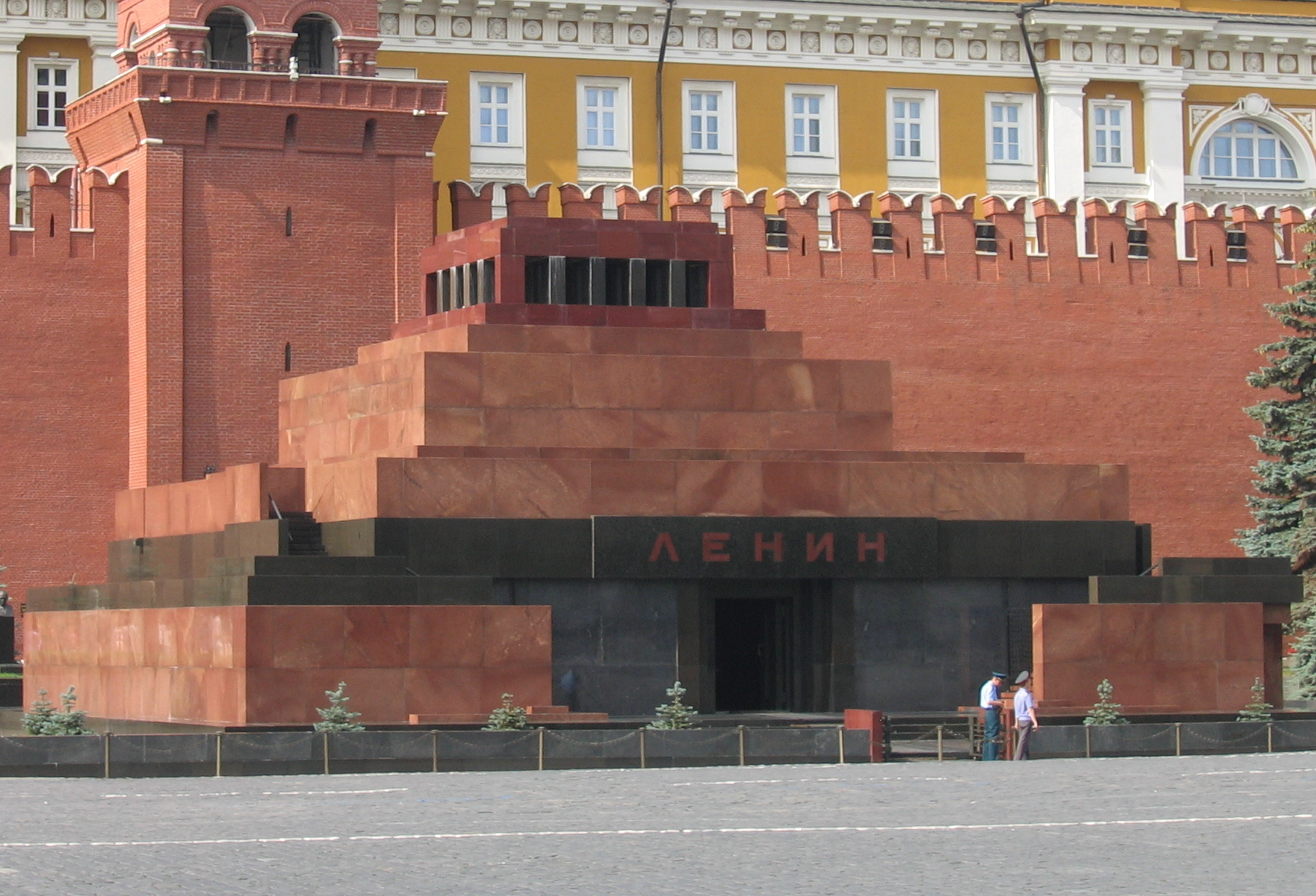
The third (permanent) Lenin Mausoleum. Typically for Shchusev, the two corners of the stylobate are asymmetrical

During the Russian Civil War, Shchusev stayed in Moscow, collaborating with the Bolshevik authorities on urban planning matters. By 1921, he had become the informal doyen of Moscow's community of old-school architects, and was elected chairman of their association, the Moscow Architectural Society (MAO). His tangible projects of the early 1920s—the 1922–1923 propylaea on Tverskaya Square, the pavilions of the 1923 All-Russian Exhibition of Agriculture and Domestic Industry, and the two temporary Lenin mausoleums of 1924—were not meant to last, and were demolished by the end of the decade.

On the night of 22–23 January 1924, Shchusev was summoned to the Kremlin to receive the most important commission of his life, the design of the Lenin Mausoleum. (Note: All sources regarding this episode ultimately trace to Shchusev's own account published in the Soviet Union in 1937.) The reasons for choosing Shchusev remain unknown. Dmitry Chmelnizki speculates that, regardless of Shchusev's conservative planning policies, he had already become "the architect closest to the Communist Party elite". The first, temporary, wooden mausoleum was designed overnight and erected in three days, at temperatures reaching −30 °C. Due to a lack of time and resources, Shchusev's original proposal was scaled down to a bare minimum. The resulting makeshift hut was too small for its intended role as a communist shrine; thus in March 1924 Shchusev was commanded to design and build a larger temporary structure that could also function as a tribune for the use of government officials. The second wooden mausoleum was built in April and opened to visitors in August 1924.

Five years later, the government decided that the concept "had passed the test of time", and awarded Shchusev a contract to design a third, permanent mausoleum. An early proposal by Shchusev and Isidor Frantsuz was conspicuously asymmetric, with a circular tribune at the front left corner. The government rejected it and instructed the architects to follow the pattern of the wooden mausoleum. The resulting design, credited to Shchusev, Frantsuz, and interior designer G. K. Yakovlev, was built in sixteen months in 1929–1930. An urban legend, supported by local historian Alexei Klimenko, asserts that the Mausoleum was designed solely by Frantsuz. Subsequent research reinstated Shchusev to his rightful place; it is, however, true that during the design process Shchusev often traveled out of Moscow, leaving Frantsuz as the de facto lead architect.

Typically for Shchusev, the approved design changed many times during construction. Initially, Shchusev wanted to dress the cast-in-place concrete frame in black porphyry, to create an illusion of a perfect monolith. The opportunity was lost when the architects replaced most of the porphyry with granite. (Note: Porphyry was used only for the black "waistline" into which the contrasting letters ΛЕНИН (LENIN) are inlaid. The rest of the structure is dressed in granite.) Shchusev created an illusion that the Mausoleum is made of solid granite blocks, when in reality it is primarily concrete covered with thin granite panels. This third mausoleum, superficially similar to its predecessor, disposed with pilasters and fluted panels; while the second wooden Mausoleum had leaned to simplified neoclassicism, the third was certainly influenced by the Russian avant-garde. Like Shchusev's churches, the mausoleum is distinctly and deliberately asymmetrical, although the asymmetry escapes the notice of casual observers. (Note: The front right corner of the mausoleum has a recessed niche, which is absent from the front left corner. The architect reasoned that visitors, approaching the entrance from the right, should not face a sharp massive corner. Thus, he removed the latter when the construction was largely complete.)

Although the building exterior, and the image of Lenin's sarcophagus inside, became the symbols of Soviet Moscow, very little is known about the subterranean core of the Mausoleum. As of 2021, its floor plans, structural and vertical layout remain classified. A single 1930 publication revealed that the as-built internal volume of the third Mausoleum encompassed 2,400 cubic metres (85,000 cu ft), suggesting that there already was a spacious underground compound. Further expansion followed in 1939–1946, but the only visible changes, credited solely to Shchusev, were the redesign of Lenin's sarcophagus and the government tribunal.

=== Constructivist projects (1923–1932) ===
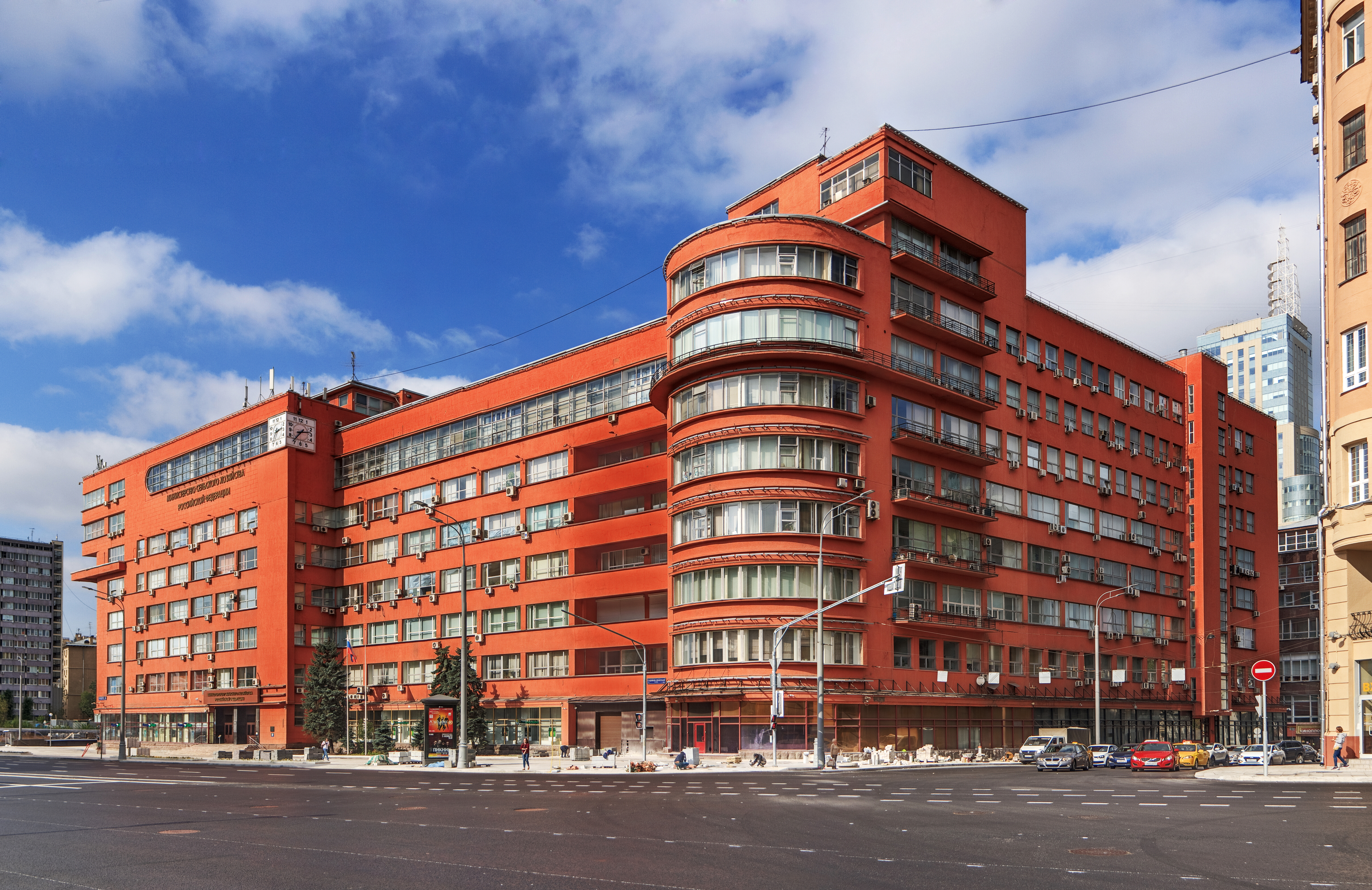
The Narkomzem building

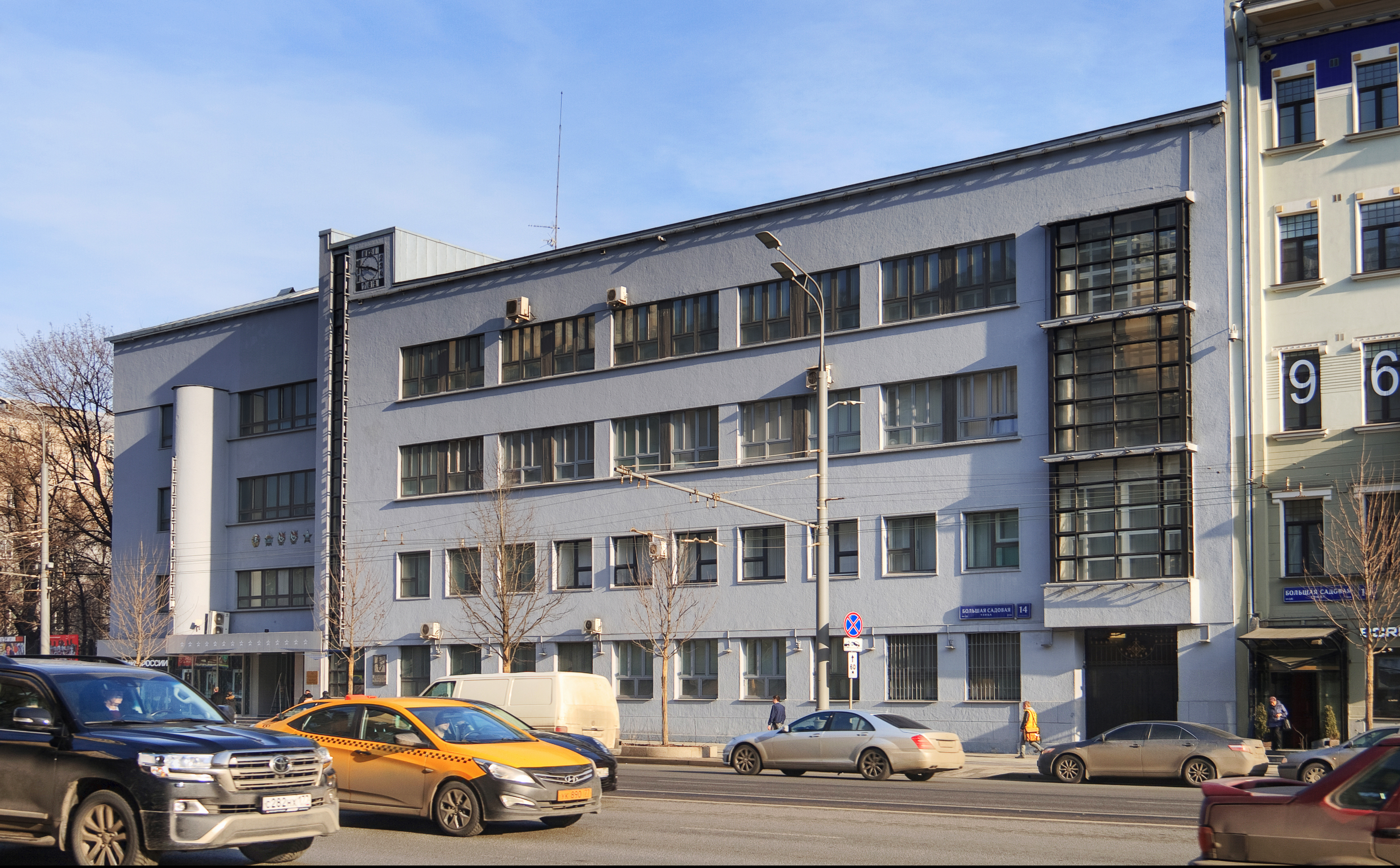
The Military Transport Academy building

Around 1923–1924, Shchusev embraced the rising constructivism movement. He supported the new school in public, but never allied himself with constructivism sensu stricto, which comprised a small group engaged in endless rivalries with other avant-garde factions. Shchusev expressly warned against superficial imitations of modernist ideas with inappropriate materials and for inappropriate functions. His first building of the constructivist period, the railway workers' club adjacent to the Kazansky terminal, was a transitional design that contravened his own warnings. The exterior decor is a coarse imitation of Baroque, intended to blend with the historicist terminal; but the expressive uncluttered floorplan is certainly modernist.

In 1925, Shchusev took part in three high-profile architectural competitions: to design the Gosprom in Kharkiv, the Central Telegraph, and the State Bank in Moscow. All three of Shchusev's proposals were distinctly constructivist, and all three lost to other entrants. In 1928–29, Shchusev lost another competition, to design the Lenin Library in Moscow. This time, he produced two proposals with almost identical floorplans. The first proposal featured a symmetrical neoclassical facade, and was rejected as "outdated". The second was strikingly modernist, leaning more to the works of Le Corbusier and Erich Mendelsohn, rather than Russian constructivism. The rival team of Vladimir Shchuko and Vladimir Helfreich went in the reverse direction, from modernism to Art Deco; the latter proposal won the contest. Avant-garde groups unanimously condemned "stylistic double-dealing" by both Shchusev and Shchuko. Contempt for Shchusev's indiscriminate "omnivoracity" persisted for decades, even making its way into a 1985 Soviet college textbook. Even Nesterov complained that Shchusev was all about stylization rather than style.

Shchusev's first completed constructivist buildings—a sanatorium in Matsesta and a compact residential building in Moscow—were conceived in 1927 and built in 1928. The largest of his constructivist designs, the Narkomzem Building in Moscow, was conceived in 1928–1929 and completed in 1933. The true authorship of the building's design, which was probably influenced by the Schocken building in Stuttgart, cannot be resolved. All sources credit its design to Alexander Grinberg and Shchusev. Grinberg stepped aside at an early stage of the project; Shchusev managed the construction personally. Three men of Shchusev's team produced most of the drafts, but only two (Frantsuz and Yakovlev) were credited as junior co-authors.

One of Shchusev's last constructivist building in Moscow, the Military Transport Academy, was designed in 1929–1930 and completed in 1934. According to Dmitry Chmelnizki, it was "one of Shchusev's best works... True modern architecture – rational, restrained, serious and finely drawn". Finally, in 1930 Shchusev designed two constructivist hotel buildings for Intourist. The hotel in Batumi was completed in 1934, the hotel in Baku in 1938. The recently established Intourist was operated by the NKVD, so these hotels were rarely mentioned by Soviet media. It is not possible to trace the beginning of Shchusev's collaboration with Lavrentiy Beria to these projects; however, as the chief of the Transcaucasian communist party organization, Beria was, ex officio, Shchusev's direct client.

=== Early Stalinist period (1932–1937) ===
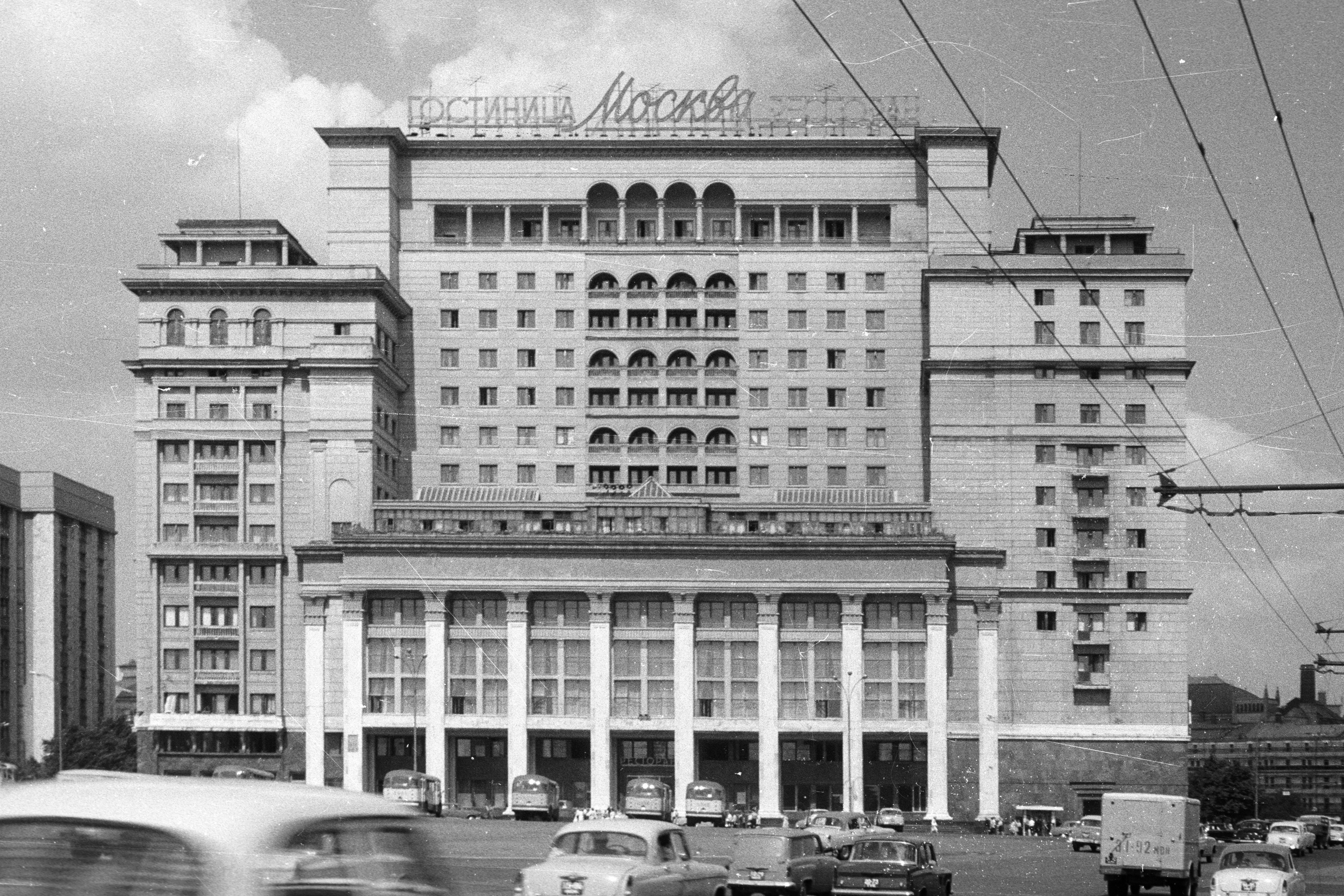
The Moscow Hotel in 1966

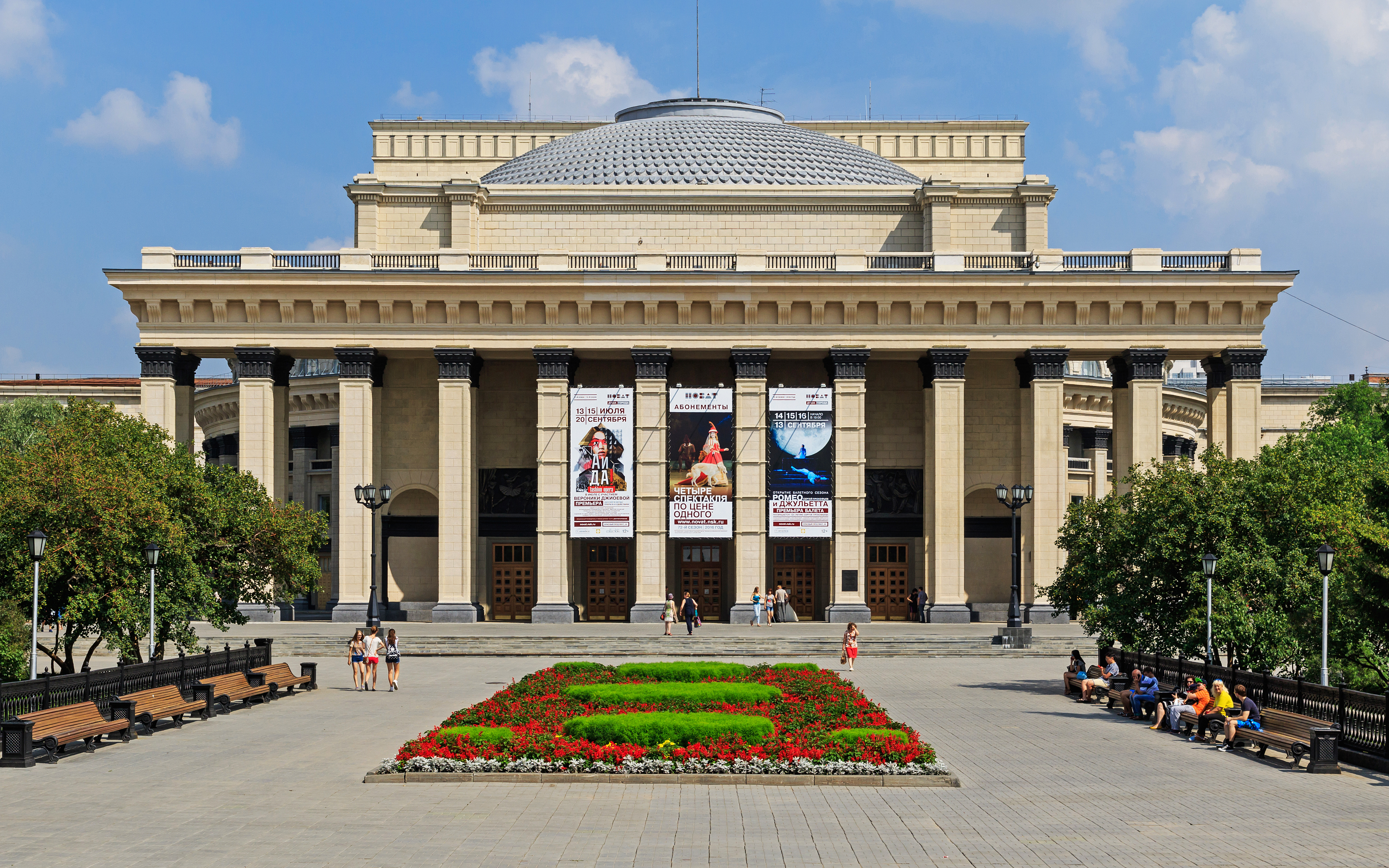
The Novosibirsk Opera facade

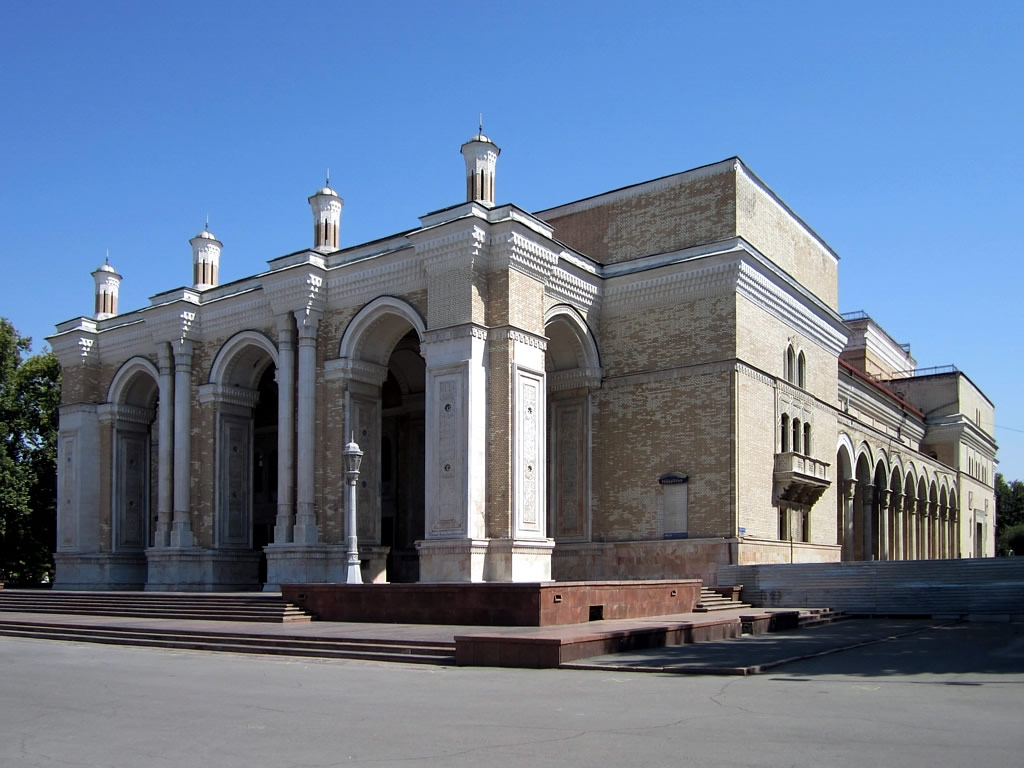
The Navoi Theatre in Tashkent

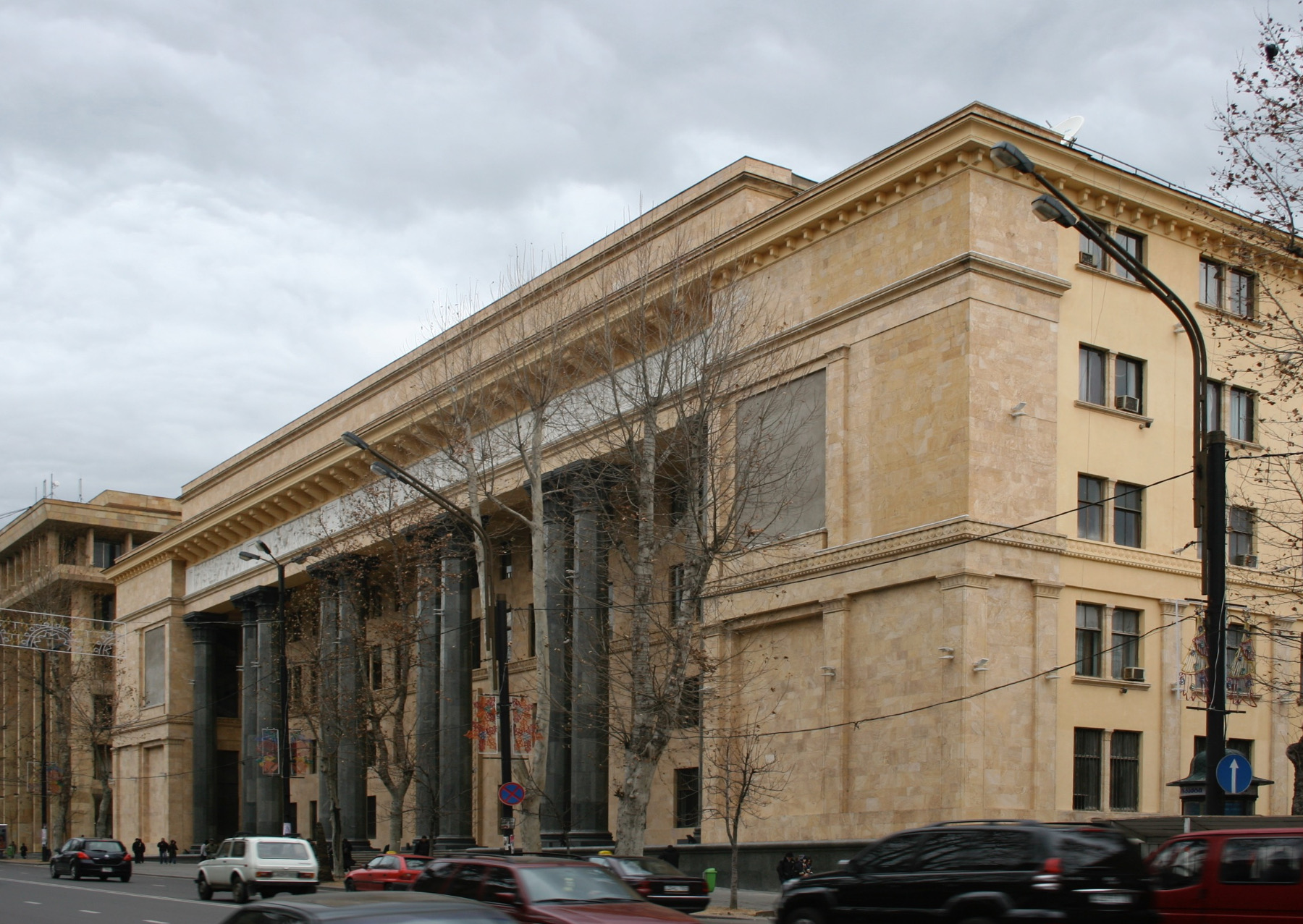
The IMEL building in Tbilisi

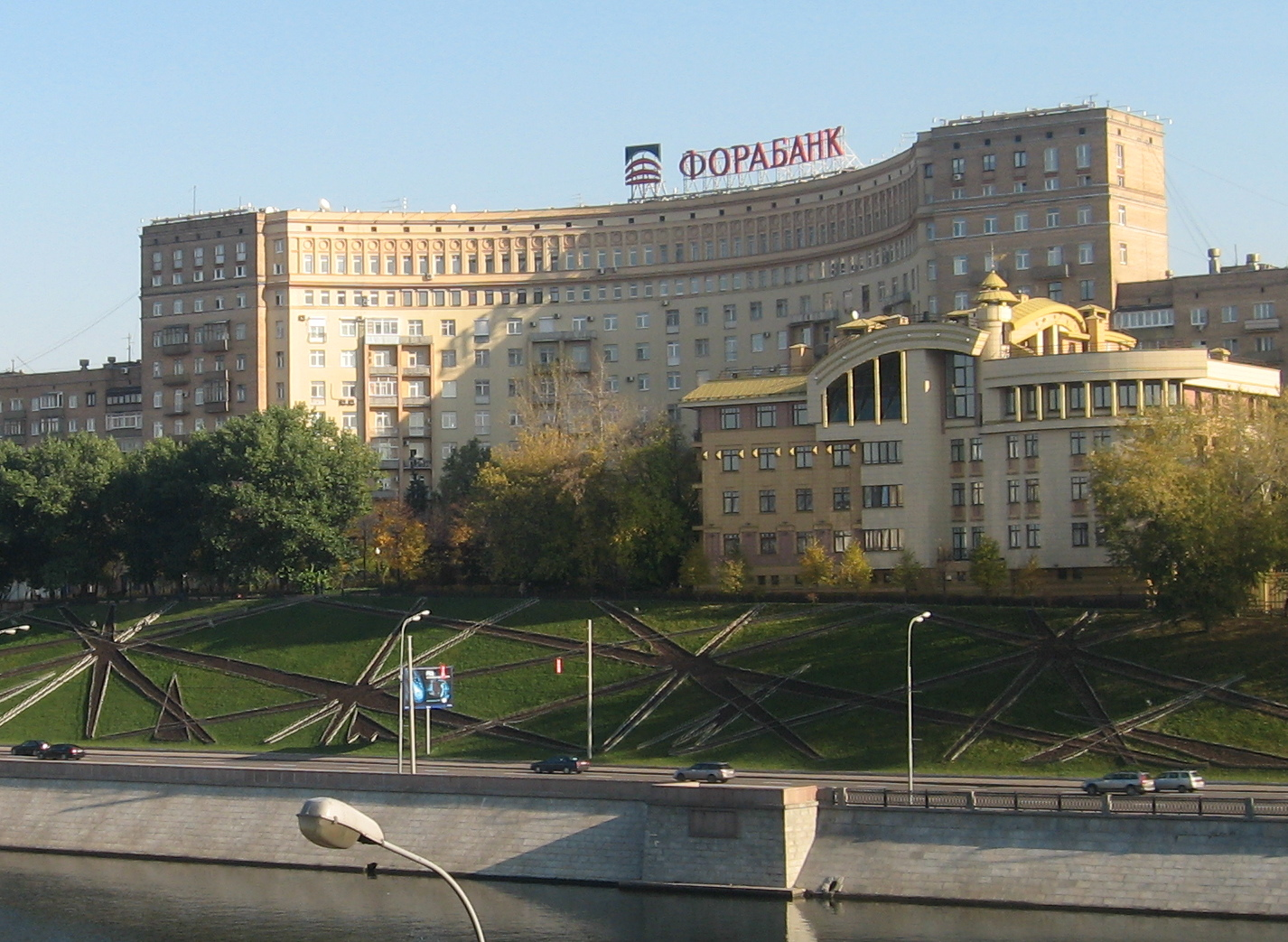
The Architects' House in Moscow (background)

The architectural competition for the Palace of the Soviets, held in four stages in 1931–1933, coincided with the sharp turn of Soviet architecture from the modernism of the 1920s to the monumental historicism of Stalinist architecture. Shchusev's drafts, published in 2001, indicate that he had probably anticipated the stylistic revolution as early as 1931. His first entry in the competition, though, was thoroughly modernist, reminiscent of Le Corbusier, and fairly modest in size. Critics complained that it "did not look like a palace". Shchusev wisely skipped the second, most publicized stage of the contest. His entries in the third and the fourth stages were properly neoclassical but uninspiring. Joseph Stalin had already made his choice in favor of Boris Iofan, and was suspicious of Shchusev's motives: "Shchusev's project is the same Cathedral of Christ the Saviour, but without the cross. Perhaps, Shchusev hopes to add a cross at a later date..."

In 1933, the formerly independent architectural firms of Moscow were nationalized and reorganized into ten state-owned workshops. Shchusev was appointed the head of the 2nd State Workshop, a fairly large design firm employing dozens of professional architects and engineers. Some—such as Dmitry Chechulin, Alexei Rukhlyadev, and the tandem of Leonid Savelyev and Oswald Stapran—were managing their own project teams. The remaining staff formed Shchusev's personal team, a "firm within a firm".

While the competitions for the Palace of the Soviets were still unfolding, Shchusev was instructed to take over ongoing high-profile Constructivist projects, and to redesign and complete them in "neoclassical style". The first three victims of Stalinist "improvement" were the giant theatre in Novosibirsk (original design by Alexander Grinberg, 1928–1931); the Meyerhold Theatre in Moscow (Mikhail Barkhin, Sergey Vakhtangov, and Vsevolod Meyerhold, 1930–1931); and the Moscow Hotel (Leonid Savelyev and Oswald Stapran, 1931).

In the case of the Moscow Hotel, Shchusev's takeover was publicly explained as being necessary due to the inexperience of Savelyev and Stapran, who had allegedly made too many design errors and failed to correct them. According to Chmelnizki, Savelyev and Stapran were sufficiently competent to complete their original design; but, like most graduates of the Vkhutemas, they lacked the classical visual arts education that was a prerequisite to "stylistic improvements". Thus, in April–May 1932 the government appointed Shchusev and Bruno Taut as joint project managers. (Note: The decisions were formally announced through Moscow city hall) By the end of the year, Taut dropped out; and Shchusev assumed full responsibility. The first part of the hotel, modified according to Shchusev's design, was opened in December 1935. The longer, northwestern facade received positive reviews, but the taller and shorter southwestern facade came in for much criticism due to its proportions and conspicuously asymmetric decor. This time, asymmetry was a forced ad hoc response to the structural weakness of the former Grand Hotel building, which had been incorporated into the new hotel. The theaters in Novosibirsk and Moscow were less fortunate. The former was completed to Shchusev's exterior design in 1945, losing Grinberg's interior innovations in the process. The latter was completed to a nondescript design by Dmitry Chechulin in 1940, as Tchaikovsky Hall.

In 1934–1936, Shchusev's workshop proposed a large number of lavish, eclectic, and sometimes utterly improbable buildings for Moscow, foreshadowing the late Stalinist style of the post-war years. Only one of them would be built. A theater in Tashkent, designed during the same period, would be built in the 1940s, in a simplified, scaled-down form. Shchusev fared much better in the Caucasus region. In 1933, he won a competition for the Institute of Marx-Engels-Lenin (IMEL) in Tbilisi. The project, sponsored and supervised by Beria, was completed in 1938 and instantly became a benchmark of Stalinist architecture. It is distantly reminiscent of the 1913 Hill Auditorium by Albert Kahn, although the connection may be purely coincidental.

=== Disgrace and recovery (1937–1938) ===
On 30 August 1937, at the peak of the Great Purge, Pravda published an exposé by Savelyev and Stapran accusing Shchusev of plagiarism, dishonesty, "counter-revolutionary mindset", and "harbouring the enemies of the state". Within a week, the smear campaign escalated into a public mobbing. New accusations ranged from "anti-soviet physiognomy" to having had contacts with the executed Mikhail Tukhachevsky, and multiple counts of intentional wrecking. Karo Alabyan, the leader of the Stalinist Union of Soviet Architects, arranged a "unanimous indignation" by its Moscow cell, and expelled Shchusev from the Union. Dmitry Chechulin, Shchusev's trusted deputy at the workshop, joined the "purge frenzy", along with many of his former associates. By the end of September, Shchusev had been dismissed from all his managerial positions; his chair of the 2nd State Workshop passed to Chechulin. The new boss immediately fired those who sympathized with Shchusev, and distributed his ongoing projects to other assistants. Very few people, notably Eugene Lanceray and Viktor Vesnin, dared to defend Shchusev in public. The magazines released in October reviewed Shchusev's IMEL building favorably but did not mention the architect's name.

According to Hugh Hudson and Karl Schlögel, the attack on Shchusev was orchestrated by Alabyan in an attempt to subdue independent professionals who stood in the way of the Union of Soviet Architects. The campaign killed lesser known urbanists Solomon Lisagor and Mikhail Okhitovich; but, according to Schlögel, its true target was the older generation of established architects, such as Shchusev. Mark Meerovich agrees with the motive, but does not name Alabyan, or any particular person. According to Dmitry Chmelnizki, neither the people behind the attack, nor their motives can be established with any certainty. One possible pretext, mentioned in Nikita Khrushchev's memoirs, was Shchusev's public compassion for the recently executed Iona Yakir. (Note: Yakir, like Shchusev, was born and raised in Kishinev. Shchusev was well familiar with Yakir's uncle, a respected local physician.) Khrushchev wrote that "all this was reported to Stalin, but Stalin restrained himself and made no move against Shchusev". Alternatively, the persecution could have been provoked by Shchusev's conflict with Vyacheslav Molotov in June 1937.

Shchusev disappeared from public and, according to his assistant Irina Sinyova, locked himself in his study in Moscow. The state made no attempt to prosecute him; according to Chmelnizki, the more established architects were usually exempt from the reign of terror that ravaged all levels of Soviet society. A few months later, the president of the Academy of Sciences Vladimir Komarov quietly awarded Shchusev the contract for the design of the academy headquarters, with sufficient funding to relaunch his design workshop. According to Sinyova, Komarov acted with the prior consent of the Council of People's Commissars. The government did not denounce the charges made against Shchusev, but tacitly agreed to give him a second chance. The smear campaign instantly waned. In July 1938, Schusev's new workshop was reorganized as the Akademproekt Institute, a state-owned firm nominally charged with the design of various academy projects. In the ten years that followed, Shchusev designed various academy institute buildings in Moscow and the building of the Kazakhstan Academy of Sciences in Almaty. However, the designs for the main building of the academy, which Shchusev worked on until his death, remained a fruitless exercise in visionary architecture.

The Akademproekt was the creation of Lavrentiy Beria, Shchusev's former client in the Caucasus. Dmitry Chmelnizki speculates that in the autumn of 1937 Shchusev fled Moscow for the Caucasus (Note: By this time, Shchusev has developed diabetes mellitus and asthma. Regardless of the mobbing campaign, he enjoyed living in the South which gave him temporary physical relief.) to appeal directly to Beria, and that Beria indeed helped the architect with the academy contract. When Beria was appointed the chief of the NKVD, the Akademproekt became the NKVD's in-house design firm and received contracts for the expansion of the Lubyanka Building and the Lenin Mausoleum. After World War II, Beria left the NKVD to supervise the Soviet atomic bomb project, and the Akademproekt concentrated on top-secret research facilities such as the future Kurchatov Institute. The connection between Beria and Shchusev was rumoured for decades. While Dmitry Chmelnizki takes it for granted, biographer Alexander Vaskin disagrees. According to Vaskin, the hypothesis is "interesting" and "plausible"; but there is very little direct evidence. The only certain fact is that Shchusev was a frequent guest at Beria's residence.

=== Wartime and post-war projects (1941–1949) ===
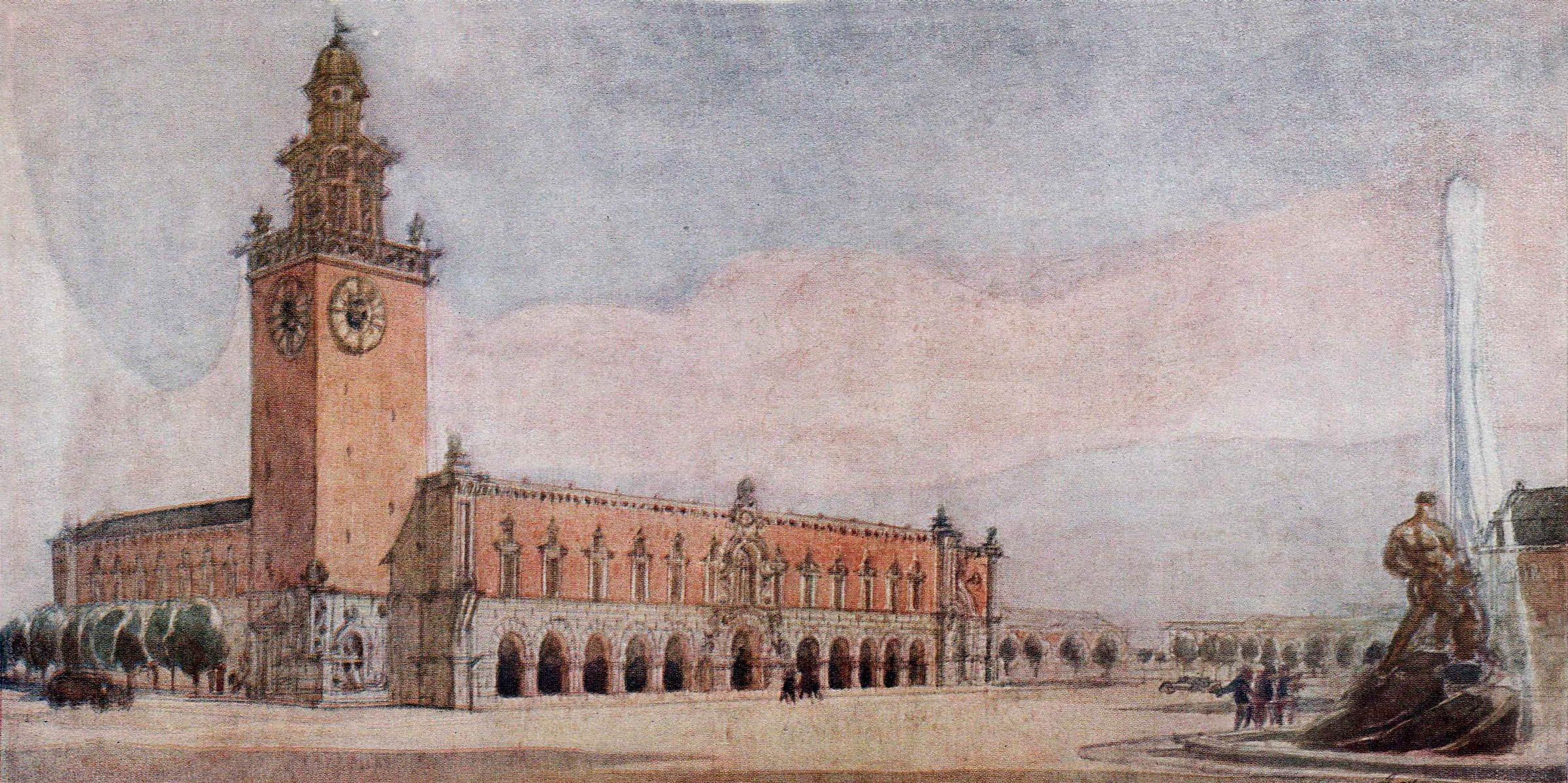
Eugene Lanceray. Reconstruction of Istra, main square and city hall. Watercolor, 1942. (Note: This is one of many drawings signed by Shchusev (signature cropped out in this scan but well visible in the book) but reliably attributed to Lanceray.)

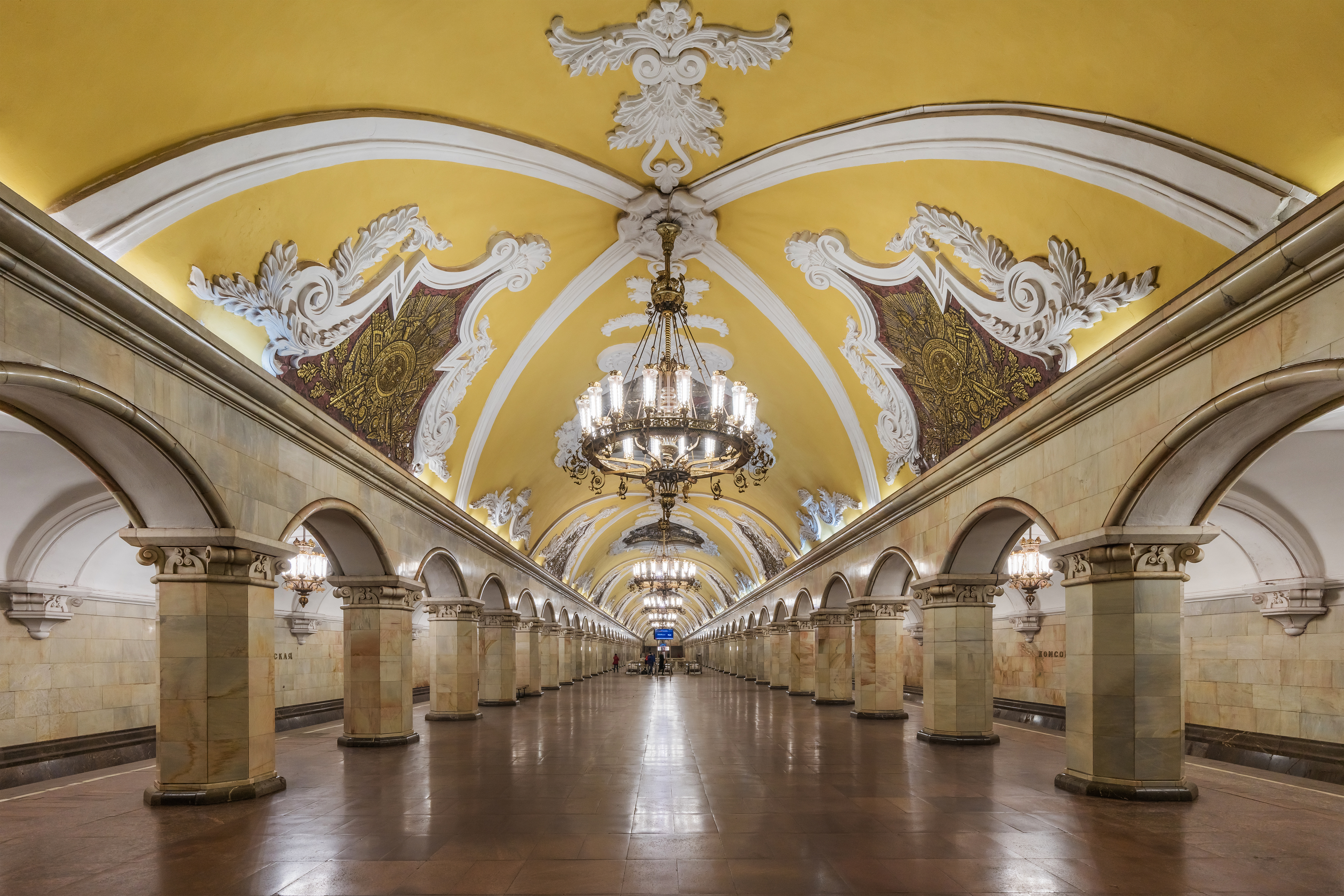
Komsomolskaya-Koltsevaya metro station

Shortly after the beginning of Operation Barbarossa, Anastas Mikoyan summoned Shchusev to fortify the Lenin Mausoleum against German airstrikes. Shchusev decided that the task was technically impossible, and Lenin's body was evacuated to Siberia. Little is known about Shchusev's other emergency assignments until the erection of the temporary war trophy pavilion in Gorky Park (1941–1942). The "unexpectedly effective" wooden structure strangely combined expressiveness with mandatory monumentality.

In September 1942, (Note: Shchusev's arrival at Istra coincided with the farthest advance of the Case Blue offensive and the early stages of the Battle of Stalingrad.) Shchusev, Lanceray, and their assistants came to Istra, a small war-torn town situated between Moscow and the Rzhev salient. (Note: The Germans evacuated the Rzhev Salient in May 1943. Even then, the frontline passed within less than 300 kilometres (190 mi) from Moscow, and around 250 kilometres (160 mi) from Istra. The Red Army had won around one hundred kilometres more in the Smolensk offensives in August–October 1943, and then the frontline stabilized until the summer of 1944.) A few months later Shchusev proposed to rebuild Istra into an exclusive winter skiing resort. The new city hall, designed by Lanceray, looked suspiciously similar to Stockholm City Hall, at approximately the same size but with a Naryshkin Baroque exterior. The city hall was surrounded by wildly decorated hotels and outlying wooden tourist lodges with luxurious interiors. The purpose of this fantastic, improbable, yet highly publicized proposal remains unexplained. According to Chmelnizki, it could have been a study for a closed city, probably related to the military intelligence facilities near Istra. The city hall was a fantasy meant to deceive, but various lesser, low-cost buildings were not, and several were actually built near the New Jerusalem Monastery.

In 1943–1948, Shchusev worked on projects for restoring Stalingrad, Novgorod, Kishinev, Tuapse, and Khreshchatyk Street in Kiev. These projects were planned not at Akademproekt but at a special state-owned workshop for urban redevelopment. The Akademproekt, expanded through the hire of Shchusev's former associates, was overloaded with ongoing projects and new defense contracts. The former included expansion of the Lenin Mausoleum, the new Lubyanka Building styled after the Palazzo della Cancelleria in Rome, and Academy of Sciences projects in Moscow, Moscow Oblast, and Almaty, which were standard, unremarkable Stalinist edifices with perfectly symmetrical floorplans and central porticos. In 1947, when the government announced plans to construct a series of skyscrapers in Moscow, Shchusev applied for the contract to design the future Hotel Ukraina, but lost to the team of Arkady Mordvinov and Vyacheslav Oltarzhevsky.

Shchusev's final major work was the Komsomolskaya–Koltsevaya metro station, which was conceived by Shchusev in 1945, fully designed by Alisa Zabolotnaya and Viktor Kokorin in 1949, and built in 1949–1951. The base structure, using then novel all-steel construction, provided for an exceptionally spacious interior. The main Baroque motif echoes the ornamentation of the Kazansky terminal, which was in turn based on the 17th century church of the Hodegetria in Rostov. The design earned Shchusev his fourth Stalin Prize, awarded posthumously in 1952. Later, foreign and Soviet authors alike criticized the "floridly overdone" design for its excessive and obtrusive historicism, which, according to Ikonnikov, was inappropriate for a busy transport hub.

In May 1949, Shchusev suffered a heart attack during a brief business trip to Kiev. He decided to return to Moscow, and a few days later died in a hospital.

=== Official accolades and subsequent reassessment ===
In the last decade of his life, Shchusev designed and built very few memorable buildings. However, in the same period he amassed an exceptional number of state awards, including four Stalin Prizes: for the IMEL building (1940), the expansion of the Lenin Mausoleum (1946), the Navoi Theater in Tashkent (1948), and the Komsomolskaya-Koltsevaya station (1952, posthumously). According to Chmelnizki, these awards were not indicative of Shchusev's own achievements. Rather, they reflected the influence of Shchusev's ultimate employers – the NKVD in 1938–1946 and the MGB in 1946–1948. The minions of these, the most influential entities of Stalin's regime, quite naturally reaped the most Stalin Prizes in technology and architecture. The awards did not make Shchusev invulnerable to unpredictable twists of Stalinist politics. In 1948, when a new smear campaign was directed at Karo Alabyan, Boris Iofan, and Ivan Zholtovsky, Shchusev was not targeted directly; but he nevertheless temporarily lost his control over the Akademproekt. He had to appeal directly to Stalin to have it restored.

Posthumously, the state awarded Shchusev unprecedented honours. A brief propaganda campaign declared him the most valuable and talented of all Soviet architects, elevating him to the same level that Vladimir Mayakovsky held in poetry. His religious and modernist heritage was forgotten; instead, the critics emphasized Shchusev's active aversion to "cosmopolitanism" and his contribution to the creation of "socialist realism in architecture". Despite all accolades, Shchusev ultimately failed to adapt to the rules of totalitarian architecture. Although he publicly declared that "The State wants splendor!" (Russian: Государство требует пышности!), he still valued functionality and freedom of composition above exterior decorations. He disposed with his trademark asymmetry but never mastered the new visual code of "superhuman monumentality". Very soon, he lost out to the younger generation of architects, who willfully and sincerely embraced totalitarianism. According to Chmelnizky, Shchusev performed in Stalinist architecture as brilliantly as he did in Art Nouveau and Constructivism; but this time the superlatives had nothing to do with art. Rather, they marked "the highest degree of compliance with the requirements of censorship", including Shchusev occasionally acting as a censor himself.

== Public activities and controversies ==
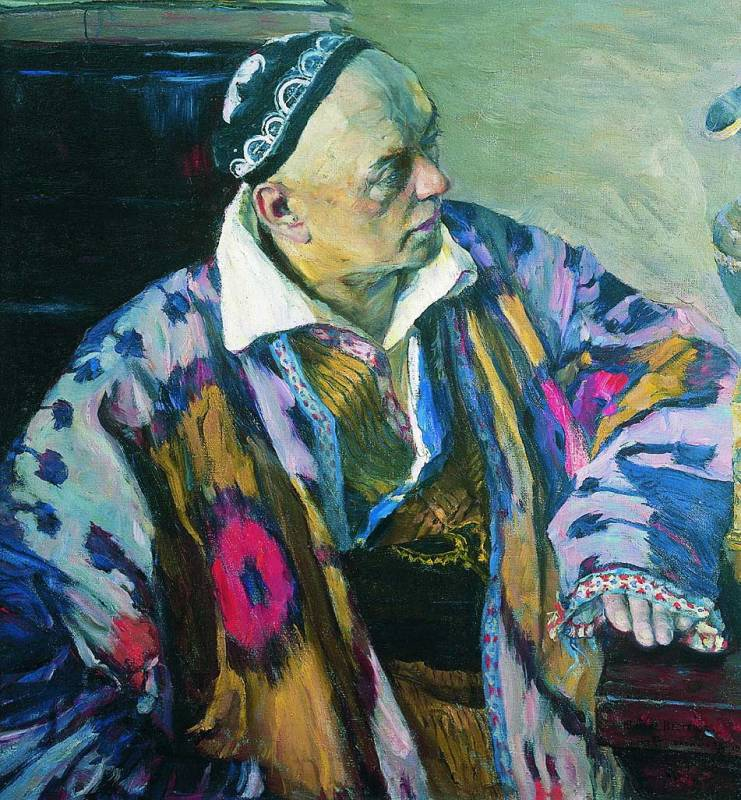
Portrait of Shchusev by Mikhail Nesterov, created in June–July 1941, shortly after the German invasion. Shchusev is wearing oriental garments that he had brought from Samarkand in the 1890s

=== Work style and ethics ===
In the early 1900s, Shchusev rapidly progressed from the role of an individual contractor to that of a charismatic leader of a large professional firm. A skilled draftsman in ink and watercolors, he created his own recognizable drawings himself until around 1914. While working on the Kazansky terminal, he reduced his involvement to quick sketches, which were then distributed to his assistants for proper drawing. Almost all ink drawings and watercolours published by Shchusev in the 1920s–1940s under his own name were created by others. Shchusev valued fine draftsmanship; a few well executed watercolors could guarantee an applicant a place in Shchusev's firm. This was, for instance, the case with Mikhail Posokhin, who was hired in 1935 and by 1946 had become the leader of his own design institute. However, most of Shchusev's staff stayed with the firm for decades. Some long-term associates, particularly Eugene Lanceray and Isidor Frantsuz, are well known to art collectors, and their works are usually easily identifiable. Others worked exclusively for the firm and remained unknown; their authorship cannot be reliably ascertained.

The back-and-forth, iterative cycle of sketching and drafting allowed Shchusev to explore many alternatives simultaneously, and to keep on improving the design during construction. His completed buildings invariably deviate from the originally approved draft. Shchusev considered himself a builder, rather than a designer, and never hesitated to change the design, whether from his own or the client's desires. He was equally at home dealing with Orthodox bishops, railway executives, and Bolshevik leaders. An often quoted shchusevism asserts that "If I could negotiate with the priests, I would somehow do it with the Bolsheviks" (Russian: Если я умел договариваться с попами, то с большевиками я как-нибудь договорюсь). The Bolsheviks, in return, appreciated Shchusev's willingness to adapt. Lazar Kaganovich privately wrote that Shchusev, "a businesslike and pragmatic eclecticist", was more valuable to the regime than the earnest, stubborn neoclassicist Ivan Zholtovsky.

The charges of plagiarism and running a "creative sweatshop" that were raised in 1937 were, for the most part, justified. Shchusev's workplace ethics were not much different from those of other Soviet architectural bosses, but his treatment of assistants was particularly controversial. Nikifor Tamonkin (1881–1951), one of his closest associates for almost forty years, and a competent architect in his own right, (Note: During his tenure with Shchusev, Tamonkin was officially credited as the lead architect of at least two Academy of Sciences buildings in Moscow.) described Shchusev as an unforgiving, disrespectful, ruthless exploiter of "lesser people". (Note: Vaskin quotes lengthy passages from Tamonkin's memoirs, written after Shchusev's death in 1950. The uncensored manuscript had never been intended for print. After Shchusev's death it was deposited at the Shchusev Museum of Architecture and is currently available to researchers.) "He had zero tolerance to his assistants, especially to me. Due to my peasant roots and sketchy education, he looked at me like an American or an Englishman looks at а "defective" native. This was the most conspicuous and substantial side of his personality." According to Tamonkin, Shchusev treated his wife, children, and his junior brother Pavel just as harshly: in his bipolar world of "important" and "unimportant" people, the family belonged to the second class.

=== Political advocacy ===
At the same time, Shchusev often acted as the advocate for the "lesser people" wrongfully persecuted by the communist regime. He was quite effective in this role, owing to his business skill and his first-hand knowledge of the communist leaders, the NKVD chiefs in particular. The NKVD was undeaf to voices of the professional elite, and often heeded their pleas—even moreso when the advocate was the architect of the Lenin Mausoleum. Prior to 1937, Shchusev never hesitated to use the mausoleum as his trump card; although, after 1937, according to Vaskin, that argument lost its former effectiveness.

The record of Shchusev's advocacy begins with the arrest of Nesterov in 1924; a few days later, Nesterov was released and the charges against him dropped. In 1925, Shchusev appealed for the release of muralist Vladimir Komarovsky. When the initial appeal failed, Shchusev arranged a joint petition with fellow artists. In the same year, Shchusev defended painter Vladimir Golitsyn and art historian Yury Olsufyev. All three were scions of princely families, and thus easy targets of the Red Terror. However, Komarovsky and Olsufyev were killed in December 1937 and March 1938, respectively, when Shchusev himself was expecting arrest; Golitsyn perished during World War II. Likewise, Shchusev failed to help Nesterov's son-in-law Victor Schroeter but eventually secured the release of Nesterov's daughter Olga. In 1943, Shchusev, Igor Grabar, Boris Asafyev, and Victor Vesnin jointly appealed to Beria for the release of painter Pyotr Neradovsky and managed to extricate him from exile. In 1948, Shchusev and Grabar arranged the release of art historian Nikolai Sychov.

=== Urban planning and preservation ===
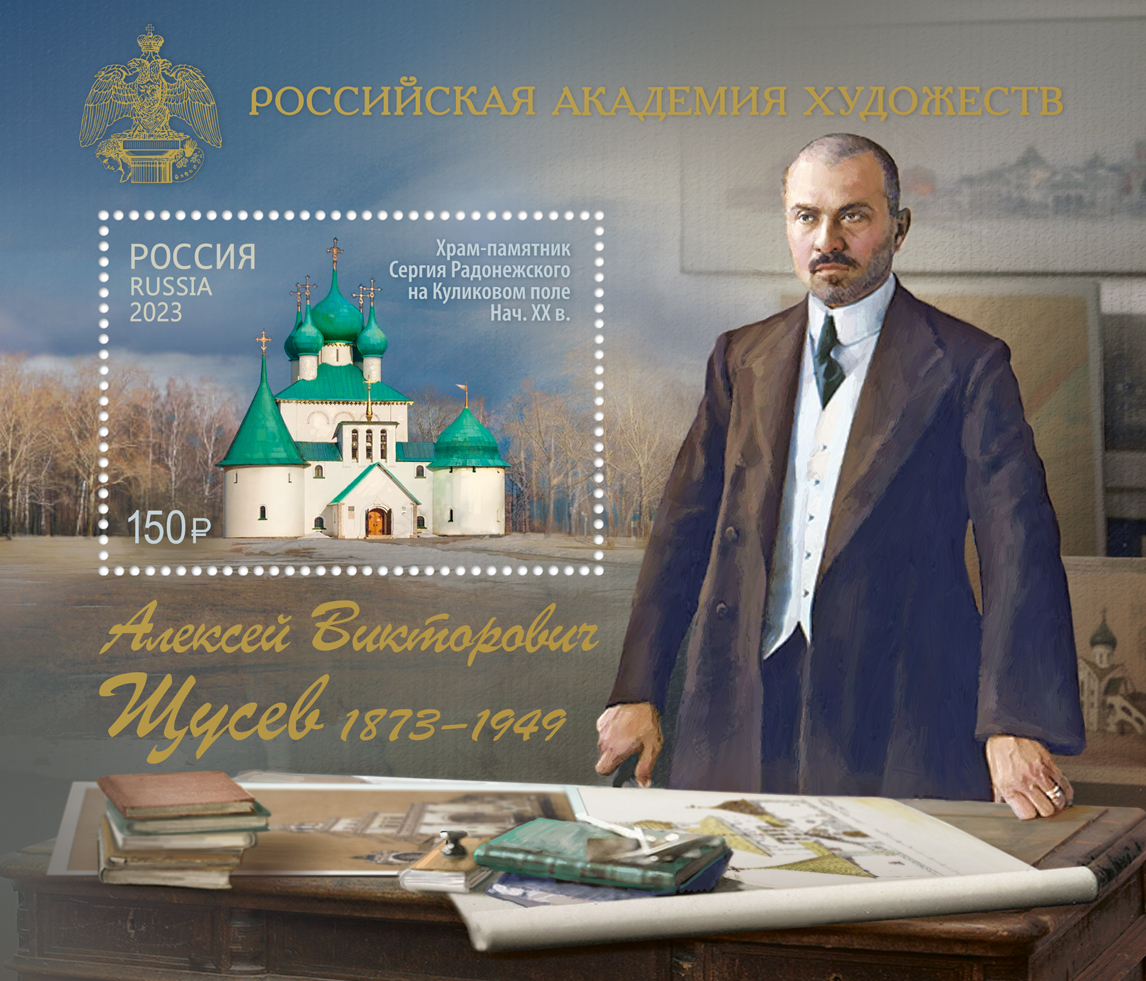
Shchusev and the Temple of Sergius of Radonezh on the Kulikovo Field on a 2023 stamp sheet of Russia

Shchusev's conservative views on city planning and redevelopment were influenced by his experiences in Ukraine, Bessarabia, and Italy, where he had learnt the art of adaptation to historical environments. His approach to reconciling past and present was similar to that of the younger generation of Italian urbanists, particularly Marcello Piacentini. The two architects had known each other since the 1911 Rome Exhibition and developed a keen interest in each other's works; Piacentini would refer to Shchusev's architecture until the 1950s.

In 1918, Shchusev and Ivan Zholtovsky assumed control of the New Moscow redevelopment plan sponsored by the communist city council. The planning team emerged as an extension of Zholtovsky's workshop; but by 1922 Shchusev, as the chairman of the Moscow Architectural Society, became the sole leader of the project. Although his staff was composed of modernist architects, from the Vesnin brothers to the Vkhutemas freshmen, the result was thoroughly conservative, with large territorial expansion into moderately dense suburbs and little intrusion into the old city. Shchusev proposed relocating the national administrative center northwest, to the Khodynka Field, thus relieving the city core from the rapidly increasing congestion. Most of the city within the Garden Ring would remain intact, with carefully placed "rays" of boulevards and parks extending from the Kremlin to the suburbs. Shchusev consistently rejected large-scale, all-or-nothing redevelopment ideas, and preferred continuing to build off of the existing city. He often clashed with the city authorities, arguing against the demolition of historic buildings. By the end of 1925, his preservationist stance had come into disfavour with the government, which replaced him with the far more amenable Sergey Shestakov. Shchusev's master plan was duly approved and then retired to the archives.

When they did not threaten historic buildings, Shchusev used the latest ideas of European and American planners. He liked the idea of standalone high-rise buildings, as advocated by Le Corbusier and Walter Gropius, but considered them too expensive for the Soviet economy and too hazardous for the existing level of technology. Although in 1924 he declared himself anti-Americanist, by 1929 he had changed his mind. This is evident from his patronage of the Russian edition of Richard Neutra's Wie Baut Amerika? (How Does America Build?). Shchusev still deplored the fact that the Americans were replacing art with engineering, and warned against blind imitation of their business practices. At the same time, he commended American technology and zoning as the instruments of mitigating the adverse effects of high-rise construction. His views were evolving, until the 1934 publication of the Architectural organization of the city. By this time political pressure had put an end to independent theorizing.

=== Museum management ===
The 1920s were not as productive for Shchusev as they were for Konstantin Melnikov or the Vesnin brothers. Frequent but fruitless competitions that led to infrequent tangible jobs left Shchusev enough free time to, in 1926, accept an offer to manage the nationalized Tretyakov Gallery. During his short tenure at the gallery, he installed electrical wiring and new heating and ventilation in the old main building, which he extended to the north. The "Shchusev wing", completed in 1936, became his last project in the Russian Revival style. Shchusev enjoyed working full-time as a museum curator, arranging exhibitions, enforcing catalog procedures, and printing postcards. However, the Commissar for Education Anatoly Lunacharsky had different plans, and at the beginning of 1929 replaced Shchusev with Mikhail Christy, a purely political appointee.

In the summer of 1945, Shchusev began campaigning for the establishment of a museum of Russian national architecture. He personally picked the former Talyzin House, then occupied by the NKVD, and used his connections within that organization to free it for the museum. Under Shchusev's management the museum became a refuge for Jews unemployed due to the anti-cosmopolitan campaign, such as David Arkin, Abram Efros, and Alexander Gabrichevsky. (Note: This was an indirect consequence of state payroll policies. The officially-set museum salaries were so meagre that they could only attract social outcasts.) The Baldin Collection of German art was secretly deposited in the museum, with Shchusev's consent, in 1948. However, the main purpose of the museum, as envisaged by Shchusev himself, was the recording and archiving of Russian heritage that had been destroyed or damaged during the war.
