= Rozhdestvensky =

Rozhdestvensky (masculine), Rozhdestvenskaya (feminine), or Rozhdestvenskoye (neuter) may refer to:

- Rozhdestvensky (surname) (Rozhdestvenskaya), Russian last name
- Rozhdestvenskiy (crater), a crater on the Moon
- Rozhdestvensky (rural locality) (Rozhdestvenskaya, Rozhdestvenskoye), several rural localities in Russia
- Nativity Convent (Moscow) (Rozhdestvensky Monastery), a female monastery in Moscow, Russia
- Rozhdestvensky Boulevard, a boulevard in Moscow, Russia
