= Chistye Prudy =

Chistye Prudy or Chistyye Prudy may refer to:

- Clean Ponds, a pond in Moscow, Russia
  - Chistyye Prudy (Moscow Metro), a station on the Sokolnicheskaya Line
  - Chistoprudny Boulevard in Moscow
- Chistye Prudy, Kaliningrad Oblast, a rural locality (settlement) in Kaliningrad Oblast, Russia
- Chistye Prudy, Bashkortostan, a rural locality in Bashkortostan, Russia
- "Chistye Prudy" (song), a song composed by David Tukhmanov and performed by Igor Talkov
- Clean Ponds (film), a 1965 Soviet drama film
