= Rozhdestvensky (rural locality) =

Rozhdestvensky (Russian: Рождественский; masculine), Rozhdestvenskaya (Рождественская; feminine), or Rozhdestvenskoye (Рождественское; neuter) is the name of several rural localities in Russia.

== Modern localities ==
- Rozhdestvensky, Republic of Bashkortostan, a village in Kirillovsky Selsoviet of Ufimsky District in the Republic of Bashkortostan
- Rozhdestvensky, Karasuksky District, Novosibirsk Oblast, a settlement in Karasuksky District of Novosibirsk Oblast; 54°6′N 78°36′E
- Rozhdestvensky, Kochkovsky District, Novosibirsk Oblast, a settlement in Kochkovsky District of Novosibirsk Oblast; 54°1′N 79°59′E
- Rozhdestvensky, Oryol Oblast, a settlement in Pennovsky Selsoviet of Trosnyansky District in Oryol Oblast; 52°24′N 35°40′E
- Rozhdestvensky, Rostov Oblast, a khutor in Anastasiyevskoye Rural Settlement of Matveyevo-Kurgansky District in Rostov Oblast; 47°34′N 38°27′E
- Rozhdestvensky, Saratov Oblast, a settlement in Yekaterinovsky District of Saratov Oblast
- Rozhdestvensky, Republic of Tatarstan, a settlement in Nurlatsky District of the Republic of Tatarstan
- Rozhdestvensky, Tula Oblast, a settlement in Rozhdestvensky Rural Okrug of Leninsky District in Tula Oblast
- Rozhdestvensky, Voronezh Oblast, a khutor in Markovskoye Rural Settlement of Kamensky District in Voronezh Oblast
- Rozhdestvenskoye, Republic of Bashkortostan (or Rozhdestvensky), a village in Ilyino-Polyansky Selsoviet of Blagoveshchensky District in the Republic of Bashkortostan; 55°1′N 56°9′E
- Rozhdestvenskoye, Bogorodsky District, Kirov Oblast, a selo in Oshlansky Rural Okrug of Bogorodsky District in Kirov Oblast; 57°53′N 50°29′E
- Rozhdestvenskoye, Urzhumsky District, Kirov Oblast, a selo in Bogdanovsky Rural Okrug of Urzhumsky District in Kirov Oblast; 57°16′N 49°58′E
- Rozhdestvenskoye, Yaransky District, Kirov Oblast, a selo in Opytnopolsky Rural Okrug of Yaransky District in Kirov Oblast; 57°24′N 47°52′E
- Rozhdestvenskoye, Kostroma Oblast, a selo in Ivanovskoye Settlement of Sharyinsky District in Kostroma Oblast; 58°9′N 45°37′E
- Rozhdestvenskoye, Krasnoyarsk Krai, a selo in Rozhdestvensky Selsoviet of Kazachinsky District in Krasnoyarsk Krai
- Rozhdestvenskoye, Medvensky District, Kursk Oblast, a selo in Chermoshnyansky Selsoviet of Medvensky District in Kursk Oblast
- Rozhdestvenskoye, Shchigrovsky District, Kursk Oblast, a selo in Nikolsky Selsoviet of Shchigrovsky District in Kursk Oblast
- Rozhdestvenskoye, Nizhny Novgorod Oblast, a village in Malozinovyevsky Selsoviet under the administrative jurisdiction of the city of oblast significance of Semyonov in Nizhny Novgorod Oblast; 56°50′N 44°21′E
- Rozhdestvenskoye, Dolzhansky District, Oryol Oblast, a selo in Dubrovsky Selsoviet of Dolzhansky District in Oryol Oblast; 52°8′N 37°20′E
- Rozhdestvenskoye, Kolpnyansky District, Oryol Oblast, a selo in Ushakovsky Selsoviet of Kolpnyansky District in Oryol Oblast; 52°21′N 37°19′E
- Rozhdestvenskoye, Trosnyansky District, Oryol Oblast, a selo in Pennovsky Selsoviet of Trosnyansky District in Oryol Oblast; 52°23′N 35°40′E
- Rozhdestvenskoye, Perm Krai, a selo in Permsky District of Perm Krai
- Rozhdestvenskoye, Ryazan Oblast, a selo in Borovkovsky Rural Okrug of Alexandro-Nevsky District in Ryazan Oblast
- Rozhdestvenskoye, Tambov Oblast, a selo in Rozhdestvensky Selsoviet of Rasskazovsky District in Tambov Oblast
- Rozhdestvenskoye, Voronezh Oblast, a selo in Rozhdestvenskoye Rural Settlement of Povorinsky District in Voronezh Oblast
- Rozhdestvenskaya, Stavropol Krai, a stanitsa in Rozhdestvensky Selsoviet of Izobilnensky District in Stavropol Krai

== Alternative names ==
- Rozhdestvensky, alternative name of Novaya Ulitsa, a settlement in Novoyamsky Rural Administrative Okrug of Sevsky District in Bryansk Oblast; 52°11′N 34°31′E
- Rozhdestvenskoye, alternative name of Krasnoye, a selo in Mikheyevsky Rural Okrug of Lebyazhsky District in Kirov Oblast; 57°28′N 49°29′E
- Rozhdestvenskoye, alternative name of Rozhdestveno, a village in Gabovskoye Rural Settlement of Dmitrovsky District in Moscow Oblast; 56°8′N 37°17′E
- Rozhdestvenskaya, alternative name of Rozhdestveno, a village under the administrative jurisdiction of the Town of Vereya in Naro-Fominsky District of Moscow Oblast; 55°23′N 36°11′E
- Rozhdestvenskoye, alternative name of Rozhdestvo, a village in Ateptsevskoye Rural Settlement of Naro-Fominsky District in Moscow Oblast; 55°18′N 36°41′E
- Rozhdestvensky, alternative name of Rozhdestvenka, a settlement in Chanovsky District of Novosibirsk Oblast; 55°22′N 77°29′E
- Rozhdestvensky, alternative name of Rozhdestvenka, a selo in Kupinsky District of Novosibirsk Oblast; 54°17′N 77°34′E
- Rozhdestvenskoye, alternative name of Rozhdestvenka, a selo in Suzunsky District of Novosibirsk Oblast; 54°22′N 82°27′E
- Rozhdestvensky, alternative name of Rozhdestvenka, a village in Tatarsky District of Novosibirsk Oblast; municipally, a part of Uvalsky Rural Settlement of that district; 55°25′N 75°15′E
- Rozhdestvensky, alternative name of Rozhdestvenka, a village in Lyubimovsky Rural Okrug of Okoneshnikovsky District in Omsk Oblast; 54°37′N 75°1′E
