= Rasul Gamzatov =

Avar poet (1923–2003)

- Расул Гамзатов; ХӀамзатазул Расул
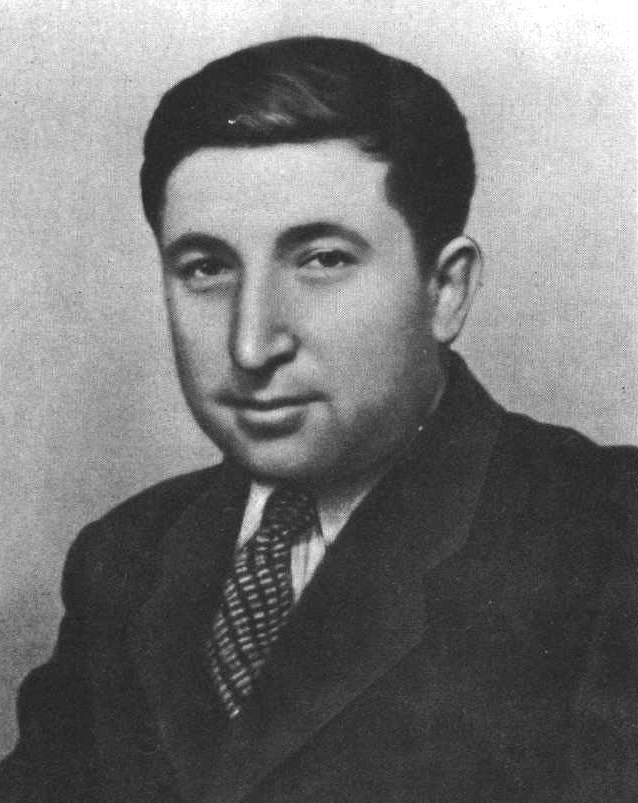
- Gamzatov, c. 1952
- Born: 8 September 1923; Cada, Khunzakhsky District, Dagestan ASSR, Russian SFSR, Soviet Union
- Died: 3 November 2003 (aged 80); Moscow, Russia
- Occupation: Poet
- Title: Hero of Socialist Labour (1974)
- Awards: Order of St. Andrew (Russia); Order "For Merit to the Fatherland" (Russia,3rd class); Order of Lenin (USSR,×4); Order of the October Revolution (USSR); Order of the Red Banner of Labour (USSR,×3); Order of Friendship of Peoples (USSR); Order of the Golden Fleece (Georgia); Lenin Prize (1963); USSR State Prize (1952)

Rasul Gamzatovich Gamzatov (Avar: ХӀамзатазул Расул ХӀамзатил вас, romanized: Ħamzatazul Rasul Ħamzatil vas, IPA: [ħamzatil rasul]; Russian: Расу́л Гамза́тович Гамза́тов, IPA: [rɐˈsul ɡɐmˈzatəvʲɪtɕ ɡɐmˈzatəf]; 8 September 1923 – 3 November 2003) was a Soviet and Russian poet who wrote in Avar. Among his poems was Zhuravli, which became a well-known Soviet song.

== Life ==
Gamzatov was born on 8 September 1923 in the Avar village of Tsada in the north-east Caucasus. His father, Gamzat Tsadasa, was a well-known bard, heir to the ancient tradition of minstrelsy still thriving in the mountains. He was eleven when he wrote his first verse about a group of local boys who ran down to the clearing where an airplane had landed for the first time. A number of different poems by him also became songs, such as Gone Sunny Days.

In 1939 he graduated from Pedagogical College. He had various jobs serving as a school teacher, an assistant director in the theater, a journalist in newspapers and a radio host. From 1945 to 1950 he studied at the Maxim Gorky Literature Institute.

Gamzatov was awarded the State Stalin Prize in 1952, The Lenin Prize in 1963, and Laureate Of The International Botev Prize in 1981.

Gamzatov died on 3 November 2003 at the age of 80 in the Moscow Central Clinical Hospital. He was buried in the old Muslim cemetery in Tarki, next to the grave of his wife.

A monument to Gamzatov was unveiled on 5 July 2013 on Yauzsky Boulevard in central Moscow.

One of his poems, The Oath, has later become the anthem of Dagestan in 2016, translated into Russian by Nikolay Dorizo.

== Honours and awards ==
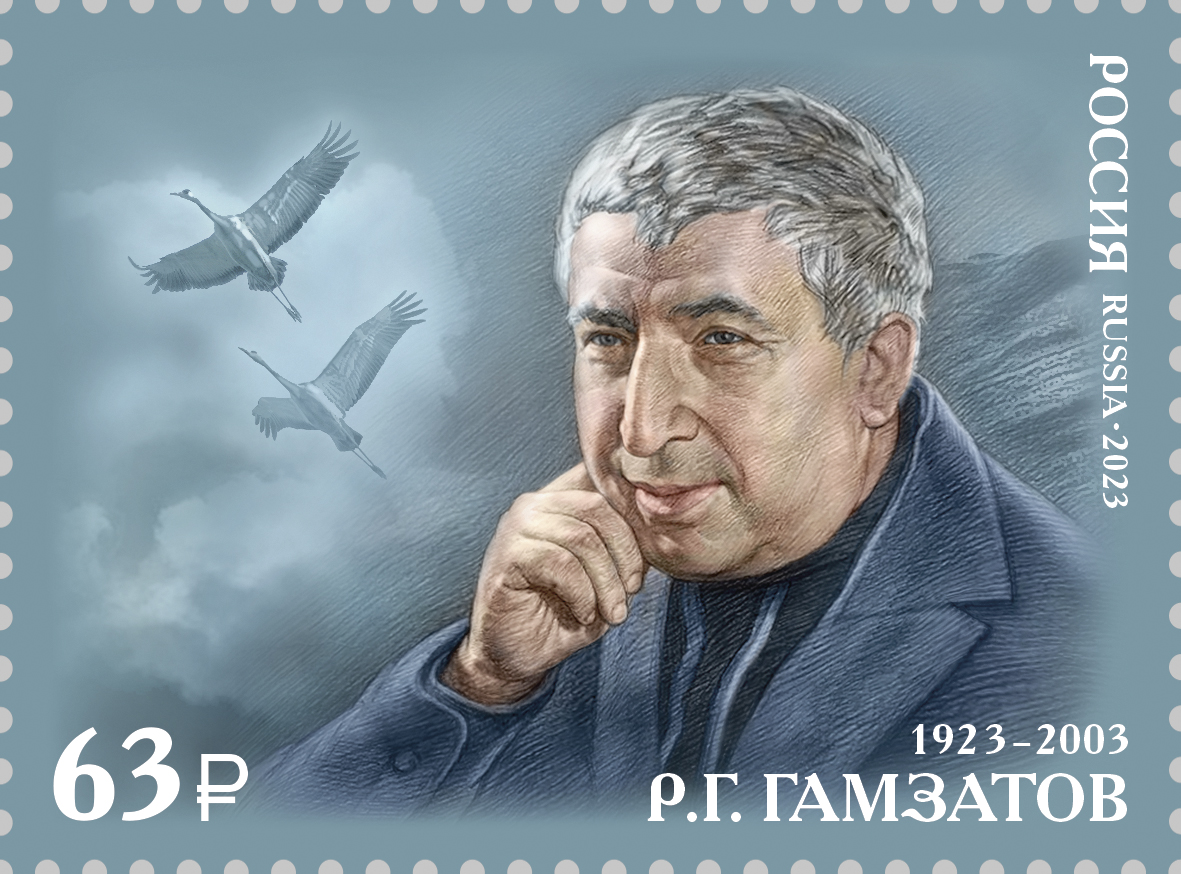
Gamzatov on a 2023 stamp of Russia

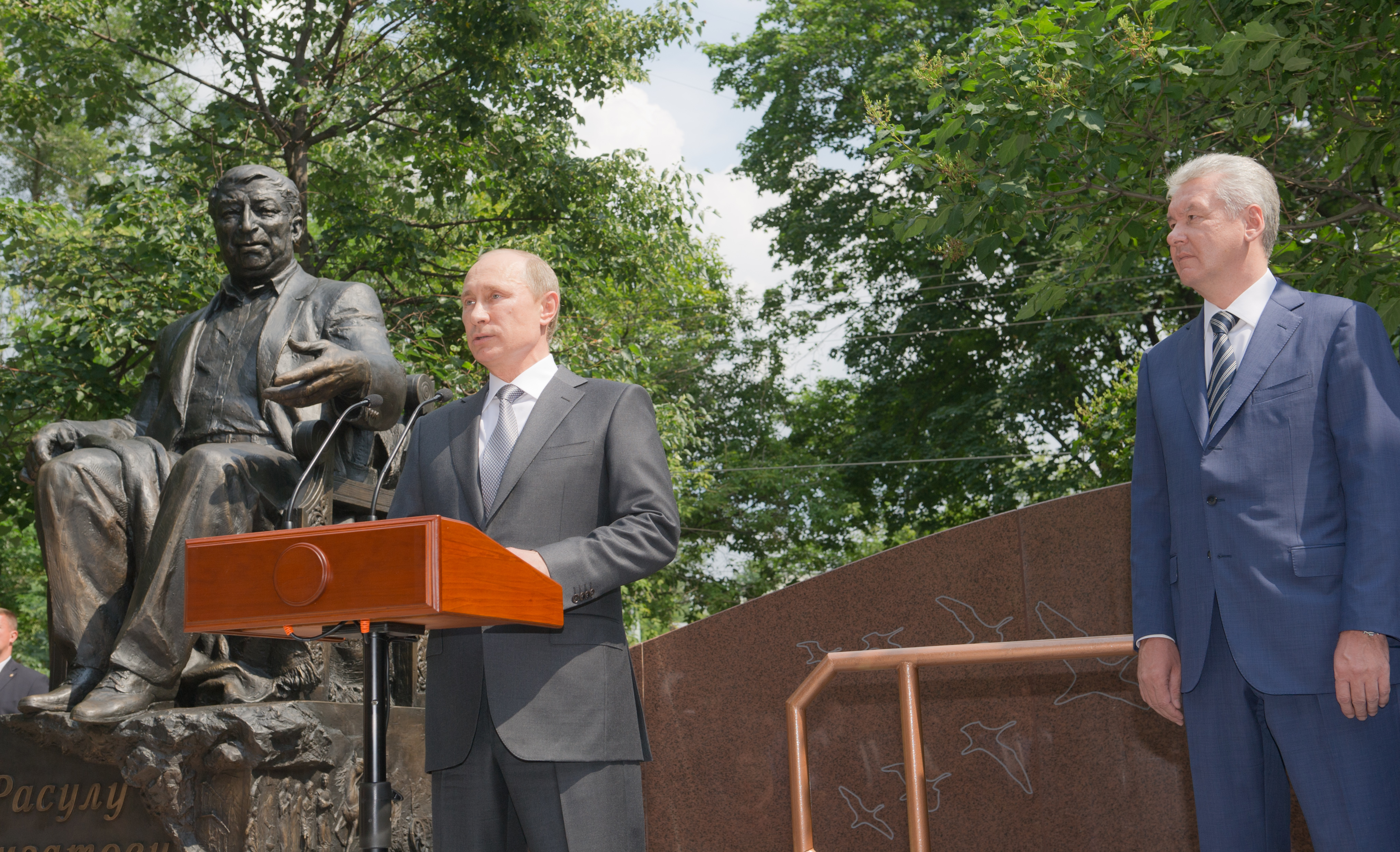
Vladimir Putin and Sergey Sobyanin at the opening ceremony of a monument to Gamzatov in Yauzsky Boulevard in Moscow

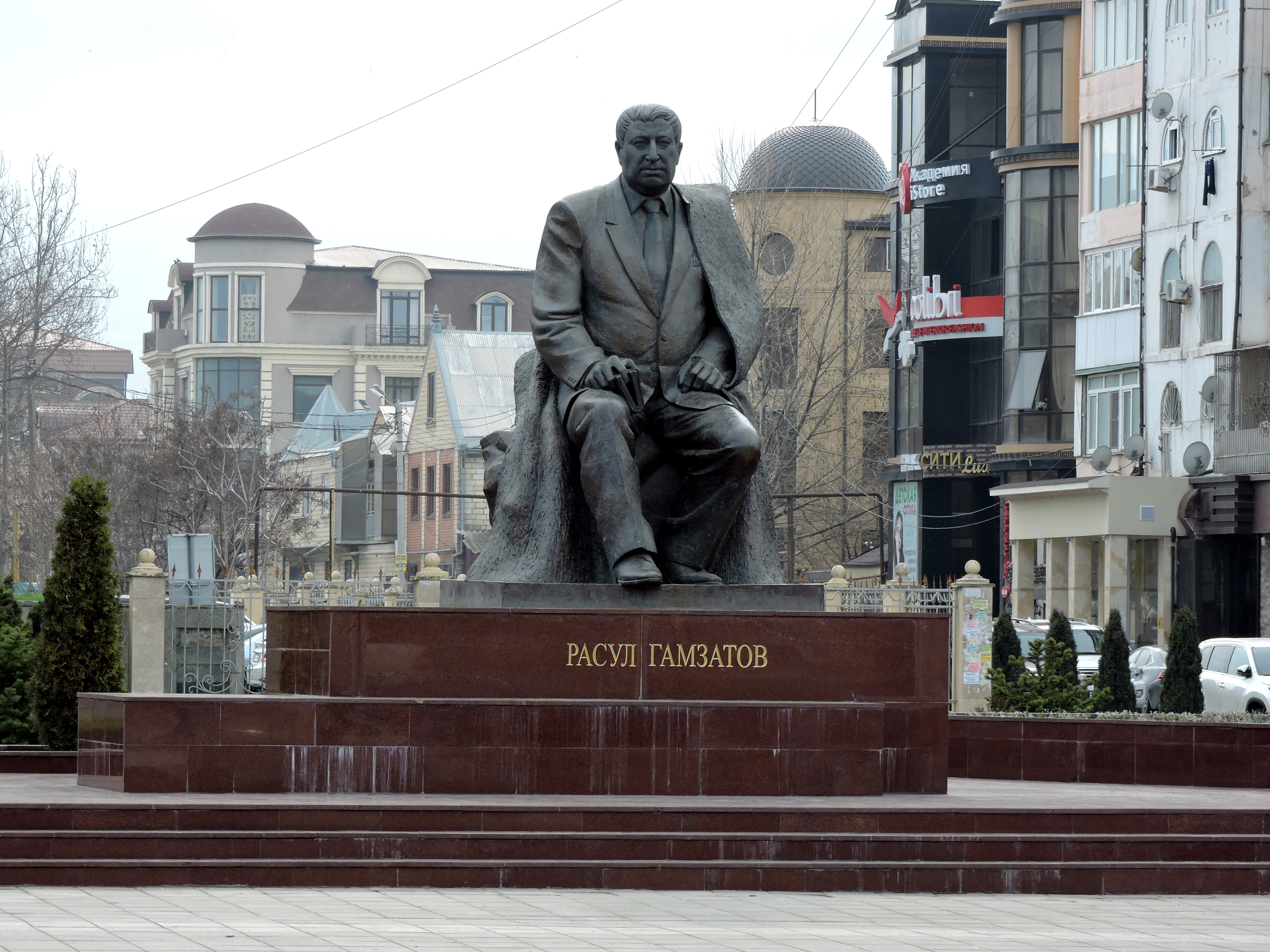
Monument to Gamzatov in Makhachkala

- Hero of Socialist Labour (27 September 1974)
- Order of St. Andrew (8 September 2003) – for outstanding contribution to the development of national literature and public activities
- Order of Merit for the Fatherland, 3rd class (18 April 1999) – for outstanding contribution to the multinational culture of Russia
- Order of the Friendship of Peoples (6 September 1993) – for outstanding contribution to the development of the multinational Soviet literature and productive social activities
- Four Orders of Lenin
- Order of the October Revolution
- Order of the Red Banner of Labour, four times
- Order of Peter the Great
- Order of Saints Cyril and Methodius (Bulgaria)
- Lenin Prize (1963) – for the book "High Star"
- Stalin Prize, third class (1952) – a collection of poems and the poems "The year of my birth"
- State Prize of the RSFSR, Gorky (1980) – for the poem "Take care of mothers'
- People's Poet of Daghestan
- International Award for "Best Poet of the 20th century"
- Writers Award in Asia and Africa "Lotus"
- Jawaharlal Nehru Award
- Ferdowsi Award
- Award of Hristo Botev
- International Prize Sholokhov in art and literature
- Award Fadeeva
- Award Batyr
- Award Mahmoud
- C. Award Stalskiy
- G. Award Tsadasy
- Order of the Golden Fleece (Georgia)
