= State Anthem of Dagestan =

Gosudarstvennyj gimn Respubliki Dagestan
English: State Anthem of the Republic of Dagestan
- Государственный гимн Республики Дагестан
- Coat of arms of Dagestan
- State anthem of Dagestan, Russia
- Also known as: «Гьа бай» «Кьин кьун» «Хъяличи» (English: 'The Oath')
- Lyrics: Rasul Gamzatov (Avar version), Nikolay Dorizo (Russian version); Merdali Zhalilov (Lezgian translation)
- Music: Murad Kazhlayev
- Adopted: 25 February 2016
- Preceded by: State Anthem of the Republic of Dagestan (2003–2016)

Audio sample
- Instrumental recording: file; help

The State Anthem of the Republic of Dagestan, (Note: Russian: Государственный гимн Республики Дагестан, Gosudarstvennyj gimn Respubliki Dagestan; Avar: Дагъистаналъул Жумгьурияталъул Пачалихъияб Гимн; Lezgian: Дагъустан Республикадин Пачагьлугъдин Гимн; Kumyk: Дагъыстан Республиканы Пачалыкъ Гимни; Muslim Tat: Гимн э Билеет э Республикей Догъисту; Rutul: Дагъыстан Республикадид Пачалыгъад Гимн; Azerbaijani: Дағыстан Республикасынын Дөвләт Һимни; Nogai: Дагыстан Республикасынынъ Патшалык Гимны; Chechen: Дегӏастанан Республикан Пачхьалкхан Гимн; Ghodoberi: Дагъистан Республикалӏи Пачалихъилӏи Гимн; Dargwa: Дагъистан Республикала Пачалихъла Гимн; Aghul: Дагъусттан Республикайин Паччагьдин Гимн; Tabassaran: Дагъустан Республикайин Паччагьлугъдин Гимн; Tsakhur: Дагъыстан Республикайни Паччагьни Гимн; Lak: Дагъусттаннал Республикалул Паччахӏлугърал Гимн) a constituent republic of Russia, was adopted on 25 February 2016. The music was composed by Murad Kazhlayev, and the lyrics are based on an Avar poem by Rasul Gamzatov. The official Russian lyrics were written by Nikolay Dorizo. It replaced the original anthem that functioned as the state anthem from 2003 to 2016.

== History ==
The State Anthem was first approved by the Law of the Republic of Dagestan "On the State Anthem of the Republic of Dagestan" dated 19 November 2003, under the title "Dagestan, You Holy Fatherland", with lyrics by poet Shirvani Chalayev.

In 2015, the Head of the Republic of Dagestan decided there be a replacement for "Dagestan, You Holy Fatherland", with new music and lyrics. A competition had been held on 20 June by Ramazan Abdulatipov, and different lyrical versions had been submitted. The current lyrics to "The Oath" (Russian: Клятва) – its simpler name – was officially approved

== Lyrics ==
Russian original

I
Горные реки к морю спешат.
Птицы к вершинам путь свой вершат
Ты – мой очаг, ты – моя колыбель,
Клятва моя – Дагестан.

Припев:
Тебе присягаю на верность свою,
Дышу я тобой, о тебе пою.
Созвездье народов нашло здесь семью,
Мой малый народ, мой великий народ.

II
Подвиги горцев, братство и честь,
Здесь это было, здесь это есть.
Мой Дагестан и Россия моя,
Вместе с тобой навсегда!

Припев

Дагестан!

Russian Latin alphabet

I
Gornyje reki k morju spešat.
Pticy k veršinam putj svoj veršat
Ty – moj očag, ty – moja kolybelj
Kljatva moja – Dagestan.

Pripev:
Tebe prisjagaju na vernostj svoju,
Dyšu ja toboj, o tebe poju.
Sozvezdje narodov našlo zdesj semiu
Moj malyj narod, moj velikij narod.

II
Podvigi gorcev, bratstvo i čestj.
Zdesj eto bylo, zdesj eto jestj.
Moj Dagestan i Rossija moja,
Vmeste s toboj navsegda!

Pripev

Dagestan!

English translation

I
Down the peaks creeks stream into the seas,
Away the birds fly into the heights.
You are my heart, you are my fountain,
You are my oath, Dagestan.

Chorus:
To you I swear my loyalty,
You're the air I breathe, you're the air I sing.
Constellation of families aplenty,
O my little nation, yet so imposing.

II
Feats of highlanders, kinship and honour,
There you were, and now here you are!
O my Dagestan and my Russia,
Together and forever!

Chorus

Dagestan!
