= Velikanov =

Velikanov (Russian: Великанов, from великан meaning giant) is a Russian masculine surname, its feminine counterpart is Velikanova. It may refer to

- Gelena Velikanova (1923–1998), Soviet pop singer
- Mikhail Velikanov (1892–1938), Soviet military commander
- Tatyana Velikanova (1932–2002), Russian mathematician
