= Embassy of Iran, Moscow =

Embassy of the Islamic Republic of Iran in Moscow سفارت جمهوری اسلامی ایران در مسکو Посольство Исламской Республики Иран в Москве
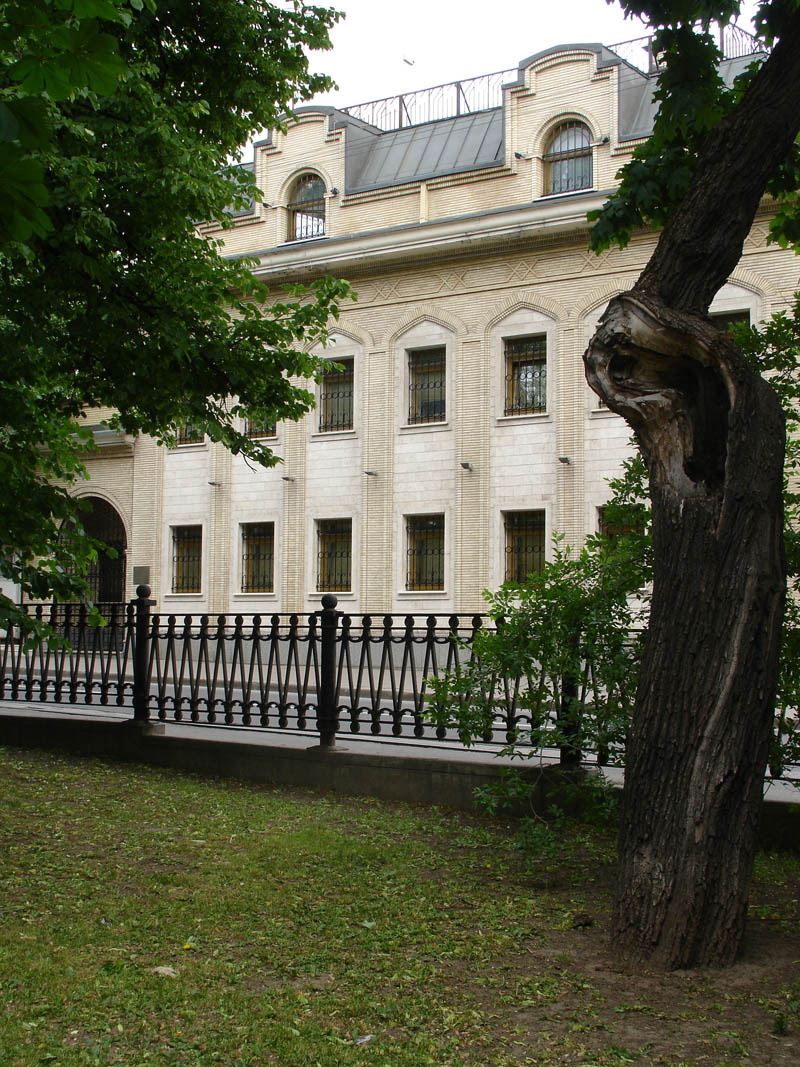
- Location: Moscow
- Address: 7 Pokrovsky Boulevard
- Coordinates: 55.7553°N 37.6489°E
- Ambassador: Kazem Jalali

The Embassy of Iran in Moscow (Persian: سفارت ایران در مسکو) is the diplomatic mission of the Islamic Republic of Iran to the Russian Federation. The chancery is located at 7 Pokrovsky Boulevard (Russian: Покровский бульвар, 7) in the Basmanny District of Moscow.

== See also ==
- Iran–Russia relations
- Diplomatic missions in Russia
