= Dagestan, You Holy Fatherland =

Former regional anthem of Dagestan, Russia (2003–2016)

Дагестан, ты отчизна святая
English: 'Dagestan, You Holy Fatherland'
- Coat of arms of Dagestan
- Former regional anthem of Dagestan, Russia
- Lyrics: Shirvani Chalayev
- Music: Shirvani Chalayev
- Adopted: 30 October 2003
- Relinquished: 25 February 2016
- Succeeded by: State Anthem of the Republic of Dagestan (2016–present)

"Dagestan, You Holy Fatherland" (Russian: Дагестан, ты отчизна святая) was the original regional anthem of the Russian federal subject of Dagestan from 2003 to 2016. It was composed and written by Shirvani Chalayev.

== History ==
It was adopted on 30 October 2003 and relinquished on 25 February 2016. A new Dagestani regional anthem was adopted on 25 February 2016. It is now the organizational anthem of the Russian Armed Forces and the Russian police in Dagestan.

== Lyrics ==
Russian original

I
Дагестан, ты отчизна святая!
Нет родней и свободнее края.
Горы твои мудры, степи твои щедры,
Древнего Каспия благодатны дары!

Припев:
Край наш вершинный, край наш орлиный!
Верой хранимый, славный Дагестан!
Воля твоя непоколебима: жить в семье единой
Вечный Дагестан!

II
Дагестан, перед силою вражьей
Не склонял головы ты отважной!
Сердце — скала, зоркость орла!
Кровь героев всегда в твоих жилах текла!

Припев

Наш Дагестан!

Russian Latin alphabet

I
Dagestan, ty otčizna svjataja!
Net rodnej i svobodneje kraja.
Gory tvoi mudry, stepi tvoi ščedry,
Drevnego Kaspija blagodatny dary!

Pripev:
Kraj naš veršinnyj, kraj naš orlinyj!
Veroj hranimyj, slavnyj Dagestan!
Volja tvoja nepokolebima: žitj v semje jedinoj
Večnyj Dagestan!

II
Dagestan, pered siloju vražjej
Ne sklonjal golovy ty otvažnoj!
Serdce — skala, zorkostj orla!
Krovj geronev vsegda v tvoih žilah tekla!

Pripev

Naš Dagestan!

English translation

I
O Dagestan, you fatherland holy,
There is no land more free and more dear.
Your mountains are safe, your steppes aplenty,
The gifts of ancient Caspian blessing bear.

Chorus:
O our land of peaks, O our land of eagles!
Shielded by faith, o glorious Dagestan!
Unwavering is your willpower: to live in one family
Eternal Dagestan!

II
O Dagestan, under enemy power,
You have never your brave head bowed.
Your heart a rock, you watch like an eagle,
The blood of our heroes always in your veins flowed.

Chorus

Our Dagestan!
