= Clean Ponds =

Pond in Moscow, Russia

Coordinates: 55°45′39″N 37°38′41″E

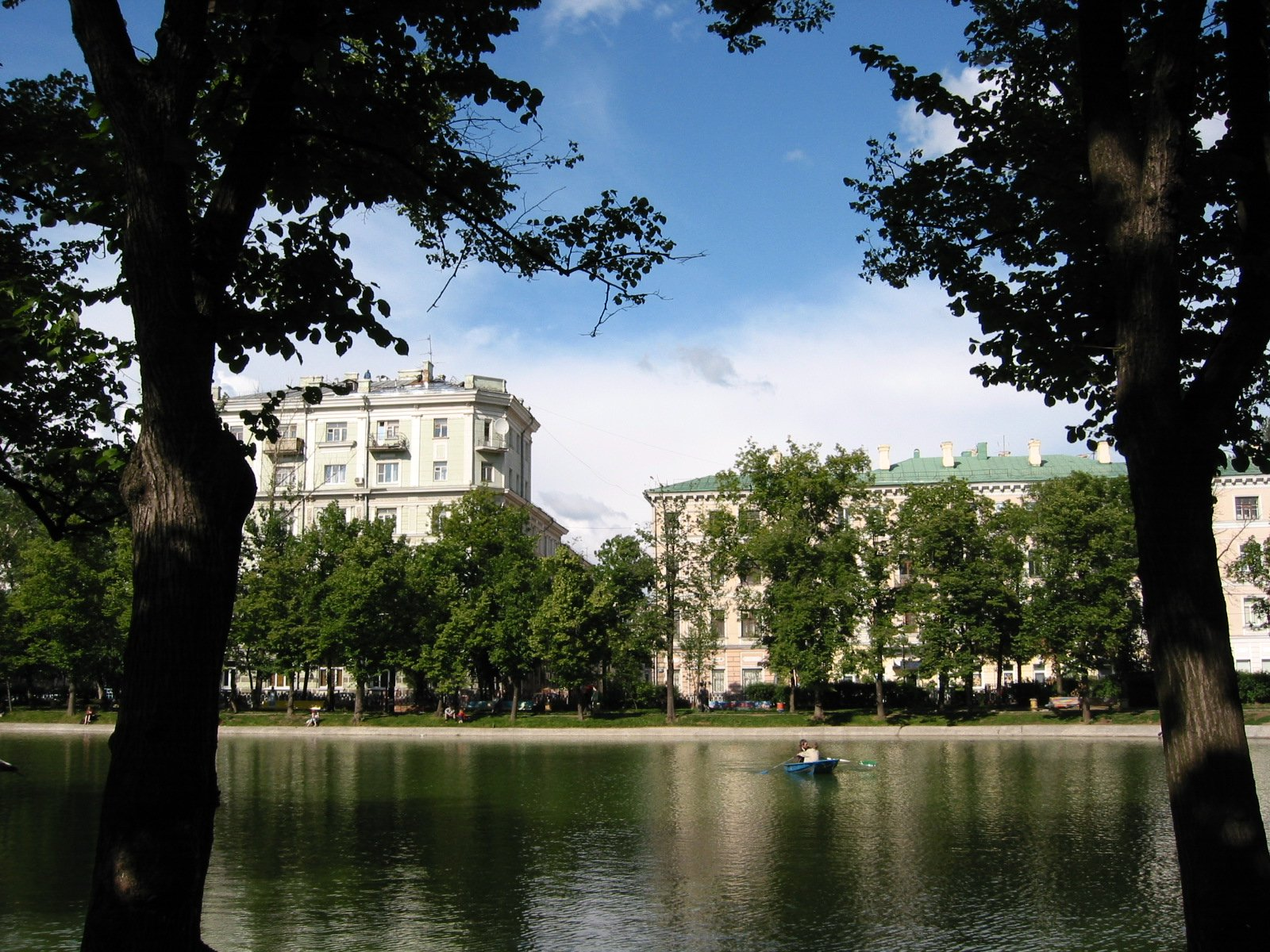
Clean Ponds

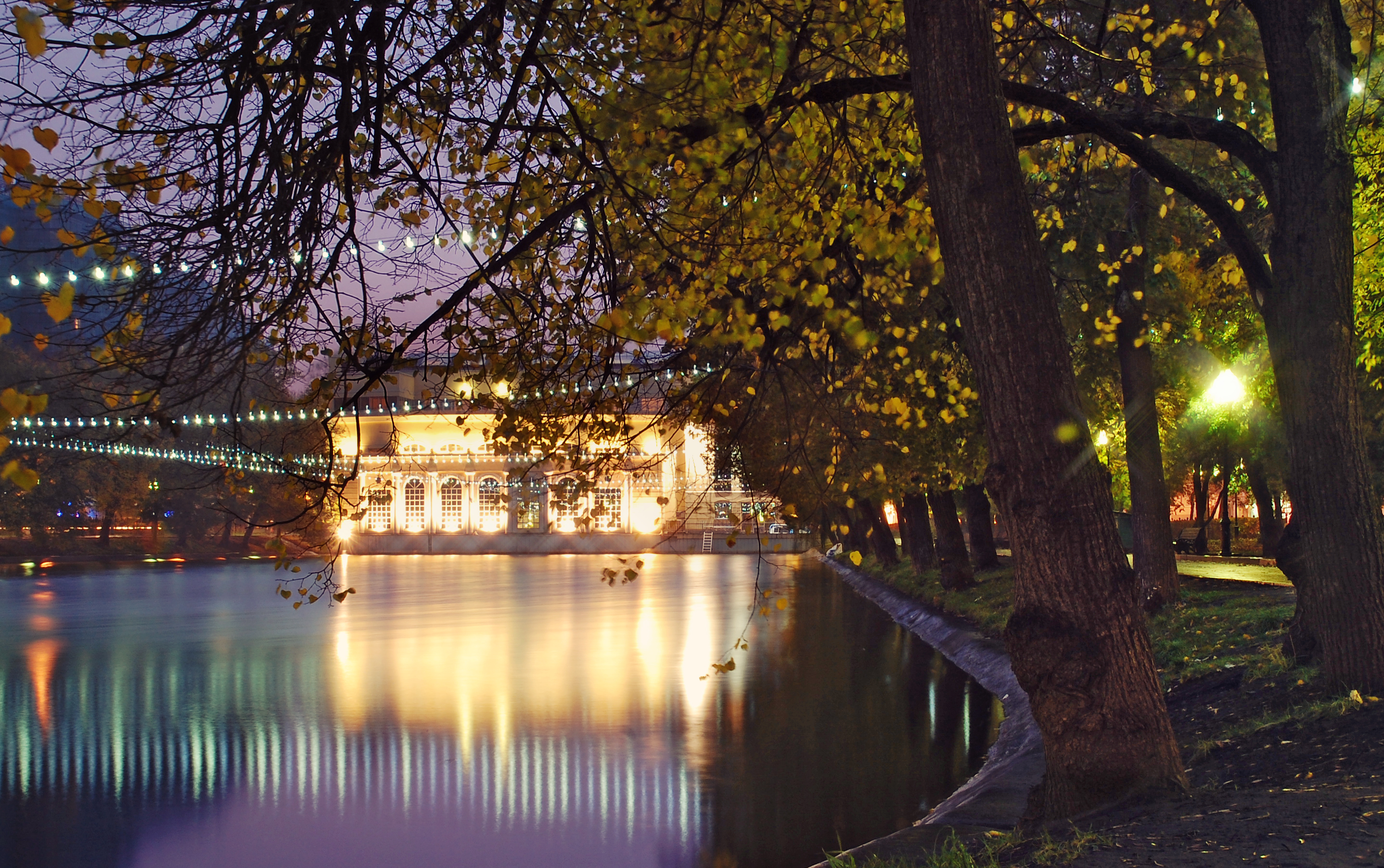
Clean Ponds at night

The Clean Ponds (Russian: Чистые пруды, romanized: Chistye prudy) is a large pond in Moscow, Russia, located in Basmanny District, on the Boulevard Ring. The pond gives its name to Chistoprudny Boulevard, which runs from Turgenevskaya Square and Sretensky Boulevard towards Pokrovka Street, where it adjoins Pokrovsky Boulevard, and to Chistyye Prudy station on the Moscow Metro. According to retired KGB colonel Victor Cherkashin, author of Spy Handler: Memoir of a KGB Officer: The True Story of the Man Who Recruited Robert Hanssen and Aldrich Ames, the adjoining 'Chistyi Prudy (Clean Ponds)' is also part of "an old, prestigious neighborhood." On page 177 of his book, Victor Cherkashin spells the area as 'Chistyi' as opposed to 'Chistye.'

The ponds were formed by a dam on the Rachka River which used to flow underneath the walls of the White City in the 17th century. Nowadays the river is underground, as are all the ponds but one. The Clean Ponds are fed by a system of water pipes.

During the 17th century, people threw garbage and waste in the river and the ponds, getting them their former name of Dirty Ponds. In 1703, the ponds were acquired by Prince Menshikov, who built the Menshikov Tower in the vicinity. He had the ponds cleaned of garbage and rechristened to their current name.

The ponds have since stayed clean. Nowadays the only pond remaining is home to some ducks. In the winter it is used as a skating rink.
