= Nativity Convent (Moscow) =

Monastery in Moscow, Russia

Coordinates: 55°45′57″N 37°37′27″E

Rozhdestvensky Convent, or the Convent of Nativity of Theotokos (Russian: Богородице-Рождественский монастырь, romanized: Bogoroditsye-Rozhdestvyenskiy monastyr'), is one of the oldest nunneries in Moscow, located inside the Boulevard Ring, on the left bank of the Neglinnaya River. Rozhdestvensky Boulevard and Rozhdestvenka Street owe their names to the convent.

The convent was founded in the Moscow Kremlin in 1386, probably by Maria of Rostov, mother of Prince Vladimir the Bold. Among the ladies of royal blood who took the veil in the convent were the daughter of the Lithuanian grand duke Algirdas, Helen and Vasily III's wife Solomonia Saburova. The convent was moved to its present location in 1484; the small katholikon was erected in the last years of Ivan III's reign. This is one of the oldest buildings in downtown Moscow, outside the Kremlin walls. The burial vault of the Lobanov-Rostovsky princely family dates from the 1670s.

The convent was abolished in 1922, but some of the nuns and lay sisters would continue living in their cells (two of them - Varvara and Viktorina - lived there until the late 1970s). Upon the closure of the convent, the most revered icons were relocated to the Church of St. Nicholas in Zvonari. When the latter was itself shut down, the icons were transferred to the church of Saint Sergius in Pushkari and later to the Epiphany church in Pereyaslavskaya Sloboda. The divine service in Rozhdestvensky Convent was resumed in 1992.
