= Chistoprudny Boulevard =

Thoroughfare in Moscow, Russia

Coordinates: 55°45′18″N 37°38′54″E

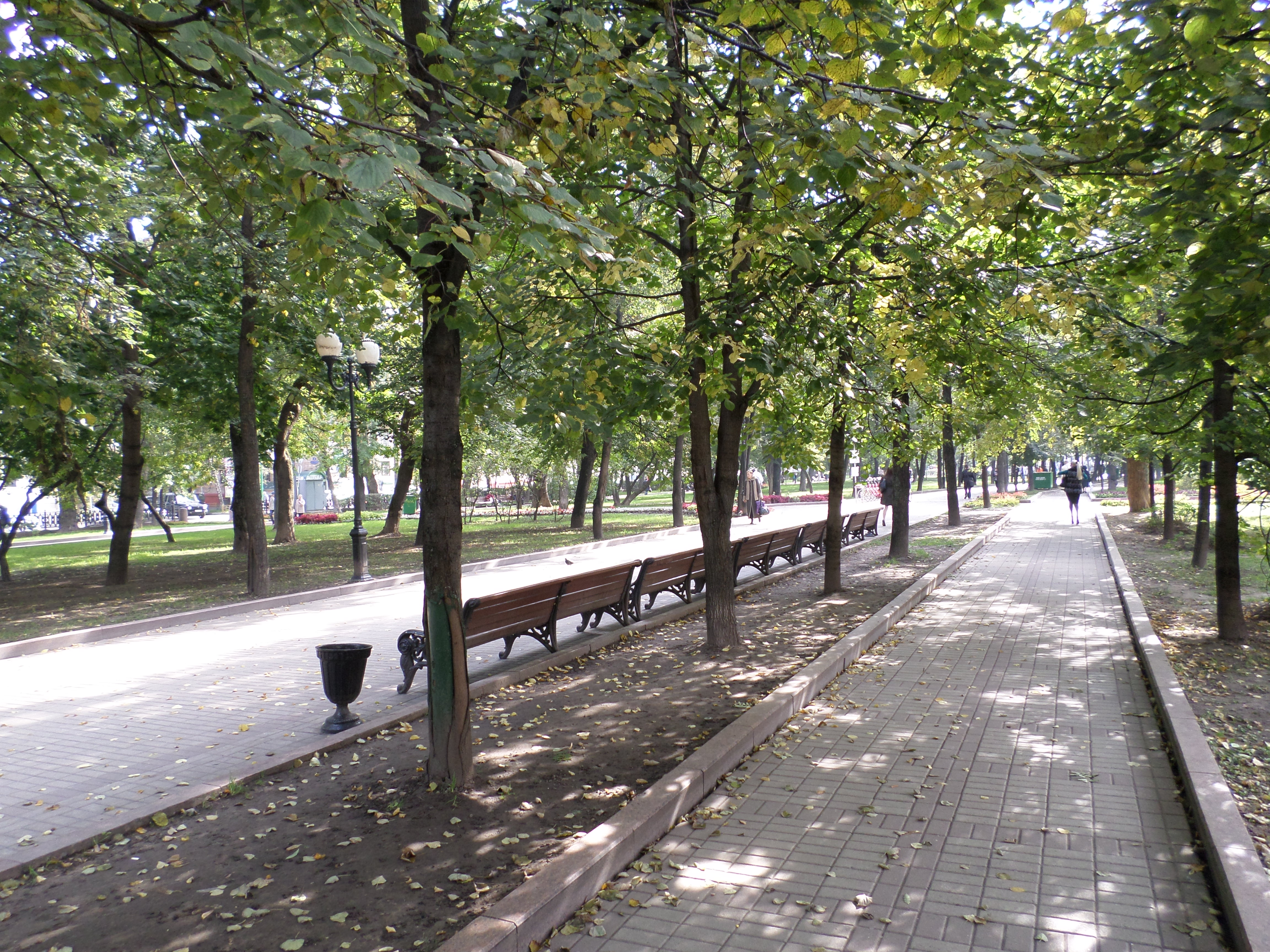

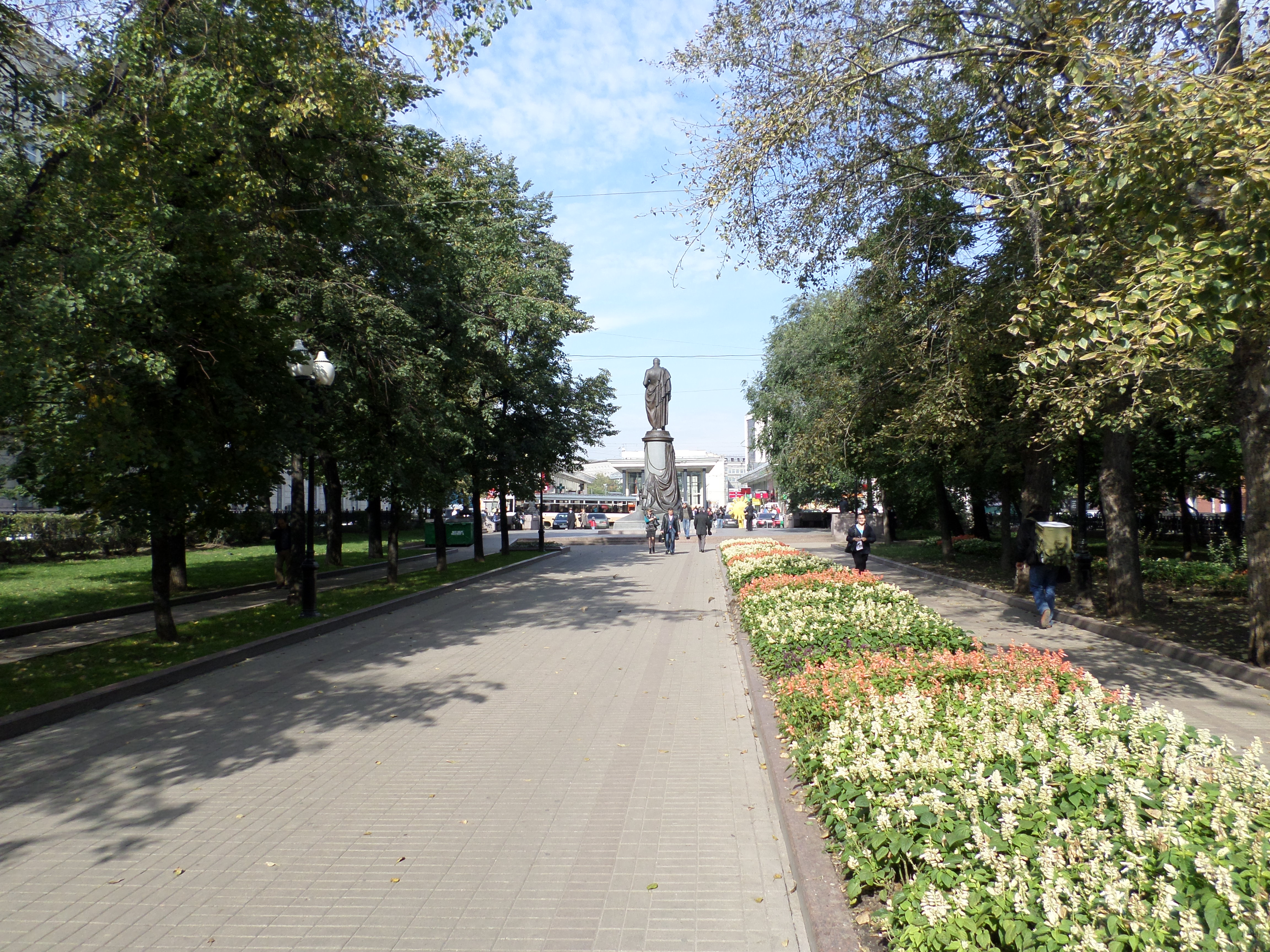

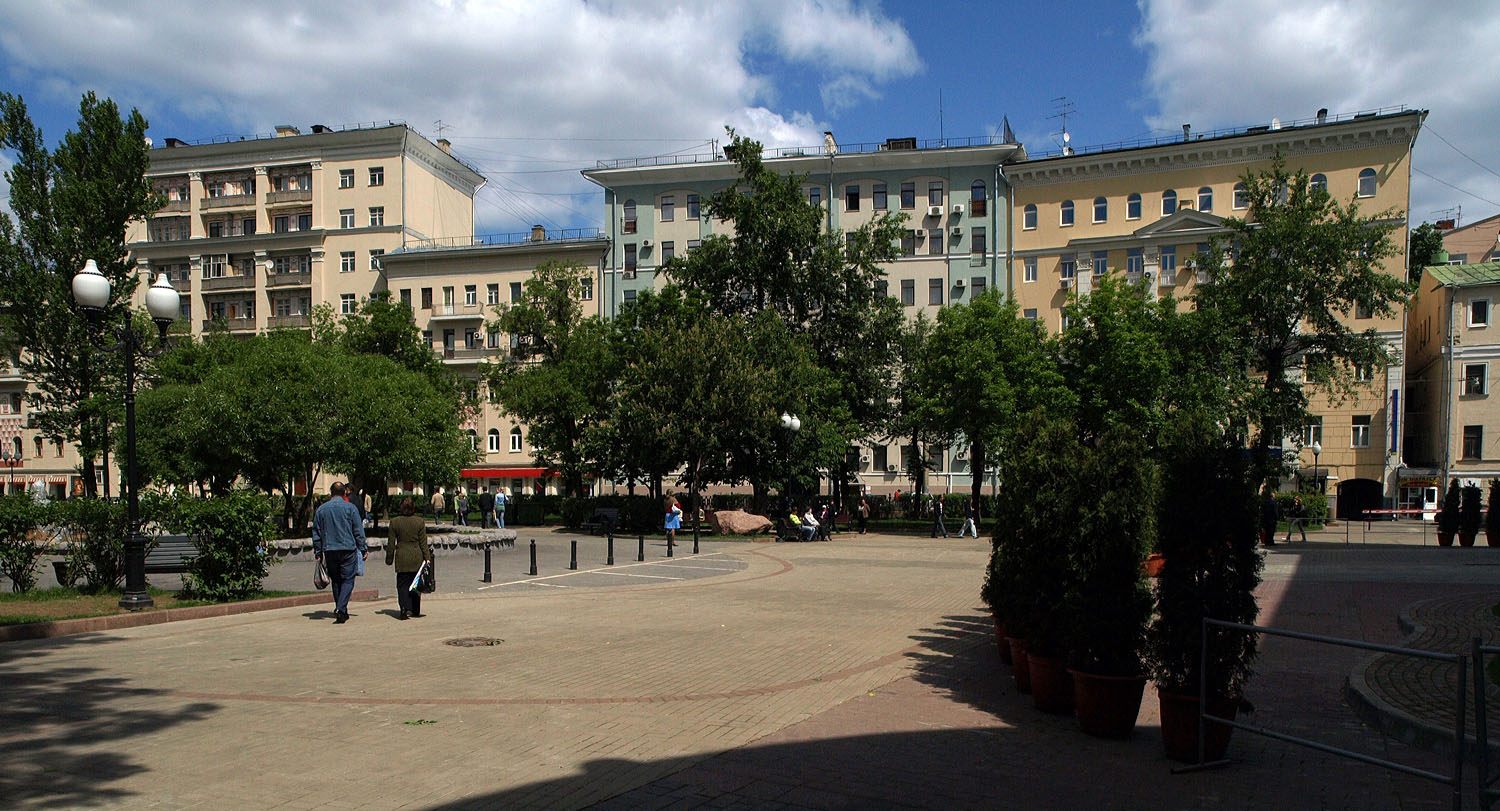

Chistoprudny Boulevard (Russian: Чистопрудный Бульвар) is a major boulevard in the central part of Moscow running from Turgenevskaya Square and Sretensky Boulevard towards Pokrovka Street, where it adjoins Pokrovsky Boulevard. Chistoprudny Boulevard includes Clean Ponds.

With other boulevards, like Tverskoy Boulevard and Yauzsky Boulevard, this is a part of the Boulevard Ring, running as a circle through the central Moscow.
