= Petrovsky Boulevard =

Thoroughfare in Moscow, Russia

Coordinates: 55°46′04″N 37°37′03″E

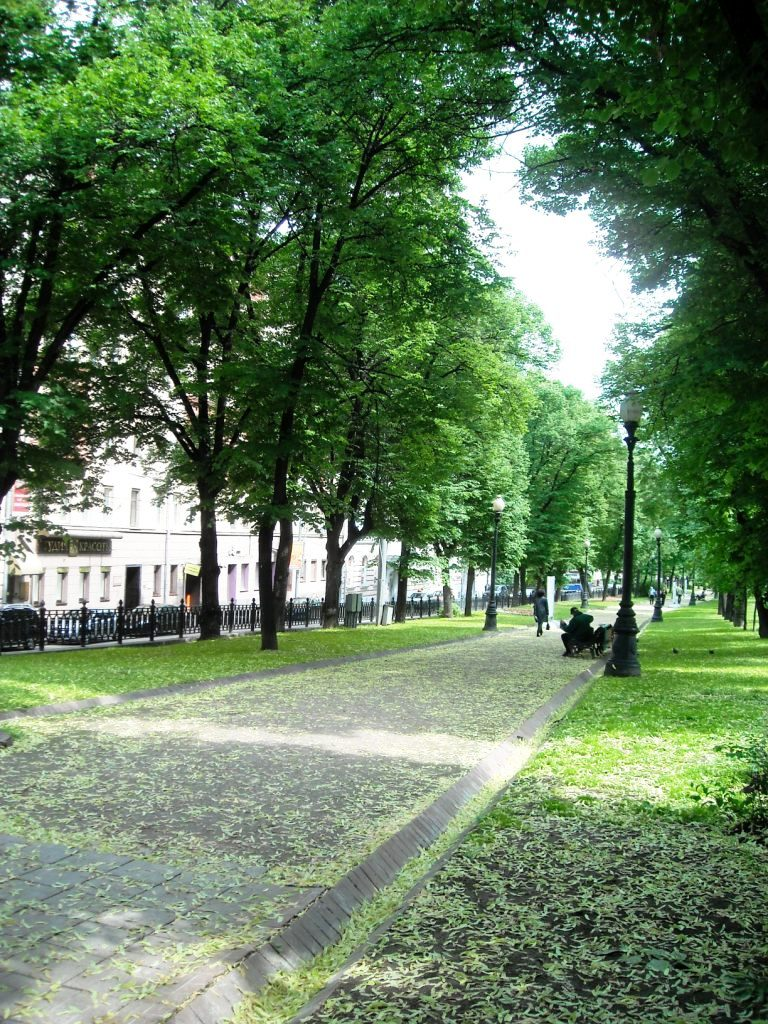
Petrovsky Boulevard

Petrovsky Boulevard, (Russian: Петровский Бульвар), is a major boulevard in Moscow. It begins at the Petrovsky Gates Square (Petrovka Street) and ends at Trubnaya Square, completing the link of Boulevard Ring between Strastnoy Boulevard and Rozhdestvensky Boulevard.

The boulevard (as well as Petrovka Street and Petrovsky Gates) is named after Vysoko-Petrovsky Monastery. Apart from the monastery, there is still a fairly high (but shrinking) share of genuine 19th century buildings.

== Gallery ==
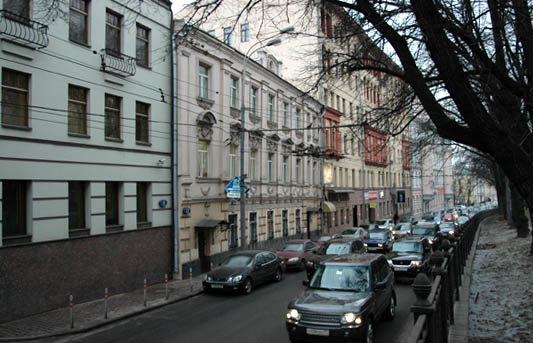

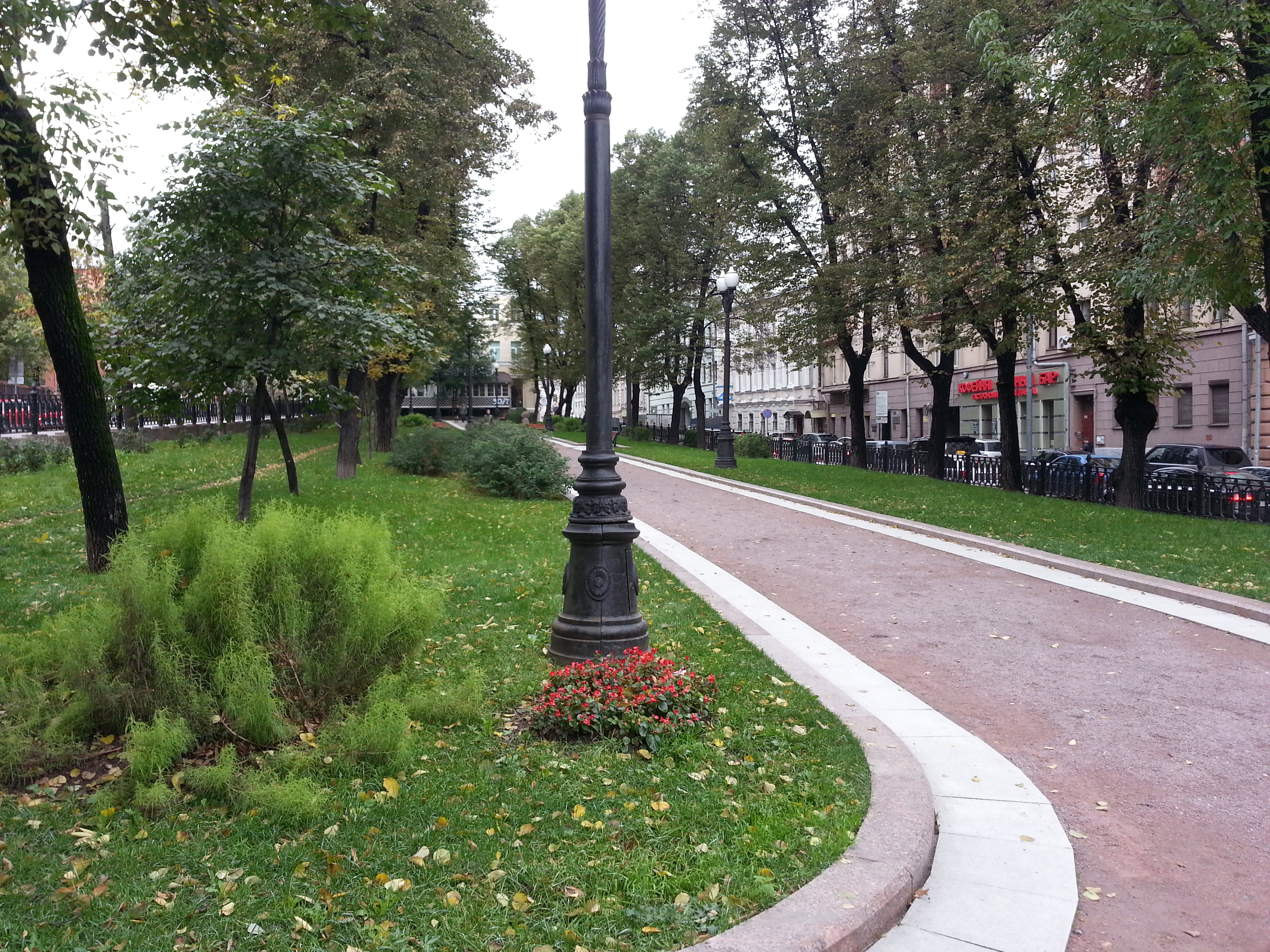

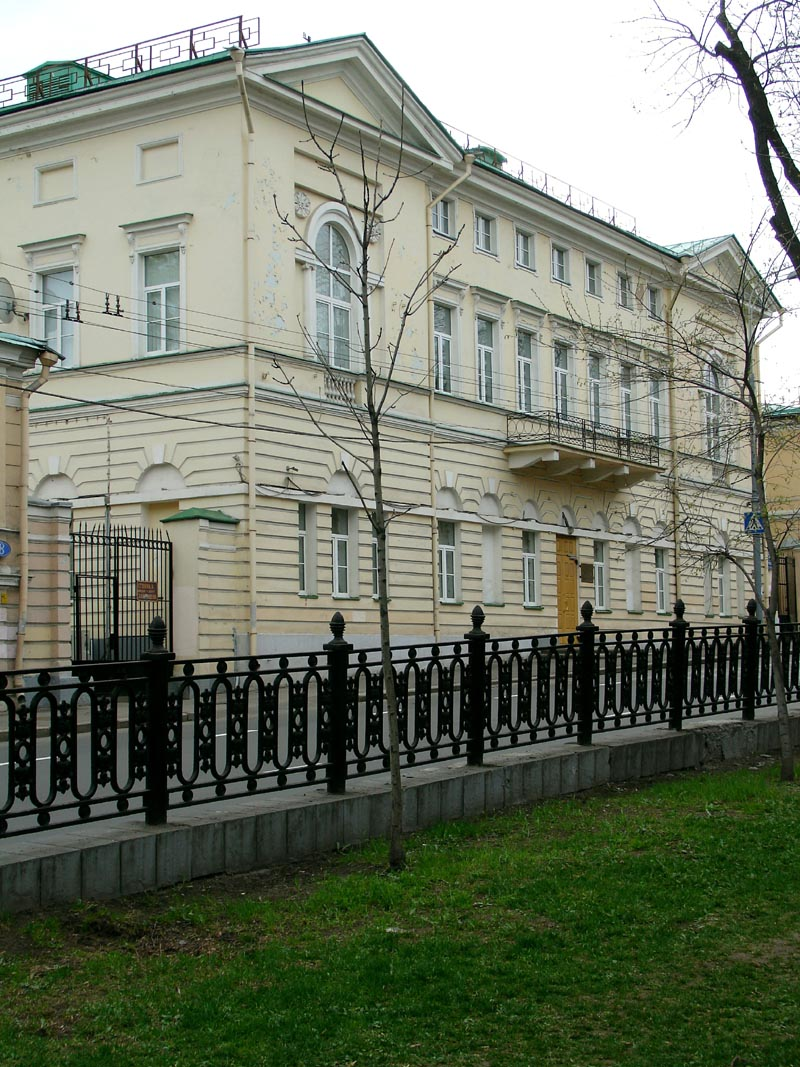
Former high school

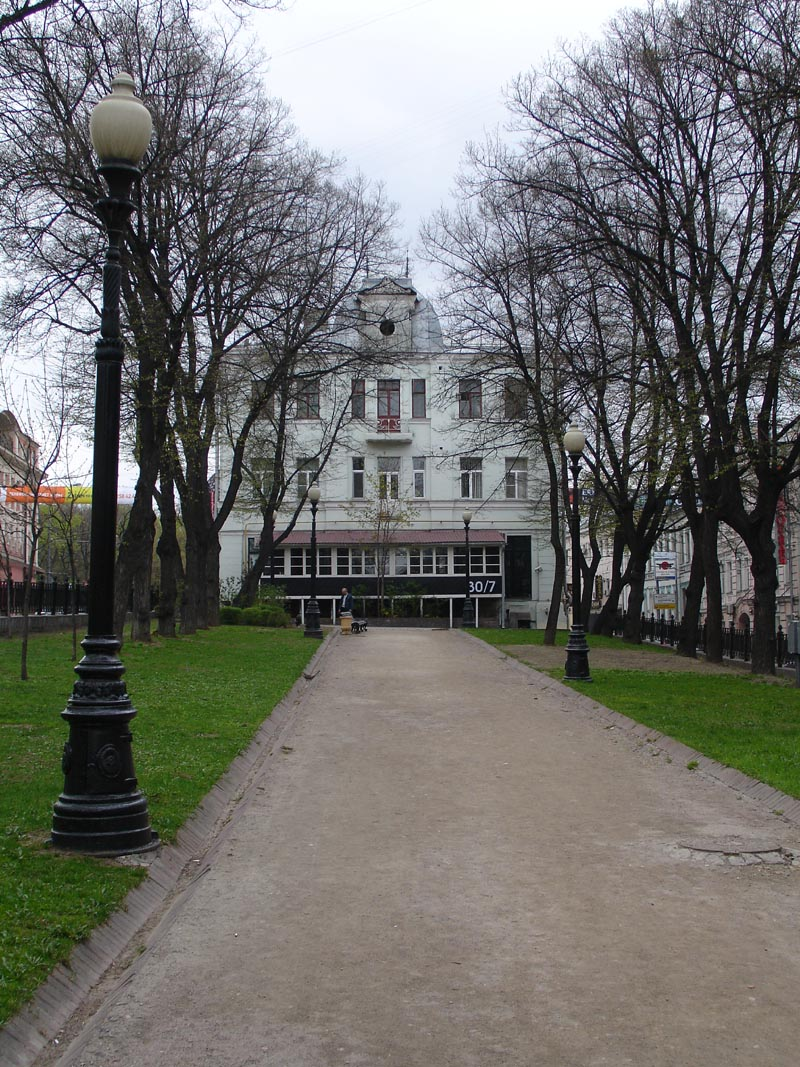
Former hotel at Petrovsky Gates

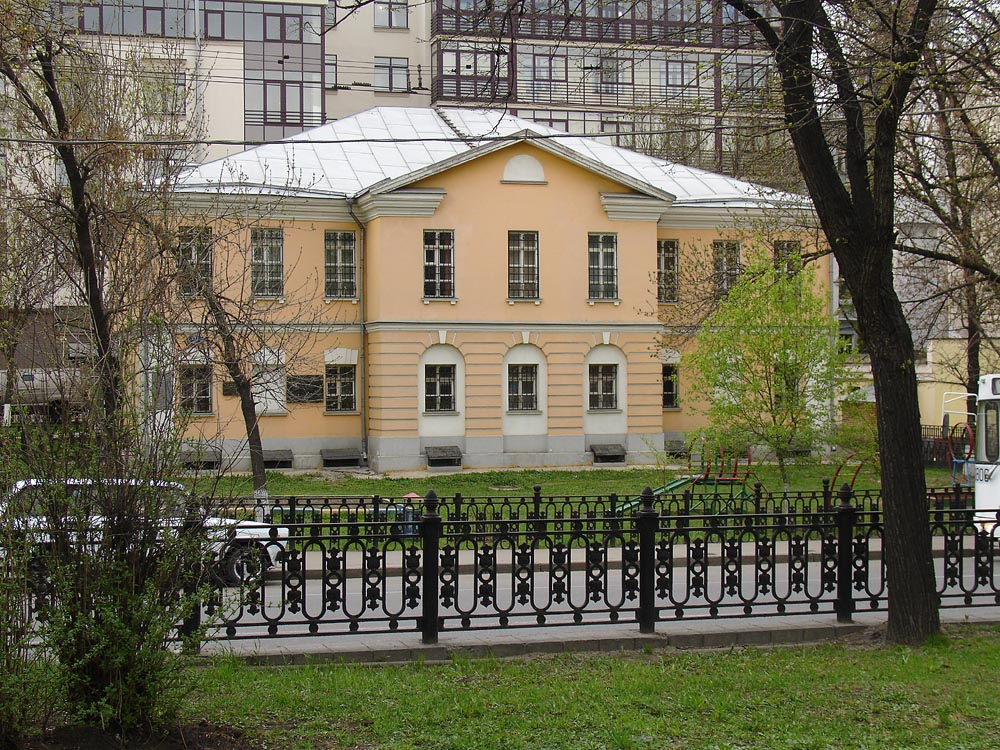
Lunin House

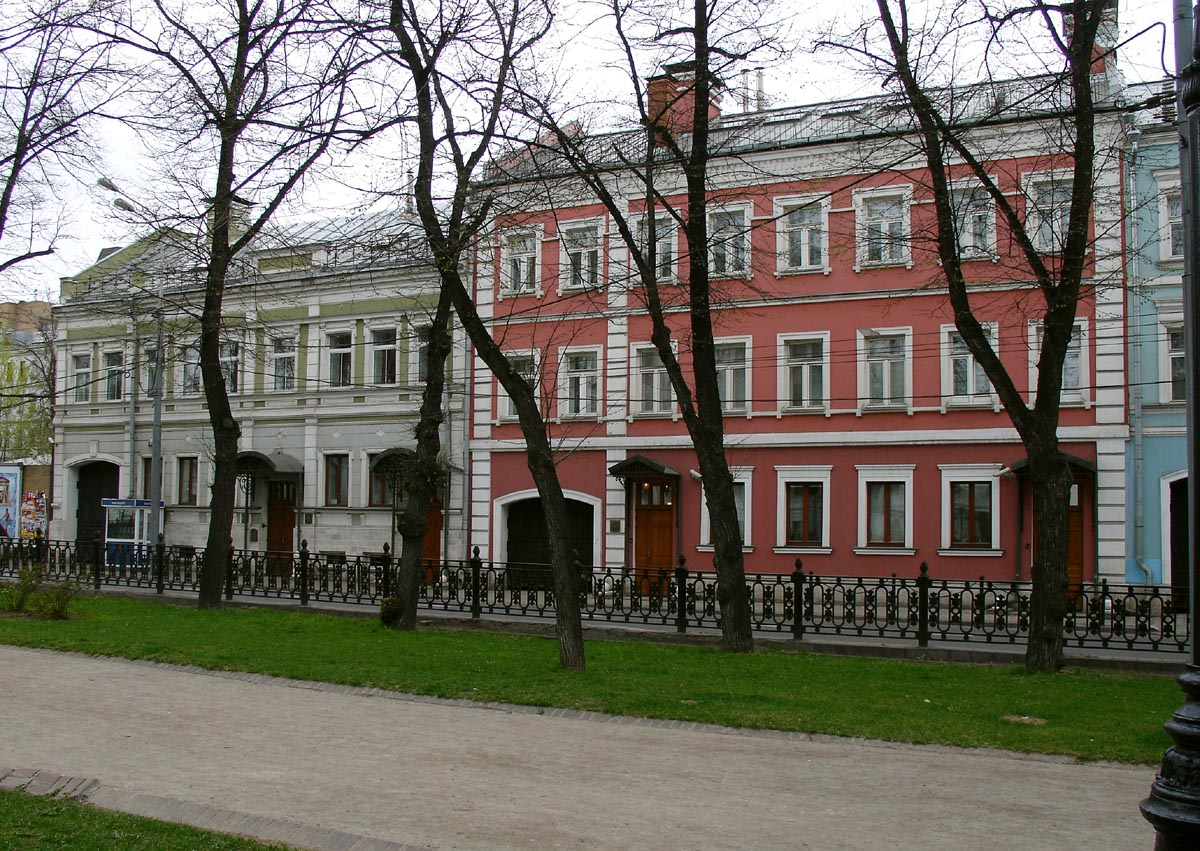
More facadist replicas

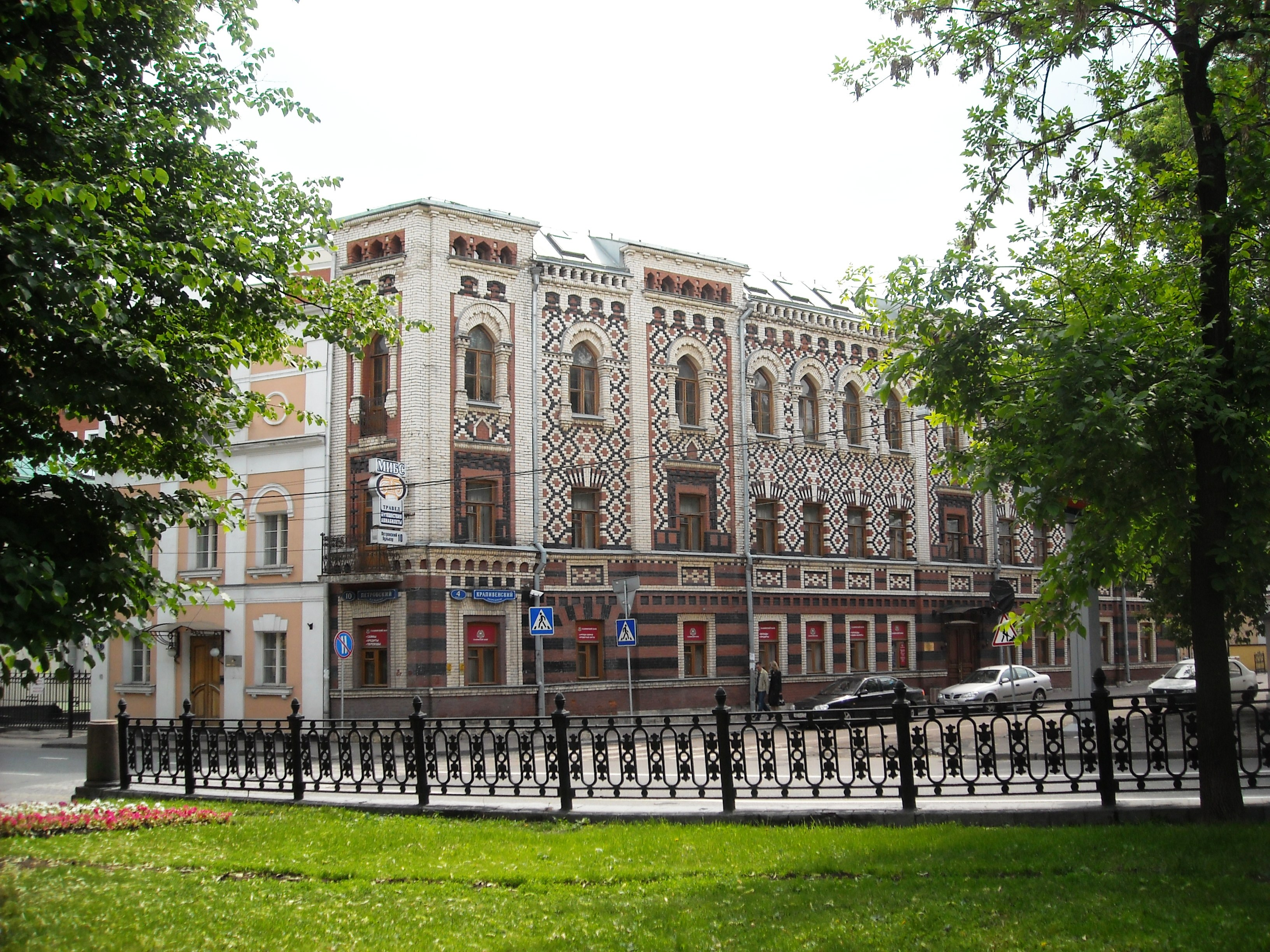
More facadist replicas

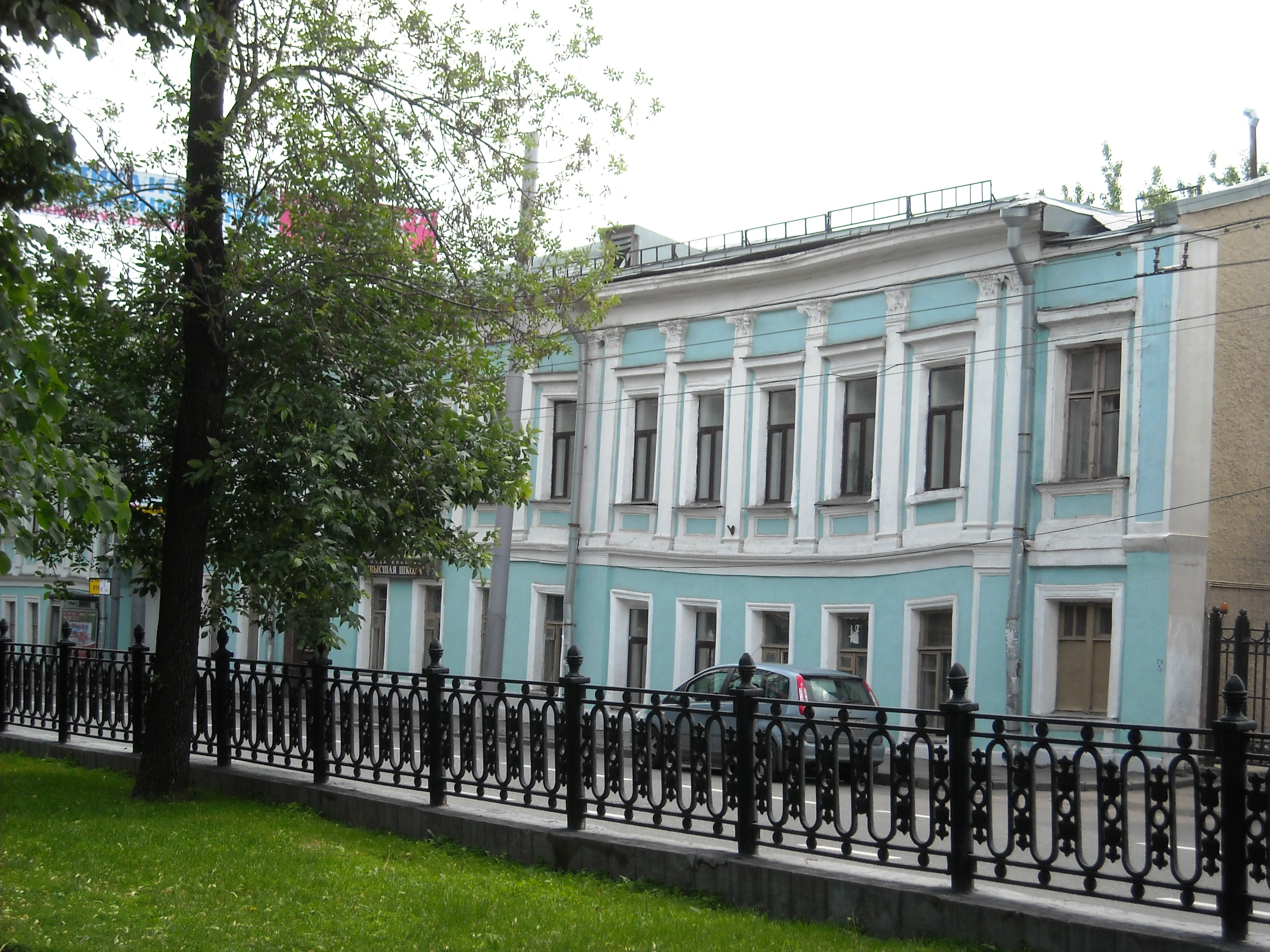
More facadist replicas
