= Gelena Velikanova =

Soviet singer & actress (1923–1998)

- Гелена Великанова
- Born: Gelena Martselievna Velikanova; 27 February 1923; Moscow, USSR
- Died: 10 November 1998 (aged 75); Moscow, Russian Federation
- Resting place: Vagankovo Cemetery, Moscow
- Occupation: singer
- Years active: 1950–1998
- Title: People's Artist of Russia (1992)
- Spouse: Nikolay Dorizo

Gelena Martselievna Velikanova (Russian: Гелена Марцелиевна Великановна, 27 February 1923 – 10 November 1998) was a Soviet traditional pop performer, who popular in the 1950s and 1960s and best remembered for her 1959 hit "Landyshi" (Lily of the Valley). She was honoured with the People's Artist of Russia title in 1992. Velikanova then lost her voice due to incompetent medical treatment and had to stop performing. She died in 1998, two hours before her farewell concert in Moscow.

== Biography ==
Gelena Velikanova was born in Moscow; both her parents came from Poland, her father Marceli Welikanis, was a half-Lithuanian. She graduated from the secondary school in 1941 but had to abandon her plans of joining the musical college, due to the outbreak of World War II broke and her family were subsequently evacuated to Tomsk. In 1944 Gelena returned to Moscow, enrolled into the Glazunov Musical college. After the graduation, she continued her education in the Estrada department of the Moscow Art Theater School Studio.

In 1948, Gelena Velikanova debuted as a professional singer. In 1950, she started to perform regularly as a member of the Mosconcert stuff. Soon, she turned to more serious on music; songs with lyrics based on the poems by Sergey Esenin and Novella Matveyeva, among others, started to appear in her repertoire. Velikanova's musical development has been influenced by her husband, poet Nikolai Dorizo. In 1969 Gelena Velikanova was honoured with the title Meritorious Artist of RSFSR, but soon lost the crystal-clear timbre of her high-pitched voice, due to incompetent medical treatment for her vocal chords. In 1986-1996 she taught at the Gnesin College and in the Russian Academy of Theatre Arts.

In mid-1990s Velikanova enjoyed the renewed interest in her musical legacy. On 16 April 1998, the Velikanova Star was set at the Rossiya concert hall square. On 10 November 1998, the singer was about to give her farewell concert at the Moscow Actor House. She died in her home two hours before the show. She was buried at the Vagankovskoye Cemetery, in Moscow.

== Discography ==
Studio albums

- 1958 — Vsyo ravno vesna priydyot (Russian: Всё равно весна придёт, lit. 'Spring Will Come Anyway')
- 1961 — V novogodnyuyu noch' (Russian: В новогоднюю ночь, lit. 'At New Year's Night')
- 1971 — Gelena Velikanova
- 1988 — Vospominanie (Russian: Воспоминание, lit. 'Flashback')

Singles

- "Наша песенка простая" (1956)
- "Пичирильо" (1956)
- "Песня выпускников" (1956)
- "Осенние листья" / "Песенка молодых соседей" (1956)
- "Маленькая Мари" (1956)
- "Первая звезда" / "Если нас двое" (1958)
- "Поезда" / "Ландыши" (1958)
- "Дальняя песенка" / "До завтра" (1959)
- "Ты не всё сказал" (1959)
- "Тишина" / "Всё равно, весна придёт" (1959)
- "В лесу дождик" (1959)
- "Песенка про птиц" (1960)
- "Эй Рулатэ" / "Ой ты, рожь" (1961)
- "В Сибири далёкой" / "Как пропал солдат" (1962)
- "Эй Рулатэ" / "Ой ты, рожь" (1961)
- "Не знала я" / "Первый снег" (1963)
- "Другу" / "На кургане" (1964)
- "Поёт Гелена Великанова" (1968)
- "Пусть у каждого будет свой дом" (1968)
- "Гелена Великанова" (1970)
- "Песни из спектакля "Вкус черешни"" (1970)
- "Сыпь, тальянка" / "Жаль, что время ушло" (1971)
- "Я не тороплюсь" (1972)
- "У той горы" (1974)
- "Выдумка зимняя" (1976)

Compilations

- 2003 — "Zolotaya kollektsiya retro" (BoMB 033-110)
- 2005 — "Velikie ispolniteli XX veka" (dMR 80905 CD, dMR 81005 CD)
