= Rozhdestvenka =

Rozhdestvenka (Russian: Рождественка) is the name of several rural localities in Russia:

- Rozhdestvenka, Amur Oblast, a selo in Novosergeyevsky Selsoviet of Seryshevsky District, Amur Oblast
- Rozhdestvenka, Astrakhan Oblast, a selo in Batayevsky Selsoviet of Akhtubinsky District, Astrakhan Oblast
- Rozhdestvenka, Belgorod Oblast, a selo in Grayvoronsky District, Belgorod Oblast
