= Murad Kazhlayev =

Azerbaijani composer (1931–2023)

Murad Kazhlayev Мурад Кажлаев
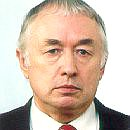
- Kazhlayev in 1993

Background information
- Born: 15 January 1931 Baku, Transcaucasian SFSR, Soviet Union (present-day Azerbaijan)
- Died: 23 December 2023 (aged 92) Makhachkala, Dagestan, Russia
- Genres: Classical
- Occupations: Composer; conductor; teacher

Murad Magomedovich Kazhlayev (Note: Russian: Мурад Магомедович Кажлаев, romanized: Murad Magomedovich Kazhlayev; Azerbaijani: Murad Maqomedoviç Kajlayev) (15 January 1931 – 23 December 2023) was a Russian and Lak composer and conductor. He was a People's Artist of the USSR (1981), People's Artist of the Republic of Dagestan (2016), and laureate of international premiums and contests. He was also Artistic Director and Chief Conductor of the Great Academic Concert Orchestra named after Silantyev, a professor and academician at Russian Academy of Natural Sciences.

== Biography ==
Murad Kajlayev was born on 15 January 1931 in Baku to a Lak family.

He graduated from Baku State Conservatoire from the composition class of Boris Zeidman. He was expelled from there for his ardour for practicing non-academic musical genres but soon he was reclaimed. He worked as a teacher at a musical school named after Pyotr Ilyich Tchaikovsky, in Makhachkala, as a chief conductor of the Dagestan Radio Symphonic Orchestra (1957–1958), artistic director of the Dagestan Philharmonic Hall (1963–1964) and secretary of administration of the Union of Soviet Composers (from 1968). He is the composer of the current anthem of Dagestan used since 2016.

Kajlayev died on 23 December 2023, at the age of 92.

== Awards ==
- Hero of Labour of the Russian Federation (2021)
- Honoured Artist of the RSFSR (1960)
- People's Artist of the USSR (1981)
- Order of the Red Banner of Labour (1971)
- Order "For Merit to the Fatherland" of the III and IV degrees (2008, 1995)
- Order of Friendship (2014)
- The honorary diploma of the President of Azerbaijan for his services to the development of cultural ties between Azerbaijan and Russia (2021)
- Glinka State Prize of the RSFSR (1970)

== Family ==
His father was Magomed Davudovich (1894-1963; otolaryngologist, Doctor of Medical Sciences), his mother was Yelena Mikhailovna (1908-1983; phoniatrician).

He was married to Valida Islamovna Kajlayeva. His son is Hadjimurat Kajlayev (born 1962).
