= Gamzat Tsadasa =

Soviet Avar poet (1877–1951)

- Born: 9 August 1877; Tsada village, Khunzakhsky District, Dagestan Oblast, Russian Empire
- Died: 11 June 1951 (aged 73); Makhachkala, Dagestan ASSR
- Occupation: Poet
- Title: People's poet of the Dagestan ASSR (USSR) (1934)
- Writing career
- Genre: Socialist realism
- Notable awards: Stalin Prize (1951); Order of Lenin (1944); Order of Lenin (1947); Order of the Red Banner of Labor (1939)

Gamzat Tsadasa (Avar: Цӏадаса Хӏамзат, Russian: Гамзат Цадаса; 9 August 1877 – 11 June 1951) was an Avar poet from Dagestan. He is the father of famous Russian writer Rasul Gamzatov.

== Life ==
Gamzat Tsadasa was born on 9 August 1877 in the Avar village of Tsada in the north-east Caucasus, in Russian Empire in the family of a poor peasant. His surname "Tsadasa" is a pseudonym and comes from the name of the village "Tsada" (translated from Avar - "from Tsada"). Early became an orphan, his father Yusupil Magoma died when he was 7 years old, his mother soon died.

Gamzat studied in madrasah. For three years he was an imam and a judge in his native village of Tsada. Later he relinquished this title. For some time he worked on the railroad and at the timber rafting. In 1908-1917 he was engaged in agriculture (a grain grower). In 1917–1919, Gamzat Tsadasa was a member of the Khunzakh Sharia Court. In 1921-1922 he worked as the editor of the Krasnye Gory newspaper, where he published his first poems.

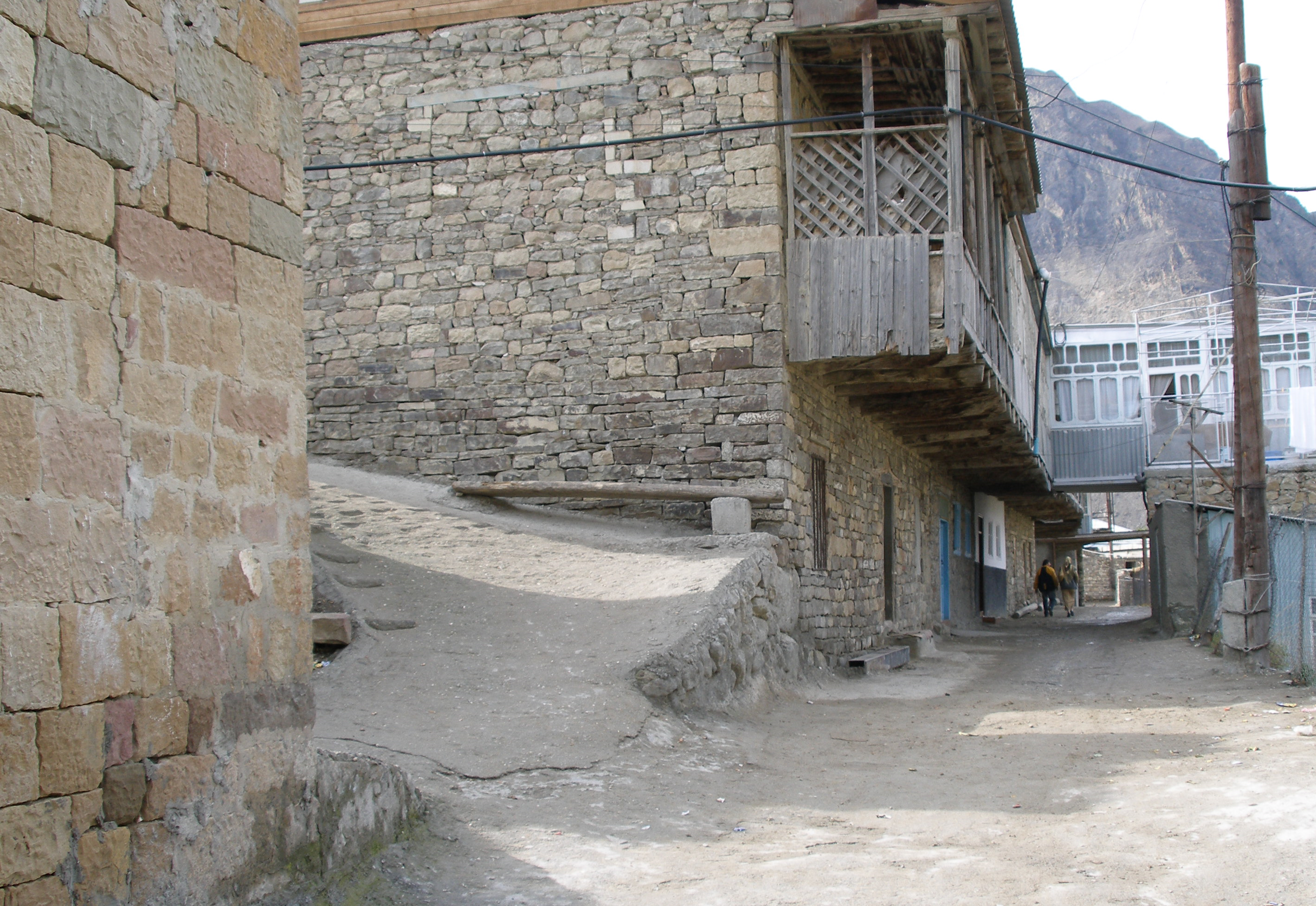
The house where Gamzat Tsadasa lived

In 1923-1925 he was chairman of the revolutionary Sharia court. In 1925-1932 he worked as a clerk of the Khunzakh regional executive committee. In 1932-1933 he worked as the secretary of the editorial office of the regional newspaper "Highlander". Since 1925, Gamzat Tsadasa was a permanent deputy of the Khunzakh District Council of Workers' Deputies. Member of the Presidium Council of the USSR since 1934. Delegate of the I Congress of Soviet Writers with the right of an advisory vote. In 1934 he was elected a member of the Central Executive Committee of Dagestan. Since 1950, he was elected a deputy of the USSR Supreme Council of the 3rd convocation, and was also elected a deputy of the Supreme Council of the Dagestan ASSR for the second time.

Gamzat Tsadasa died on June 11, 1951, in Makhachkala. He is buried in the city center (Rasul Gamzatov avenue)

== Legacy ==
The beginning of his literary path dates back to 1891, with his first poem “The Dog of Alibek”. He wrote literary works of a socially accusatory nature, his poems, jokes were directed against various established norms adats, mullahs, wealthy people, traders. After the October Revolution in his writings Gamzat Tsadasa positioned himself as a promoter of the new life of the working highlanders ("October", "The Old Woman's Word on the Day of March 8", "Old and New", "Stalin", "To Revenge", "Mountain Peaks”, “Broom of Adats”, etc.). The first collection of poems "The Broom of Adats" was published in 1934. In the same year, "as the oldest poet, revered by the broad masses of the working highlanders," he became the first people's poet of Dagestan.

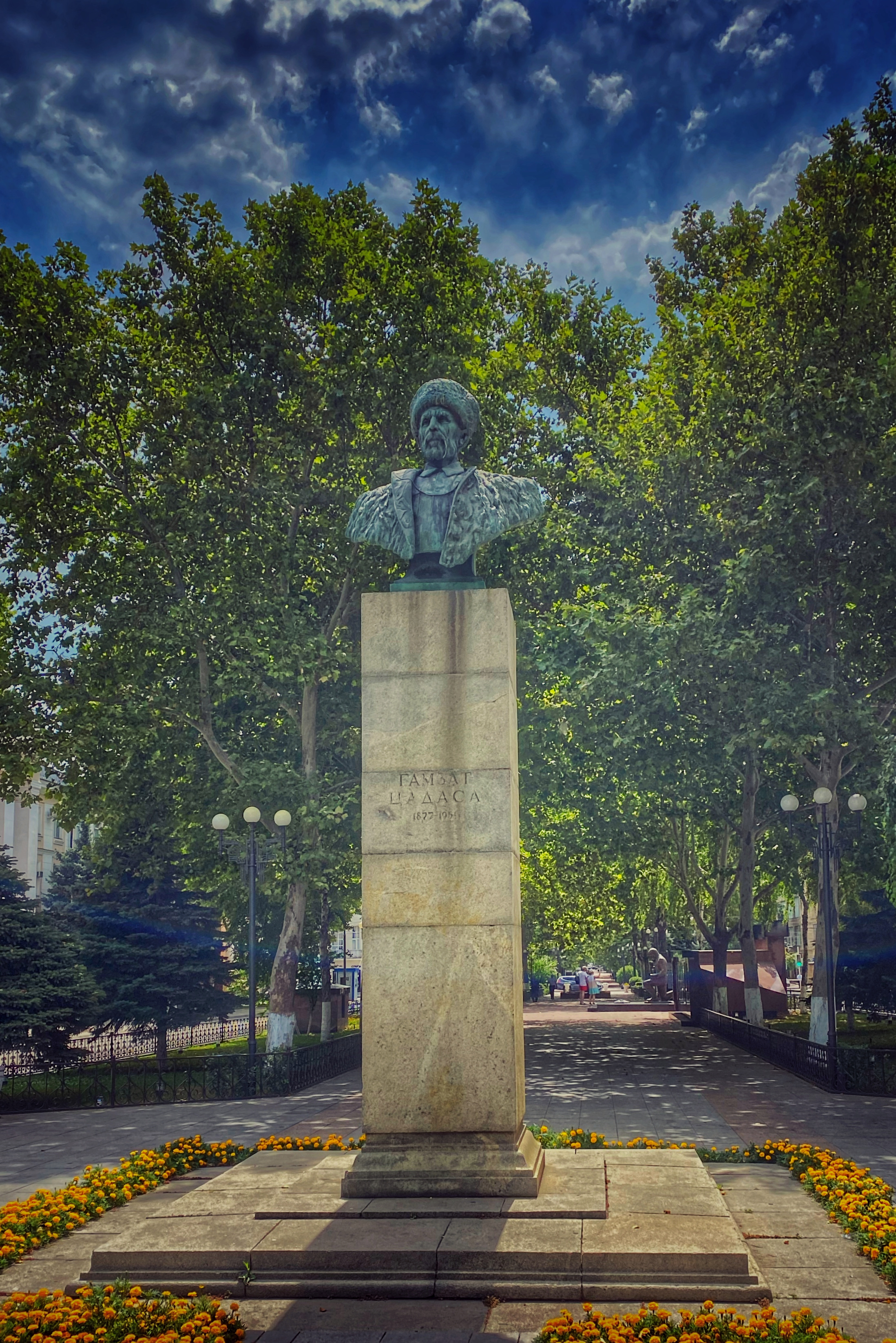
Gamzat Tsadasa Monument in Makhachkala

Gamzat Tsadasa is the first author of Avar fables, poems and fairy tales for children. His songs "The Great Patriotic War", as well as a collection of patriotic poems "For the Motherland", gained popularity in Dagestan. Gamzat Tsadasa is the author of the dramas and comedies "The Shoemaker", "Meeting in Battle", "The Marriage of Kadalav". A significant place in the poet's work is occupied by poetic tales ("The Elephant and the Ant", "The Tale of the Hare and the Lion", etc.) and fables ("The Dreamer Shepherd", "My tongue my enemy", etc.). In the last years of his life, he wrote the plays "The Chest of Disasters", "Meeting in Battle", "Khazina", etc., the historical poems "Congratulations to Comrade Stalin on his seventieth birthday", "My Life", "The Tale of the Shepherd". The poet's work is connected with the Avar folklore. Tsadasa translated into Avar language the works of Pushkin.

Dagestan State Avar Theater in Makhachkala was named after Gamzat Tsadasa posthumously in 1951. Gamzat Tsadasa poems and novels were compiled in numerous books and two hand-drawn cartoons were animated based on his fables

- Ant and Elephant (1948)
- Lion and Hare (1949)

In 1967 the museum of Gamzat Tsadasa was opened in his native village of Tsada.

== Awards ==
- Stalin Prize second degree (1951) - for the collection of poems ("The Tale of the Shepherd") (1950)
- Order of Lenin - to commemorate the 50th anniversary of creative activity (1944)
- Order of Lenin - to the 70th birthday (1947)
- Order of the Red Banner of Labor (1939)
- Medal "For the Defence of the Caucasus"
- Medal "For Valiant Labor in the Great Patriotic War 1941-1945"
- Peoples poet of the DASSR (1934)
- Certificates of honor of the Presidium of the Supreme Council of the DASSR
