= Rozhdestvenka, Amur Oblast =

Rozhdestvenka Рождественка
- Selo
- Location within Amur Oblast Location within Russia
- Coordinates: 50°54′N 128°52′E
- Country: Russia
- Region: Amur Oblast
- District: Seryshevsky District
- Time zone: UTC+9:00

Rozhdestvenka (Russian: Рождественка) is a rural locality (a selo) in Novosergeyevsky Selsoviet of Seryshevsky District, Amur Oblast, Russia. The population was 266 as of 2018. There are 7 streets.

== Geography ==
Rozhdestvenka is located on the Tom River, 48 km southeast of Seryshevo (the district's administrative centre) by road. Novosergeyevka is the nearest rural locality.
