= Sretensky Boulevard =

Boulevard in Moscow, Russia

Coordinates: 55°45′59″N 37°38′1″E

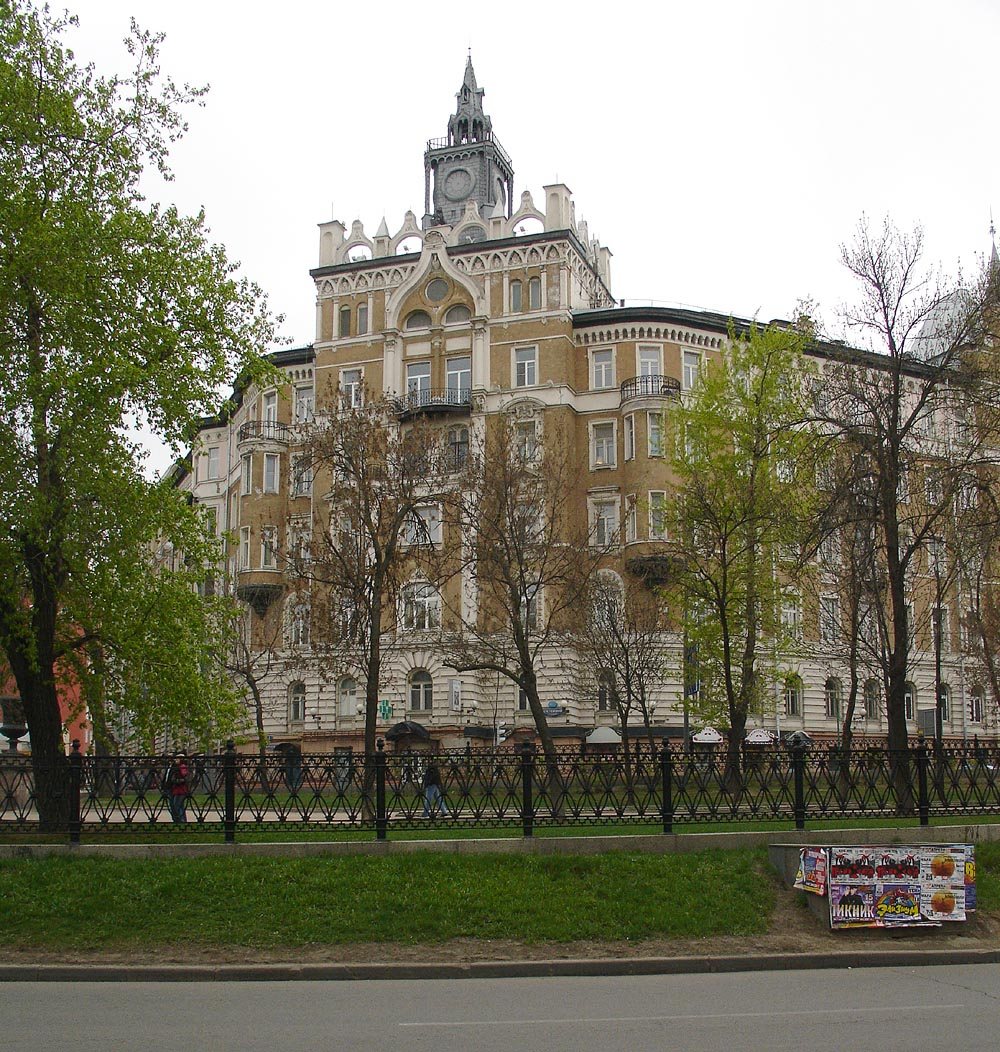
Russian Insurance Company building in Sretensky Boulevard

Sretensky Boulevard (Russian: Сретенский Бульвар) is a major boulevard in central Moscow of important cultural significance, a part of the Boulevard Ring encircling the centre of the city. Sretensky Boulevard's northern end is at Lubyanka Street and Rozhdestvensky Boulevard, and its southern end is at Turgenevskaya Square, where it becomes Chistoprudny Boulevard.

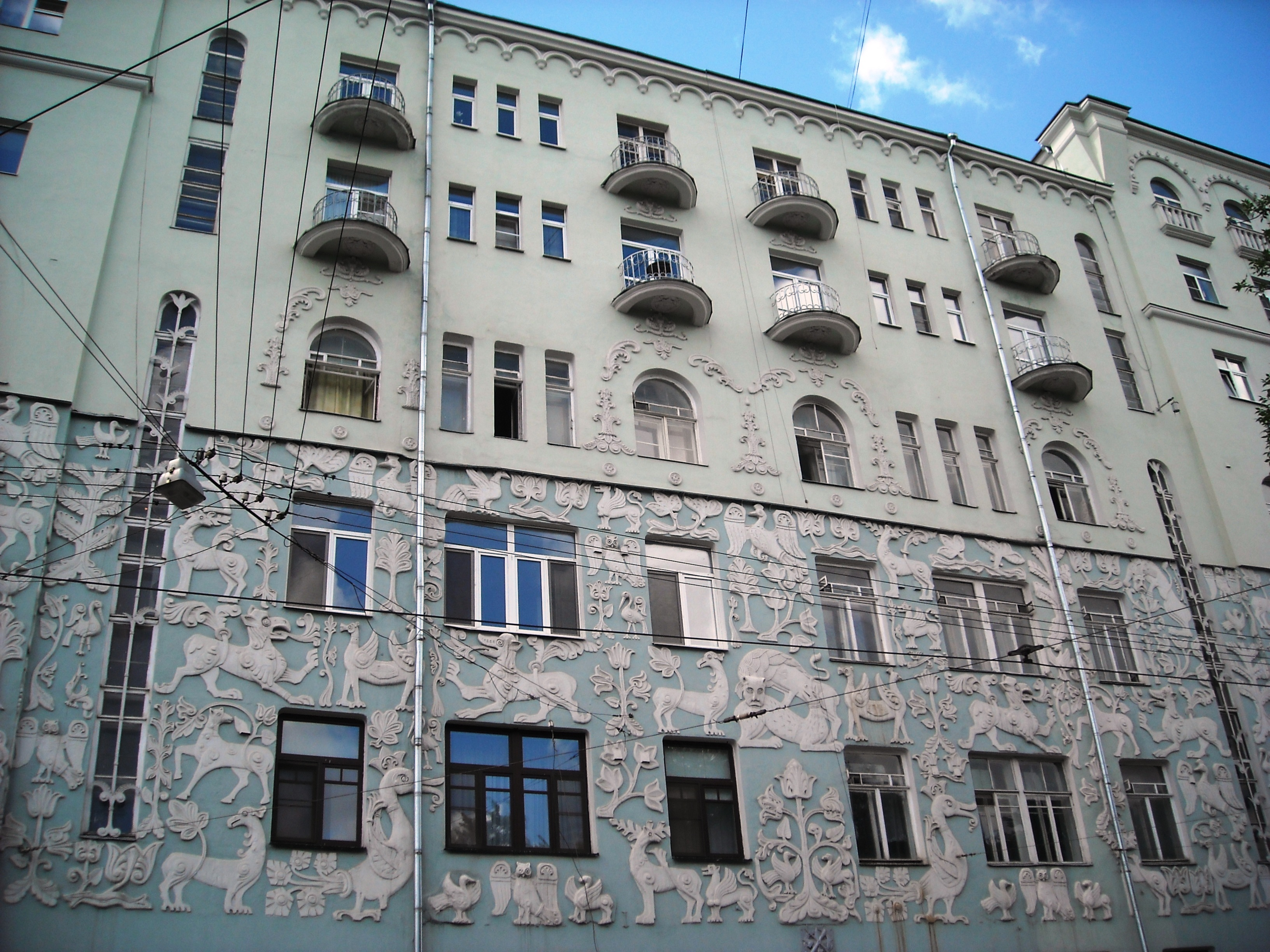
Ornate house in Sretensky Boulevard

Sretensky Boulevard is a major thoroughfare, as it is a part of the Boulevard Ring. The Moscow Metro station called Sretensky Bulvar is a namesake of the boulevard.
