= Rozhdestvensky, Republic of Bashkortostan =

Rozhdestvensky Рождественский
- Village
- Location within Bashkortostan Location within Russia
- Coordinates: 54°49′N 56°18′E
- Country: Russia
- Region: Bashkortostan
- District: Ufimsky District
- Time zone: UTC+5:00

Rozhdestvensky (Russian: Рождественский) is a rural locality (a village) in Kirillovsky Selsoviet, Ufimsky District, Bashkortostan, Russia. The population was 95 as of 2010. There are 3 streets.

== Geography ==
Rozhdestvensky is located 31 km northeast of Ufa (the district's administrative centre) by road. Kirillovo is the nearest rural locality.
