= Pokrovsky Boulevard =

Thoroughfare in Moscow, Russia

Coordinates: 55°45′18″N 37°38′54″E

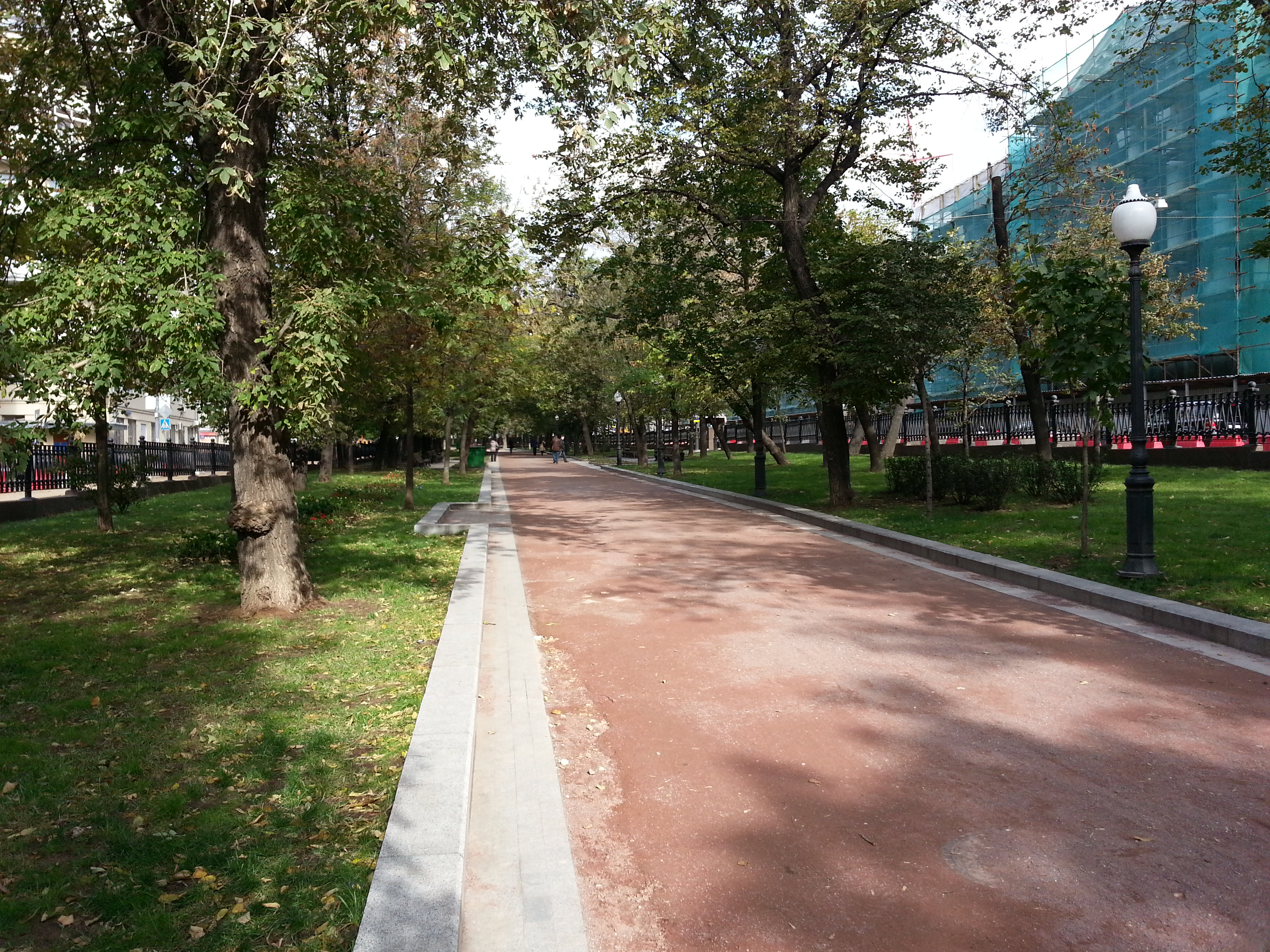

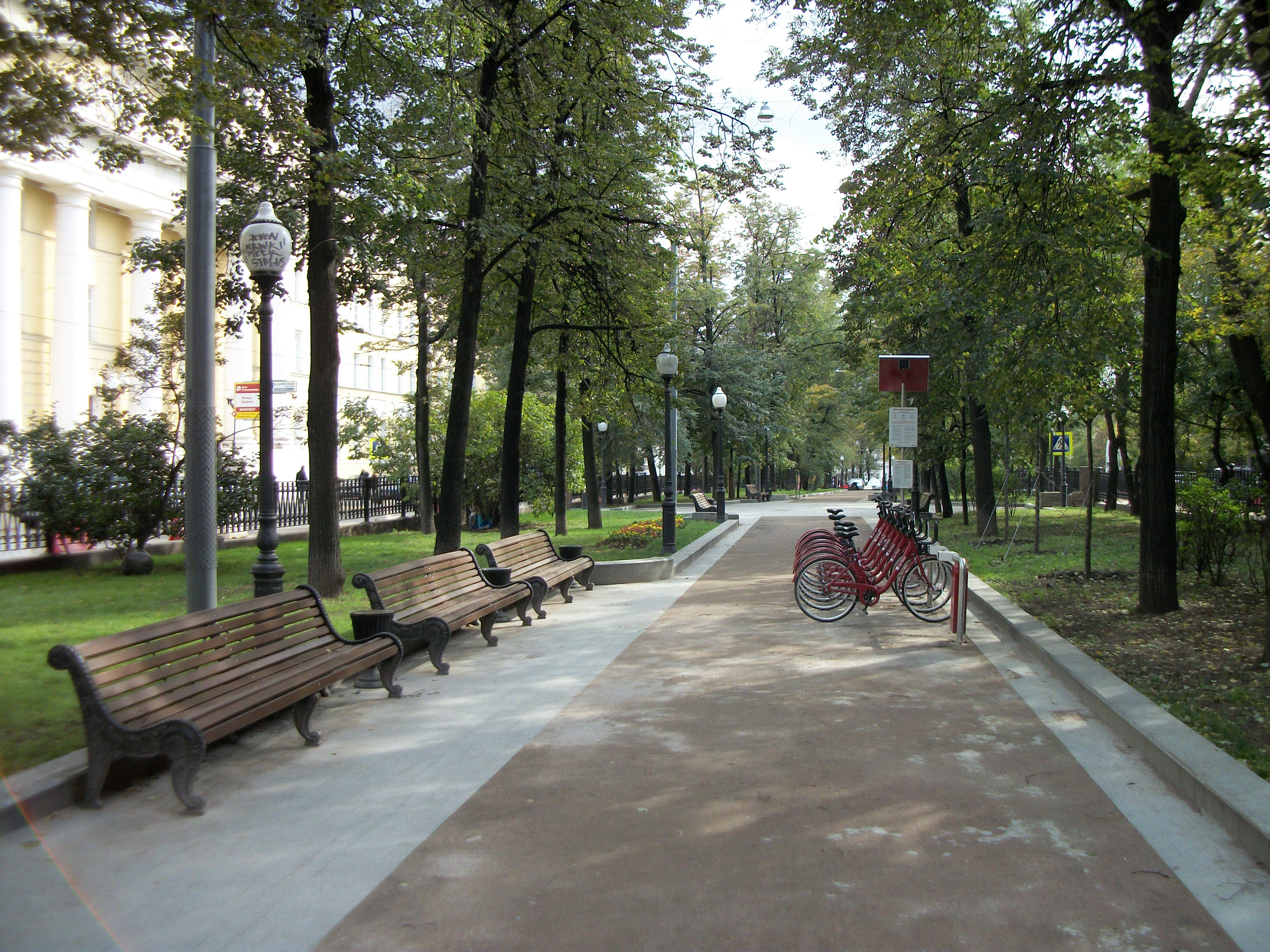

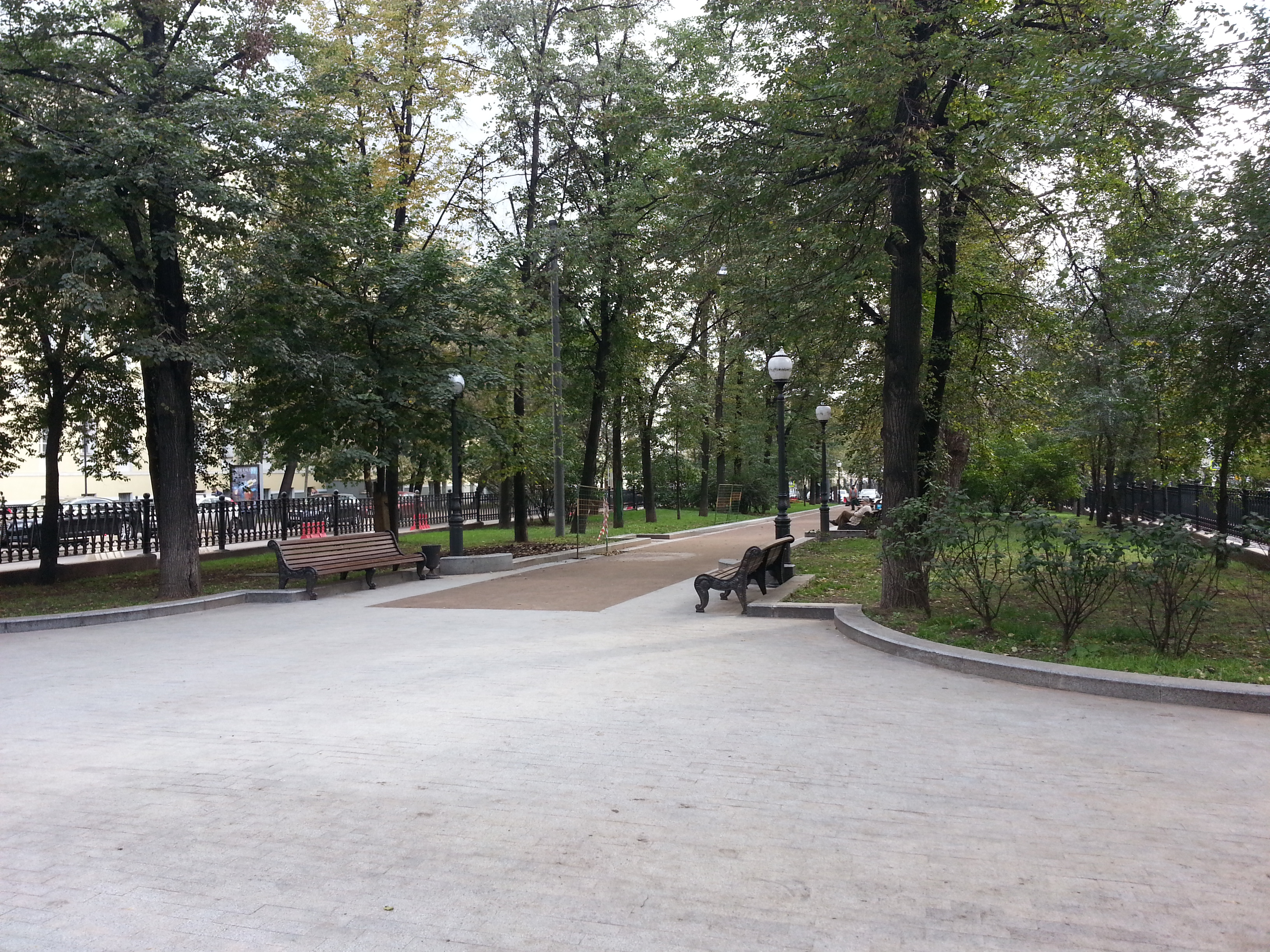

Pokrovsky Boulevard (Russian: Покровский Бульвар) is a major boulevard in the central part of Moscow running from Clean Ponds to Vorontsovo Pole Street, including Yauzsky Boulevard.

With other boulevards like; Tverskoy Boulevard and Chistoprudny Boulevard, this is a part of the Boulevard Ring, running as a circle through the central Moscow.
