= Rozhdestvenskoye, Perm Krai =

Rozhdestvenskoye Рождественское
- Selo
- Location within Perm Krai Location within Russia
- Coordinates: 57°33′N 55°42′E
- Country: Russia
- Region: Perm Krai
- District: Permsky District
- Time zone: UTC+5:00

Rozhdestvenskoye (Russian: Рождественское) is a rural locality (a selo) in Yugo-Kamskoye Rural Settlement, Permsky District, Perm Krai, Russia. The population was 424 as of 2010. There are 9 streets.

== Geography ==
Rozhdestvenskoye is located 75 km southwest of Perm (the district's administrative centre) by road. Novy is the nearest rural locality.
