= Rozhdestvenskoye, Republic of Bashkortostan =

Rozhdestvenskoye Рождественское
- Village
- Location within Bashkortostan Location within Russia
- Coordinates: 55°00′N 56°08′E
- Country: Russia
- Region: Bashkortostan
- District: Blagoveshchensky District
- Time zone: UTC+5:00

Rozhdestvenskoye (Russian: Рождественское) is a rural locality (a village) in Ilyino-Polyansky Selsoviet, Blagoveshchensky District, Bashkortostan, Russia. The population was 104 as of 2010. There are 2 streets.

== Geography ==
Rozhdestvenskoye is located 23 km southeast of Blagoveshchensk (the district's administrative centre) by road. Ashkashla is the nearest rural locality.
