= Chistye Prudy, Bashkortostan =

Chistyye Prudy Чистые Пруды
- Khutor
- Location within Bashkortostan Location within Russia
- Coordinates: 55°25′00″N 55°36′56″E
- Country: Russia
- Region: Bashkortostan
- District: Birsky District

Population (2010)
  - Total: 5
- Time zone: UTC+5:00

Chistyye Prudy (Russian: Чистые Пруды) is a rural locality (a khutor) in Burnovsky Selsoviet, Birsky District, Bashkortostan, Russia. The population was 5 as of 2010.

== Geography ==
Chistye Prudy is located 6 km east of Birsk (the district's administrative centre) by road. Nikolayevka is the nearest rural locality.
