= Rozhdestvensky Boulevard =

Boulevard in Moscow, Russia

Coordinates: 55°45′59″N 37°37′37″E

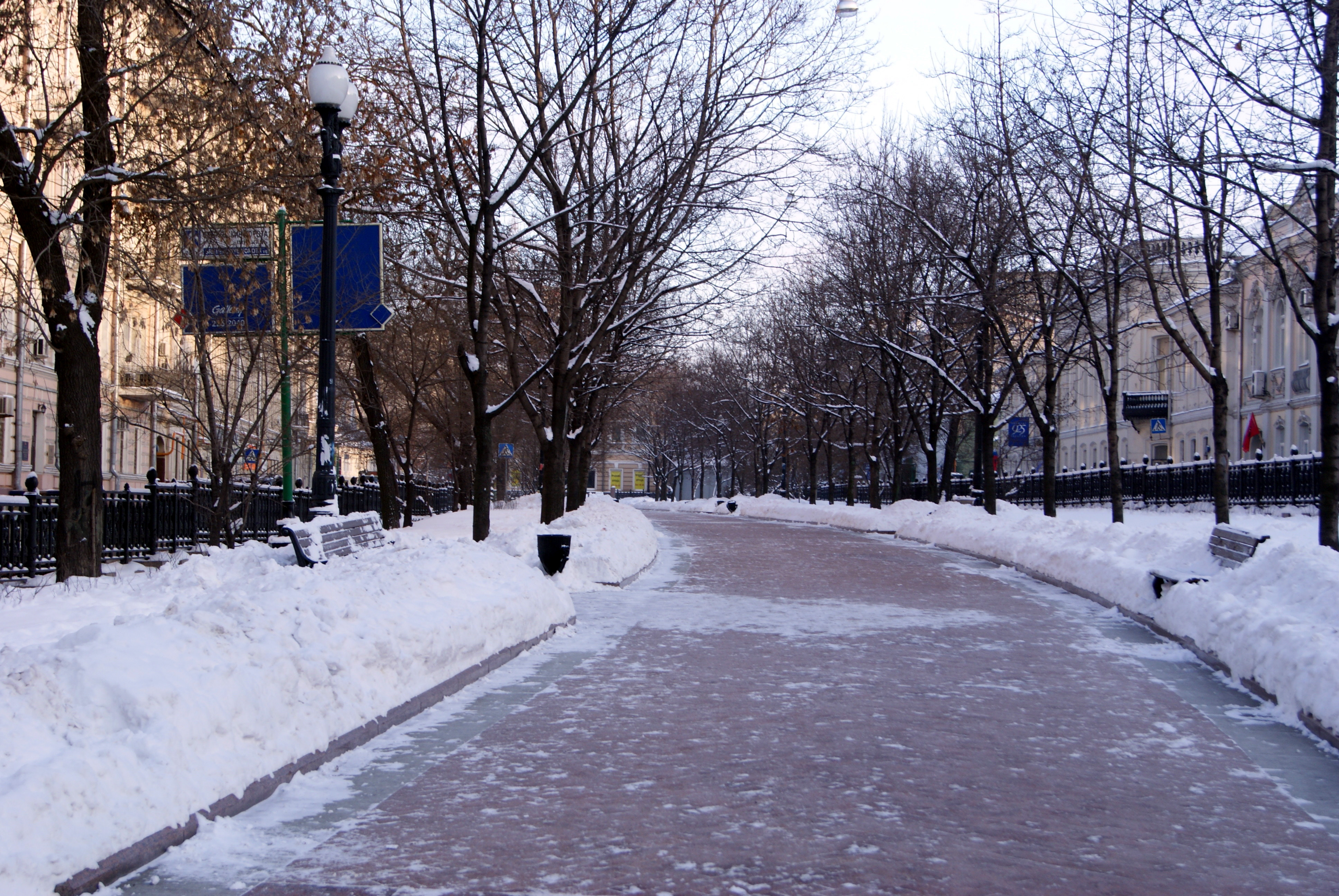
Rozhdestvensky Boulevard

Rozhdestvensky Boulevard (Russian: Рождественский Бульвар, Roschdestvensky Boulevard) is a major boulevard in Meshchansky District of Moscow, Russia. It begins at Trubnaya Square (west) and ends at Sretenka Gates in the same district (completing the Boulevard Ring link from Petrovsky Boulevard to Sretensky Boulevard.

The boulevard is named after Nativity of Our Lady Convent (although sometimes incorrectly interpreted as Christmas boulevard in expatriate newsletters), which emerged in 14th century simultaneously with nearby Sretensky (male) Monastery. The fortress wall existed here from 1590s to 1760; boulevard was planted in 1820s, after the Fire of Moscow (1812) cleared way for city redevelopment.

Apart from the operating monastery, present-day boulevard retains a few historical buildings, while others were replaced with concrete replicas or torn down completely. The blocks immediately north from Trubnaya Square (Trubnaya Street, Pechatnikov Lane) are being redeveloped right now.

Notable buildings:

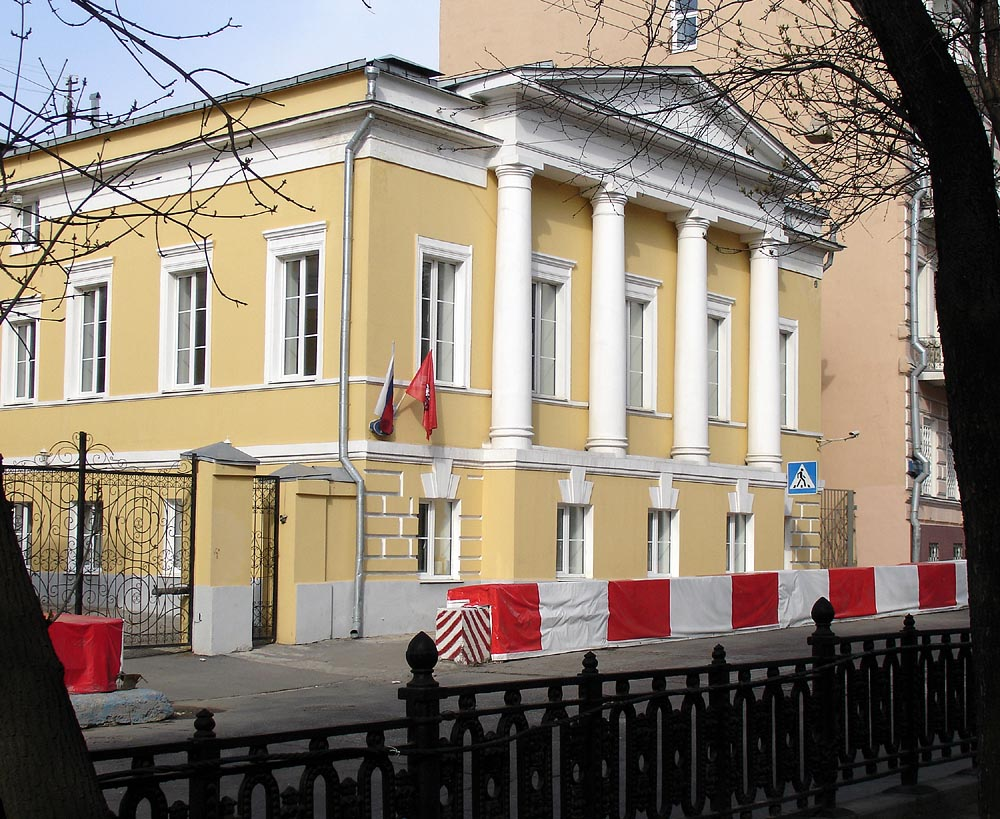
№ 13, a 1980s replica of 1820s Lagofit Estate

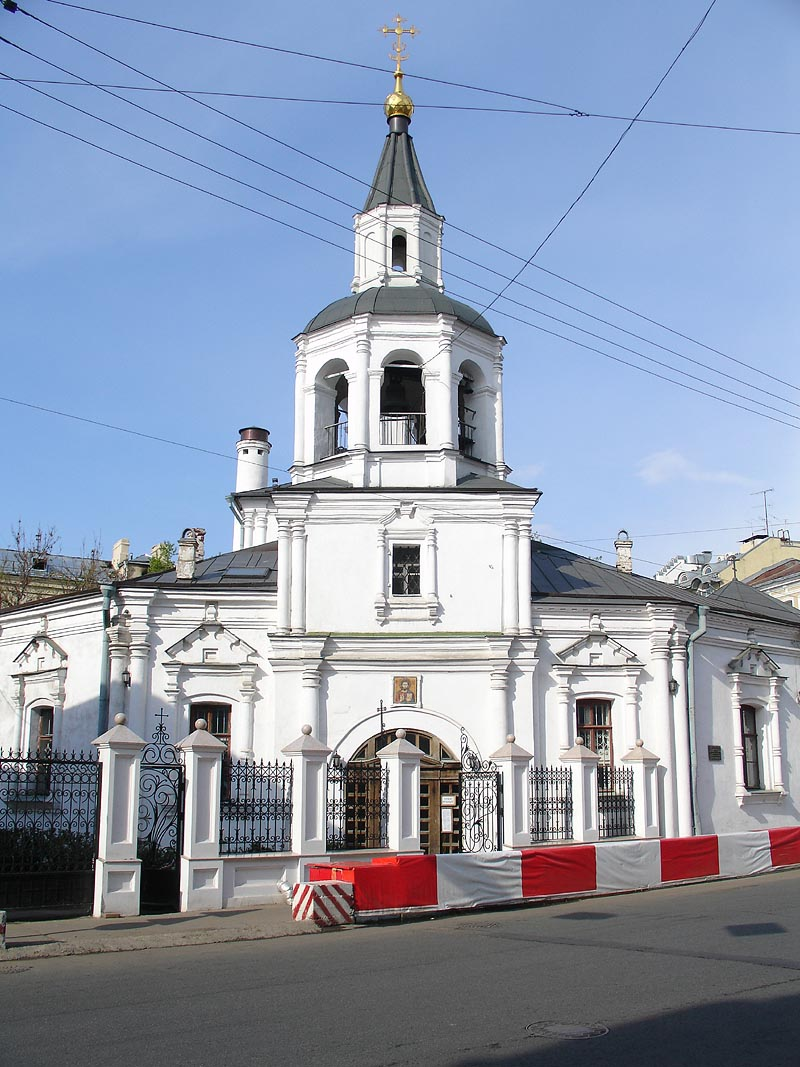
№ 25, Sretenka Gates church

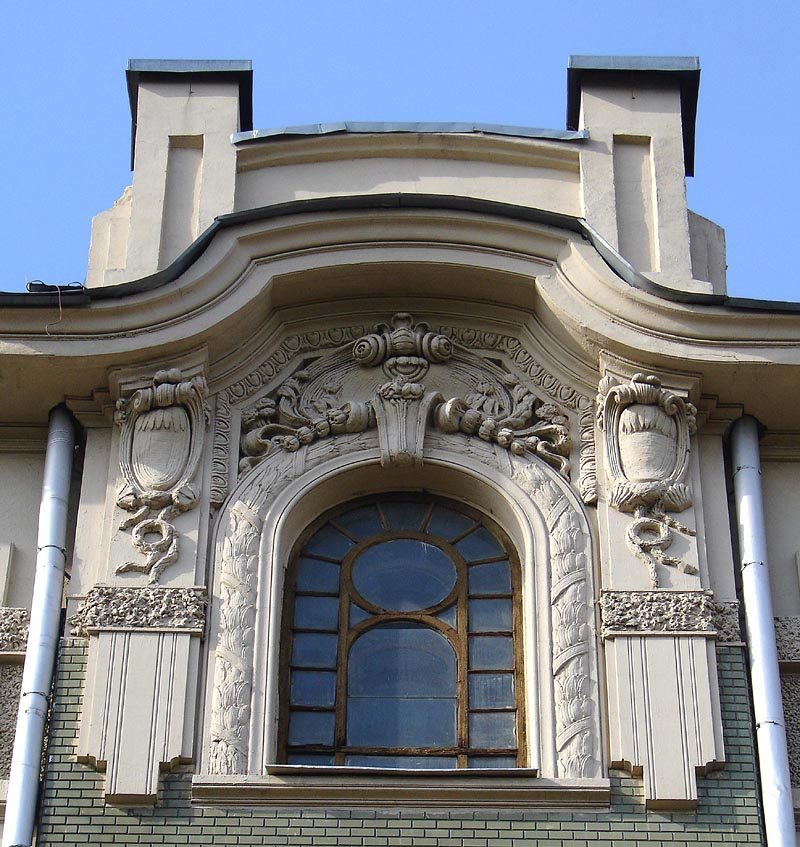
№ 17, 1910s Art Nouveau buildings by Trubnaya Square

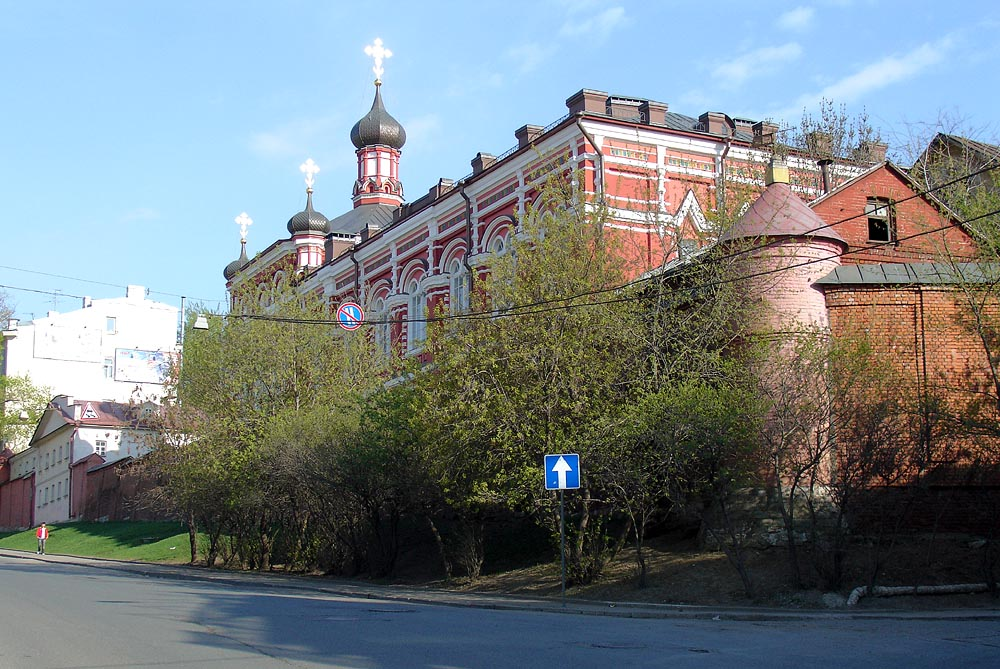
Nativity of Our Lady Monastery commemorates the birth of Mary
