= Rozhdestvensky (surname) =

Rozhdestvensky (Russian: Рождественский; masculine) or Rozhdestvenskaya (feminine) is a Russian surname originated in clergy, derived from the term Рождество Христово, 'Christmas'. Notable persons with the surname include:

- Anatoly Rozhdestvensky (1920–1983), Soviet paleontologist
- Gennady Rozhdestvensky (1931–2018), Russian musical conductor
- Natalya Rozhdestvenskaya (1900–1997), Russian soprano
- Platon Rozhdestvensky (1866-1934), Russian bishop
- Robert Rozhdestvensky (1932–1994), Soviet/Russian poet
- Valery Rozhdestvensky (1939–2011), Soviet cosmonaut
- Vsevolod Rozhdestvensky (1895–1977), Russian/Soviet poet
- Yuri Rozhdestvensky (1926–1999), Soviet linguist
- Zhanna Rozhdestvenskaya, Soviet and Russian pop singer
- Zoya Rozhdestvenskaya (1906–1953), Soviet singer

== See also ==
- Zinovy Rozhestvensky (1848–1909), Russian admiral
