= Shirvani Chalaev =

Russian composer

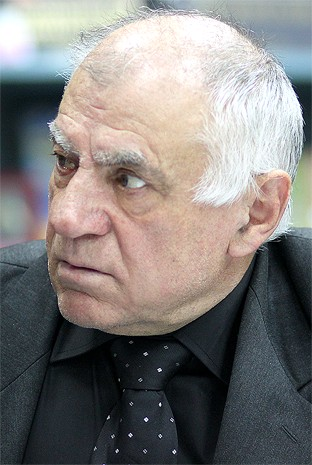
Shirvani Chalaev

Shirvani Ramazanovich Chalaev (Ширвани Рамазанович Чалаев; born 16 November 1936 in Dagestan) is a Dagestani composer.

His 1971 opera, The Highlanders, was the first Dagestan opera. He has composed children's operas for the Natalya Sats Children's Musical Theatre.

== Works ==
- The Highlanders ("Горцы")
- Mowgli
- King Lear
- Blood wedding
- Hadji Murat after Tolstoy's novel ("Хаджи-Мурат")

== Selected recordings ==
- Chalaev - Kontsert No. 1, 2, Lunnye Pesni - Valentin Feigin (cello), Moscow Symphony Orchestra Fuat Mansurov
