= Yauzsky Boulevard =

Street in Tagansky District, Moscow, Russia

Coordinates: 55°45′09″N 37°38′48″E

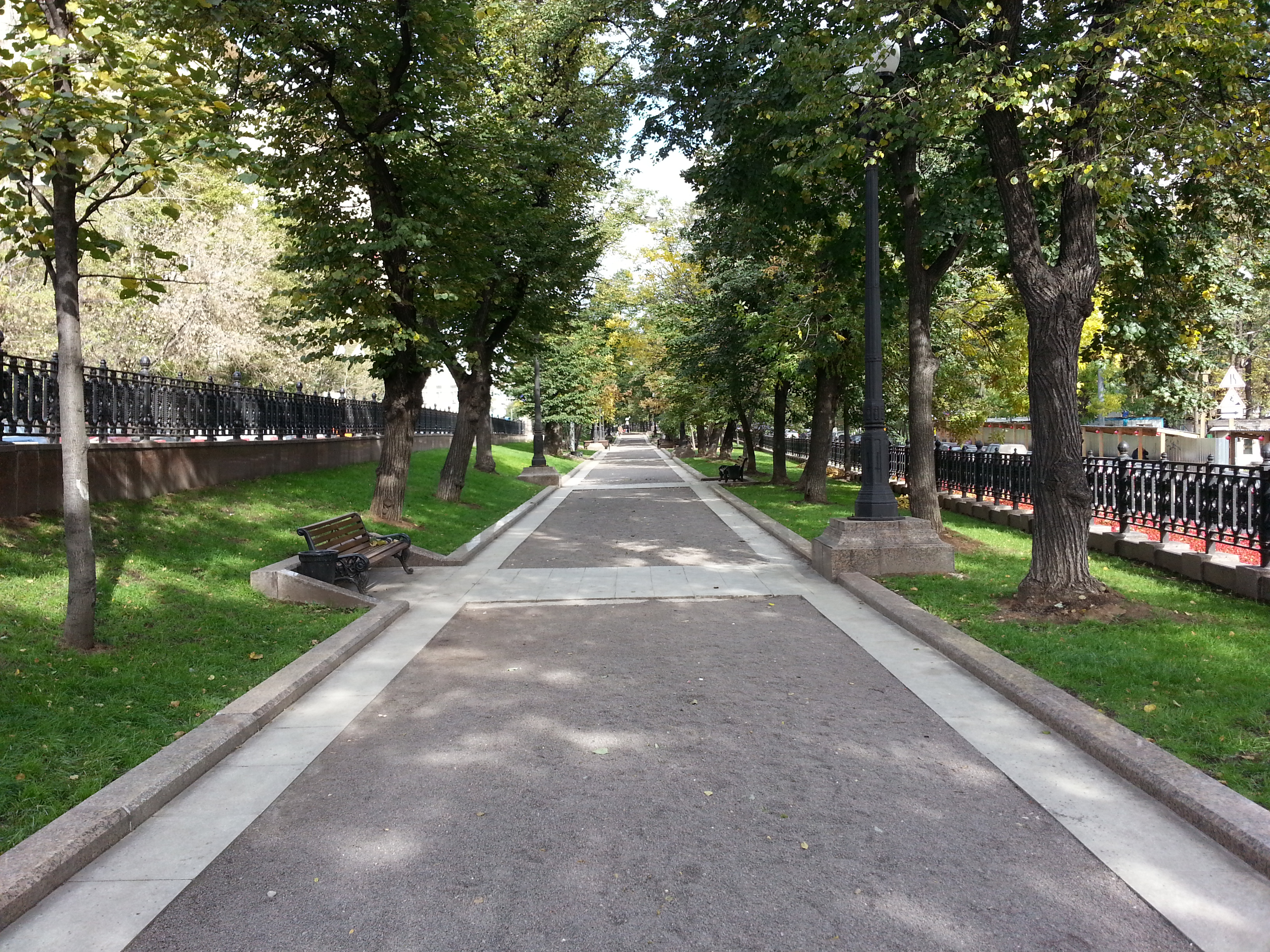

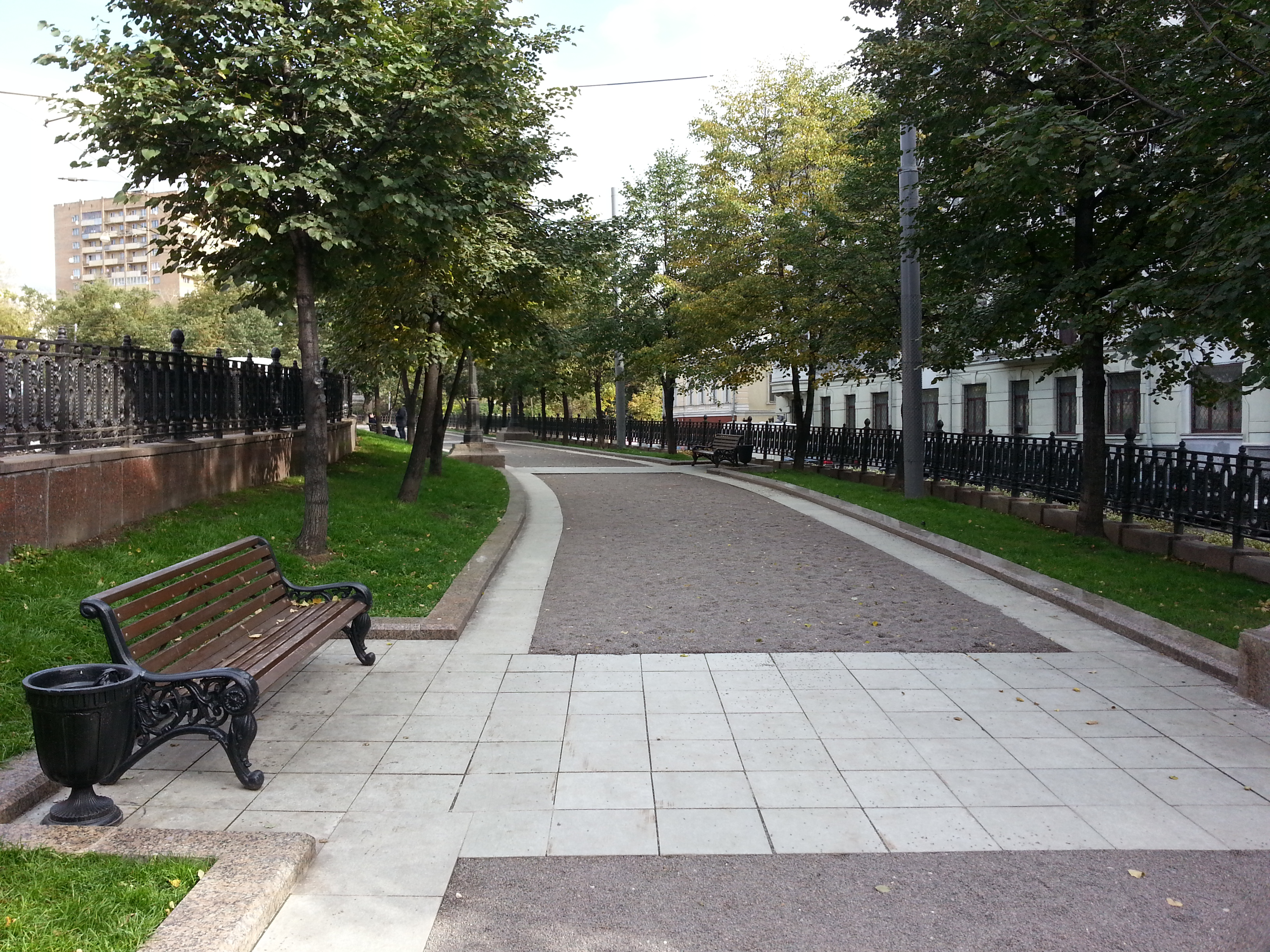

The Yauzsky Boulevard (Russian: Я́узский бульва́р) is a major boulevard in central Moscow. The boulevard runs from Vorontsovo Pole Street and Pokrovsky Boulevard down to Moskvoretskaya Embankment at the Yauza River, whence comes the name of the boulevard. It's the end of the important Boulevard Ring, an orbital ring filled with many boulevards.
