= Boulevard Ring =

Moscow's second centremost ring road

The Boulevard Ring (Russian: Бульва́рное кольцо́; transliteration: Bulvarnoye Koltso) is Moscow's second innermost ring road (the first is formed by the Central Squares of Moscow running along the former walls of Kitai-gorod). Boulevards form a semicircular chain along the western, northern and eastern sides of the historical White City of Moscow; in the south the incomplete ring is terminated by the embankments of Moskva River.

The first of the boulevards, Tverskoy Boulevard, emerged in 1796, but the ring was completely developed in 1820s, after the disastrous 1812 fire. The Ring replaced the medieval walls of the White City in the 1820s. The wall itself was raised in 1760, and despite the royal decrees to keep the site clear, the area was soon built over with private and state property. The Fire of Moscow destroyed many of those buildings, allowing the city planners to replace them with wide green boulevards.

In the 20th century, the width of the Boulevard Ring was expanded, as the formerly paved areas along the Pokrovsky Boulevard and Strastnoy Boulevard were planted with trees. Plans to complete the ring through Zamoskvorechye never materialized, however. These plans to properly terminate the ring through Yakimanka and Zamoskvorechye districts, proposed in 1935, periodically resurface in city planners' discussions.

== List of boulevards ==
Gogolevsky Boulevard	Nikitsky Boulevard	Tverskoy Boulevard	Strastnoy Boulevard
Petrovsky Boulevard			Rozhdestvensky Boulevard
Sretensky Boulevard	Chistoprudny Boulevard	Pokrovsky Boulevard	Yauzsky Boulevard

== See also ==
- Garden Ring in Moscow
- Third Ring Road in Moscow
- Moscow Ring Road in Moscow
