= Nikolay Dorizo =

Russian poet (1923–2011)

Nikolay Konstantinovich Dorizo (Russian: Николай Константинович Доризо; 22 October 1923 – 31 January 2011) was a Russian poet.

Dorizo was born in Krasnodar. His first poetry collection, On the native coasts, was published in 1948.

He was awarded the Order of the Badge of Honour and the Order of the Red Banner of Labour by the Soviet government. He died in Peredelkino. After his death, Russian Prime Minister Vladimir Putin sent a message of condolence to Dorizo's family.
