= Imperial Theatres =

Theatrical organization in the Russian Empire

Imperial Theatres of Russian Empire (Russian: Императорские театры Российской империи) was a theatrical organization financed by the Imperial exchequer and managed by a single directorate headed with a courtier director; was pertain to the Ministry of the Imperial Court from 1742.

The system operated in Russian Empire before the October Revolution along with numerous private particular and public theatres. It has integrated opera, ballet and drama companies in Saint Petersburg (the capital of the country at that time) and Moscow, two theatrical schools for raising of artistes and numerous buildings and opera houses in these cities.

== History ==
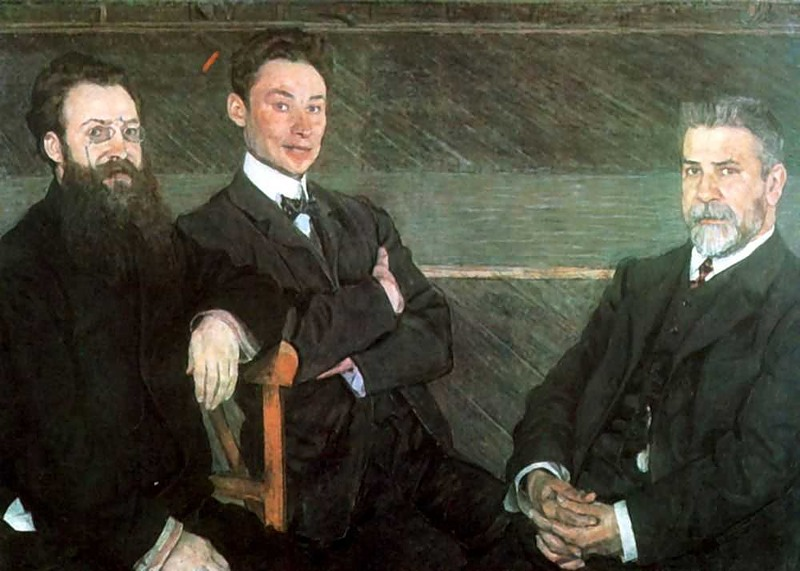
"Employees of the St Petersburg Imperial Theatres"; by Alexandr Golovin

In 1803 the system included Italian Opera of impresario Antonio Casassi and its Maly Theatre building (1801, replaced by Alexandrinsky Theatre in 1832).

In 1806 by a decree of Emperor Alexander I was established a division of Imperial Theatres in Moscow.

In 1809 under the Direction of Imperial Theatres there were seven different theatre companies (ballet, 2 of a Russian theatre, 3 of a French theatre and 1 of a German drama theatre) and at least 10 theatre buildings in Moscow, Saint Petersburg and its surroundings.

In 1905 there were six public Imperial Theatres in Russia (Alexandrinsky, Mariinsky, Mikhailovsky and Maly in Saint Petersburg, Maly and Bolshoi in Moscow) plus court Hermitage Theatre and Krasnoselsky Theatre used during the summer.

== Theatre buildings ==
=== In Saint Petersburg ===
- Hermitage Theatre

Was built in 1783—1787 by architect Giacomo Quarenghi for Empress Catherine II on the base of the Old Winter Palace of Peter the Great. Attended by members of Imperial family, ambassadors, courtiers and other officials, it was not open to the public.

- Bolshoi Theatre (Kamenny Theatre).

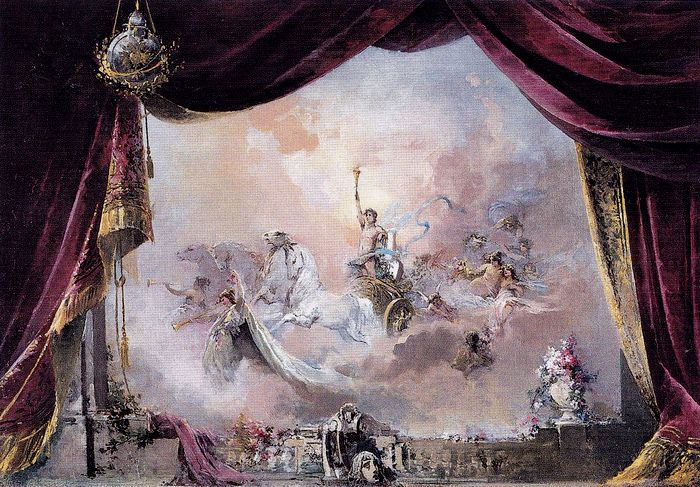
The curtain for the ballet La Perle (1896)

The Stone Theatre, was built in 1775—1783; initial project by Antonio Rinaldi was finished by other architects. In 1802—1805 it was rebuilt by Thomas de Thomon and renamed the Bolshoi (big one) to distinguish from Maly (small one). Burned down in 1811, then being restored and open in 1818 (Thomon died in 1813 after an accidental fall from the scaffolding of the theatre). Was enlarged in 1835—1836 from three up to five circles by architect Alberto Cavos. Before 1860 was used both for opera and ballet performances; from 1860 when Mariinsky Theatre was built just opposite of it, was used mostly for ballets. In 1886 building was transmitted to the Russian Musical Society; in 1896 it was completely rebuilt by architect Vladimir Nicholas for dispose the Saint Petersburg Conservatory.

- Maly Theatre

The Small Theatre was built in 1801 by architect Vincenzo Brenna for Italian impresario Antonio Casassi and his Italian Opera. In 1803 it was included into the system of Imperial Theatres. In 1828–1832 on its place instead of old wooden opera house Alexandrinsky Theatre was built.

- Alexandrinsky Theatre

Was built in 1828—1832 by architect Carlo Rossi to replace 1801 Maly Theatre building by Vincenzo Brenna. Named after the wife of Nicholas I Empress Alexandra Feodorovna. Was used for drama performances of a Russian theatre.

- Mikhailovsky Theatre

Was built in 1833 by architects Alexander Brullov and Aleksey Gornostayev, reconstructed in 1859 by Alberto Cavos. Named after the younger brother of Nicholas I Grand Duke Michael Pavlovich. Was used for drama and musical performances of a French theatre, held guest performers from abroad and some opera stagings.

- Krasnoselsky Theatre

Wooden theatre in Krasnoye Selo 30 kilometers away from Saint Petersburg, summer military capital of the Russian Empire at that time. Was built in 1851 by architect Alberto Cavos. Used for summer performances attended by Imperial Guard and members of Imperial family.

- Mariinsky Theatre

Was built in 1859—1860 by Alberto Cavos to replace private Equestrian Circus Theatre built in 1847—1848 by the same architect opposite the Bolshoi Theatre and burnt down on January 26, 1859. Named after the wife of Alexander II Empress Maria Alexandrovna. Was used for opera performances; after the 1883—1886 reconstruction (architect Victor Schröter supervised by Nicholas Benois) also held ballet performances.

=== In Moscow ===
Imperial Theatres in Moscow were organized in 1806 by a decree of Emperor Alexander I.

- Arbatsky Theatre

The New Imperial (Arbat) Theatre was built in 1807—1808 by order of Alexander I by architect Carlo Rossi, open on April 13th 1808. Situated on Arbatskaya Square it was one of the first large buildings in Moscow that has been burnt down during the 1812 fire.

- Maly Theatre
- Novy Theatre

The New Imperial Theatre organized in 1898 by Aleksandr Lensky for young actors' performances was functioned till 1907. The building of Shelaputin's Theatre on Theatre Square (next to the Bolshoi and opposite the Maly theatre) was rented for it.

== Theatre schools ==
All children accepted to the Imperial Theatre schools were taken for full state maintenance, lived at the boarding school and could not be excluded from institution until the end of the studies. They were trained firstly for a career in ballet (as most difficult to achieve), then in drama and music. The least gifted were switched to training as props makers, theatrical operators etc.

After the October Revolution both of the schools were divided according to the type of training. Now these are Vaganova Academy of Russian Ballet and Russian State Institute of Performing Arts in Saint Petersburg and Moscow State Academy of Choreography and Mikhail Shchepkin Higher Theatre School in Moscow.

=== In Moscow ===
Moscow theatre school was organized in Moscow Orphanage in 1773 by decree of Empress Catherine II. From 1784 it was managed by private Petrovsky Theatre which in 1789 became the property of the Moscow Orphanage's Guardianship Council. The school became part of the state imperial system in 1806, when Moscow division of Imperial Theatres was organized. In the 1820s Moscow theatre school was situated at Bludov's house (Povarskaya Street 13, now Supreme Court of Russia). After 1830 the school along with Moscow Direction of Imperial theatres moved into the Tolstoy's house (Kuznetsky Most 1, now Russian State Library of Arts). In 1863 school moved into the 1822 building by architect Joseph Bové situated next to the Maly Theatre (Neglinnaya Street 6/2, now Mikhail Shchepkin Higher Theatre School; Bolshoi Ballet School has stayed at the same building till 1968).
