= Neglinnaya =

Neglinnaya, in Moscow, Russia, refers to:

- Neglinnaya River, currently locked into a tunnel
- Neglinnaya Street, built in 1820s over this tunnel; the boundary between Tverskoy District and Meshchansky District
- toponym for Central Bank of Russia, headquartered on Neglinnaya Street
