= Dmitry Ukhtomsky =

Russian architect (1719–1774)

Dmitry Vasilyevich Ukhtomsky
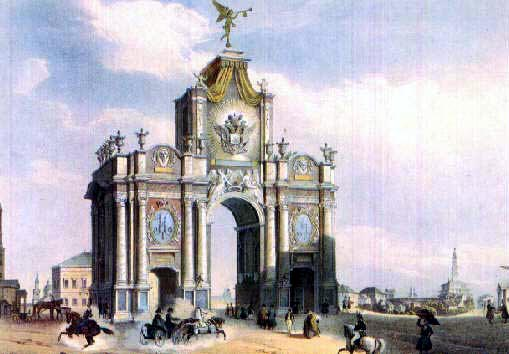
- Red Gates in the 1840s
- Born: 1719; Semyonovskoye, Poshekhonsky District of Yaroslavl Oblast
- Died: October 15, 1774 (aged 54–55); Own estate in Odoyevsky District of Tula Oblast
- Occupation: Architect
- Buildings: Red Gates; Church of Martyr Nikita in Basmanny District

Prince Dmitry Vasilyevich Ukhtomsky (Russian: Дмитрий Васильевич Ухтомский; 1719–1774) was the chief architect of Moscow, Russian Empire during the reign of Empress Elizabeth of Russia.

== Biography ==
Ukhtomsky was born in a village to the north of the city Yaroslavl, where his Rurikid ancestors used to be rulers. At the age of 12, he moved to Moscow and studied there at the School of Mathematics and Navigation until 1733. He studied architecture and worked at Ivan Michurin's workshop until 1741, later working for Ivan Korobov (1741–1743). In 1742, Korobov supported Ukhtomsky's nomination for his first professional title and delegated him the management of a firm. In 1744, Ukhtomsky acquired a full architect's license and the rank of captain in state hierarchy.

Ukhtomsky's first public successes were the temporary pavilions and arched for the coronation of Empress Elisabeth I of Russia in 1742. In 1753-1757 he rebuild one of these arched into landmark Red Gates, which stood until 1927. Since the 1740s, he built numerous buildings in nearby Basmanny District, notably the extant Church of Martyr Nikita, the largest mature Baroque building in Moscow.

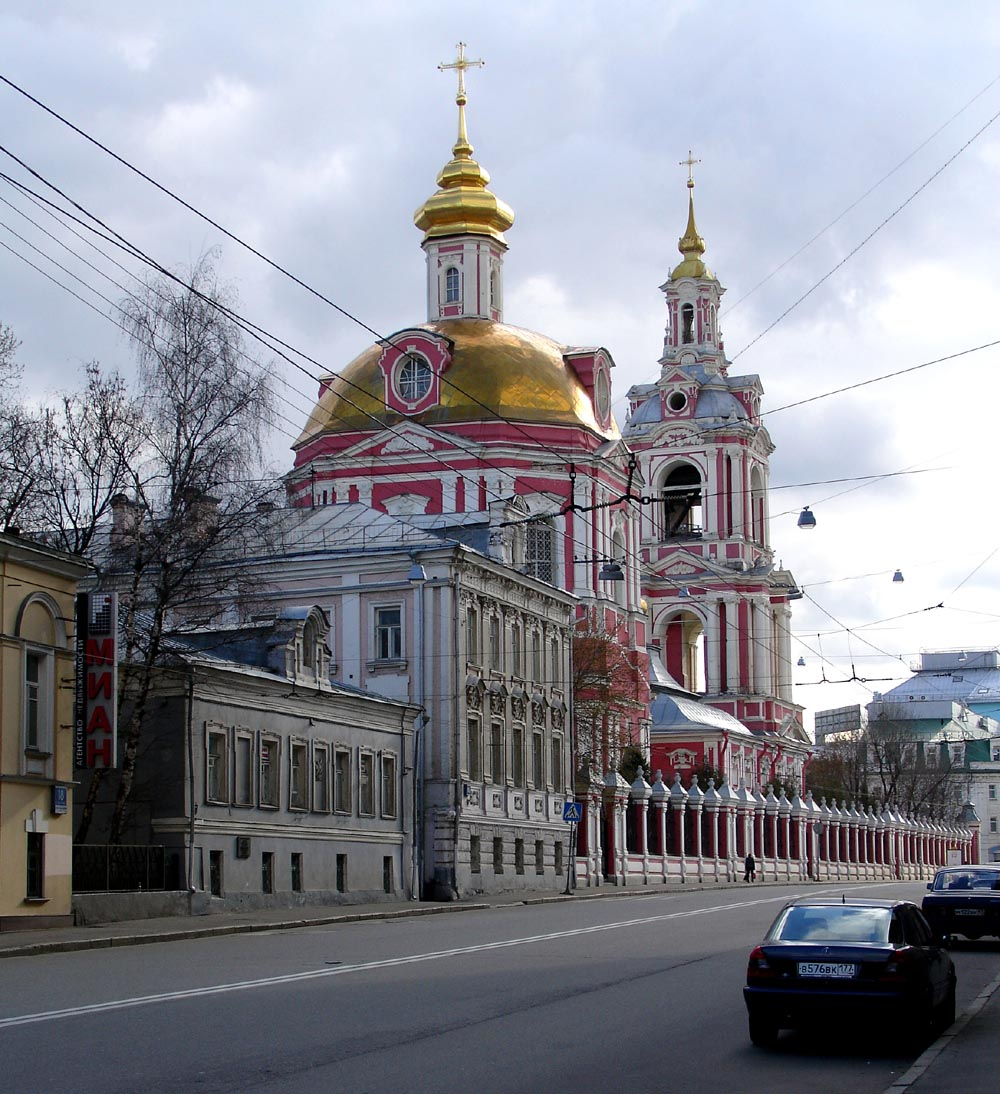
Church of Martyr Nikita, one of the few extant buildings by Ukhtomsky

The grand bell-tower of the Troitse-Sergiyeva Lavra, 81 meters tall, was one of several projects where Ukhtomsky worked first with his mentor Michurin, and then independently until 1760. Present-day Kuznetsky Most, literally Blacksmith's Bridge, stands on the site of a 120-meter-long (390 ft) bridge over Neglinnaya River, also designed by Ukhtomsky. The bridge, the palace in German Quarter and many other buildings by Ukhtomsky were destroyed by accidental fires, rebuilt beyond recognition or demolished.

For the first time in history of Moscow, Ukhtomsky produced master plans for redevelopment of areas destroyed by the fires of 1748 and 1752. Ukhtomsky also supervised repairs in Moscow Kremlin in the 1750s. He trained and influenced Matvei Kazakov, Ivan Starov, Alexander Kokorinov, and other noted masters who graduated from the architectural school founded by Ukhtomsky in Moscow in 1749.

In 1760, Ukhtomsky was accused of fraud and dismissed from his job; his school was closed in 1764. In 1767 he left Moscow forever; despite a 1770 verdict in his favor, he never returned to practical construction and education.

== Works ==
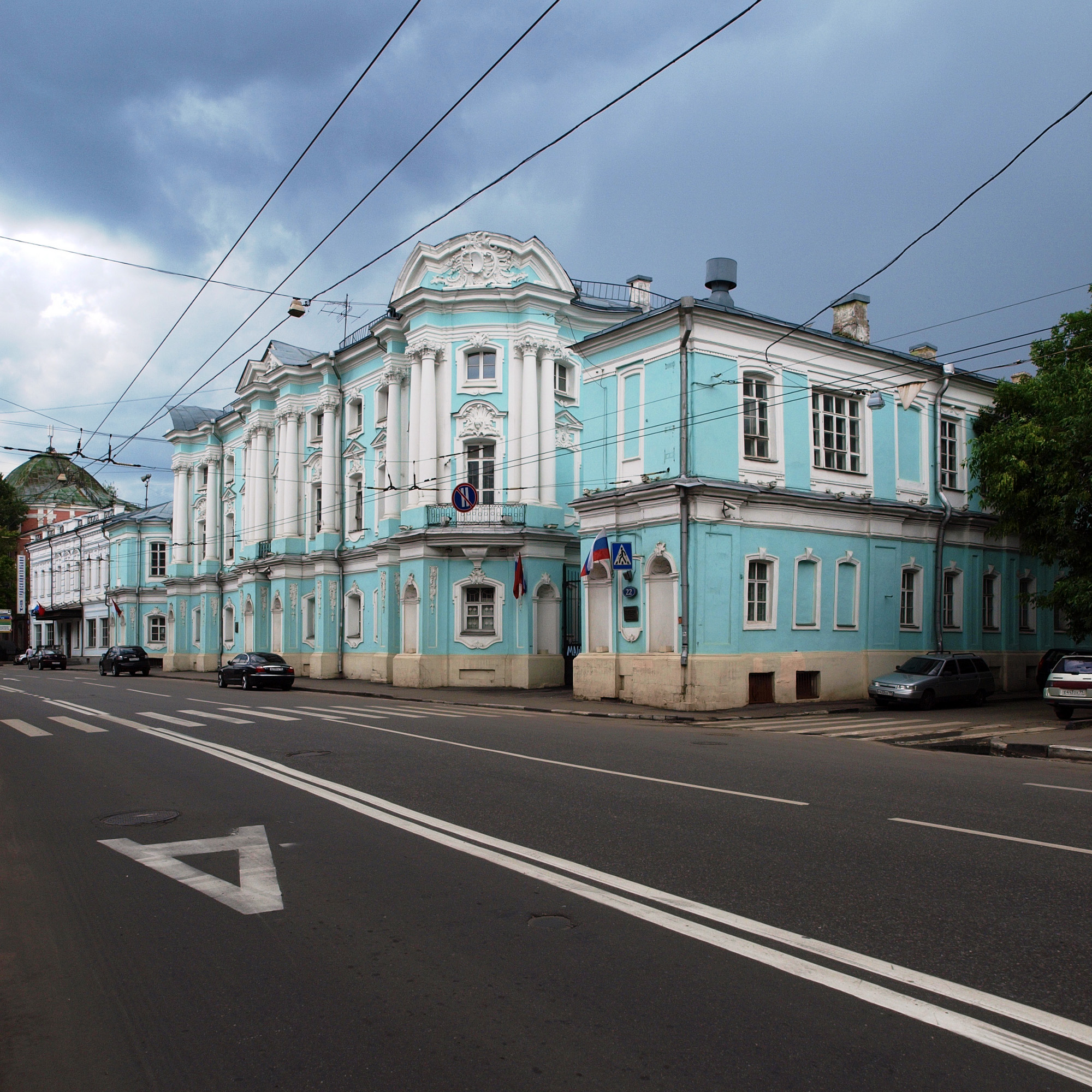
The Apraksin-Trubetskoy palace, 2009

=== Moscow ===
- Church of Martyr Nikita, 1745–1751, Staraya Basmannaya, 16
- City estate of Count Alexey Petrovich Bestuzhev-Ryumin, 2-ya Baumanskaya st., 5 (rebuilt)
- Church of St. Sergius of Radonezh in Krapivniki, 1749–1750, Krapivenskiy lane, 4
- gatehouse church for St Pachomius at Vysokopetrovsky Monastery, 1750–1755, Petrovka st., 28/3
- city estate of the Dolgorukovs, 1751–1758, Kolpachny lane, 6 (rebuilt)
- Church of St. Nicholas in Zayaitskom, 1741–1759, 2 Raushsky lane, 1
- Apraksin-Trubetskoy palace, 1752–1769, Pokrovka st., 22/1
- the Red Gate, 1753—1757
- the Fanagorian Barracks, 1753–1757, Baumanskaya st., 61
- restoration and reconstruction of the Kremlin Arsenal, 1754—1759
- the bell tower and the refectory in St Clement's Church, 1756–1758.

=== Other Cities ===
- Khutyn Monastery belfry, 1758—1761

== Sources ==
- Russian: "Архитектор Д.В. Ухтомский, 1719-1774: Каталог", М., Стройиздат, 1973
- Murzin-Gundorov, V. V. (2012). Дмитрий Ухтомский [Dmitry Ukhtomsky] (in Russian). Moscow: Rudentsov Publishing House. pp. 147–155. ISBN 978-5-902887-11-9.
- Mikhailov, Alexei I. (1954). Архитектор Д. В. Ухтомский и его школа [Architect Dmitry Ukhtomsky and His School]. Мастера русской архитектуры (in Russian). Moscow: Gosstroiizdat.
