= Petrovka Street =

Street in Moscow, Russia

Coordinates: 55°45′58″N 37°36′56″E

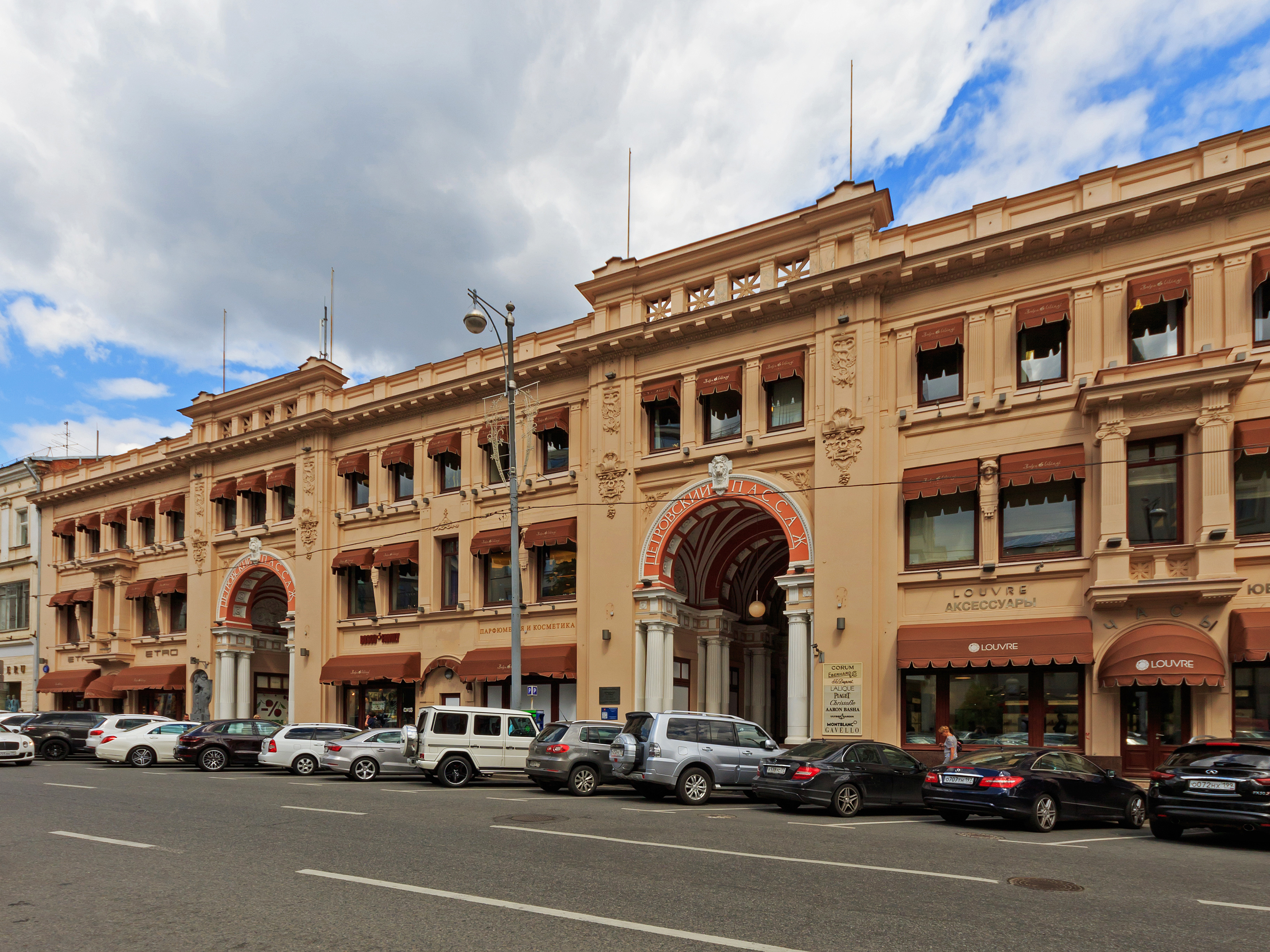
- Petrovsky Passage
- Native name: Петровка (Russian)
- Length: 1.2 km (0.75 mi)
- Location: Moscow; Central Administrative Okrug; Tverskoy District
- Postal code: 125009, 107031, 127051, 127006
- Nearest metro station: Lubyanka; Okhotny Ryad; Teatralnaya; Ploshchad Revolyutsii; Kuznetsky Most; Pushkinskaya; Chekhovskaya; Tsvetnoy Bulvar

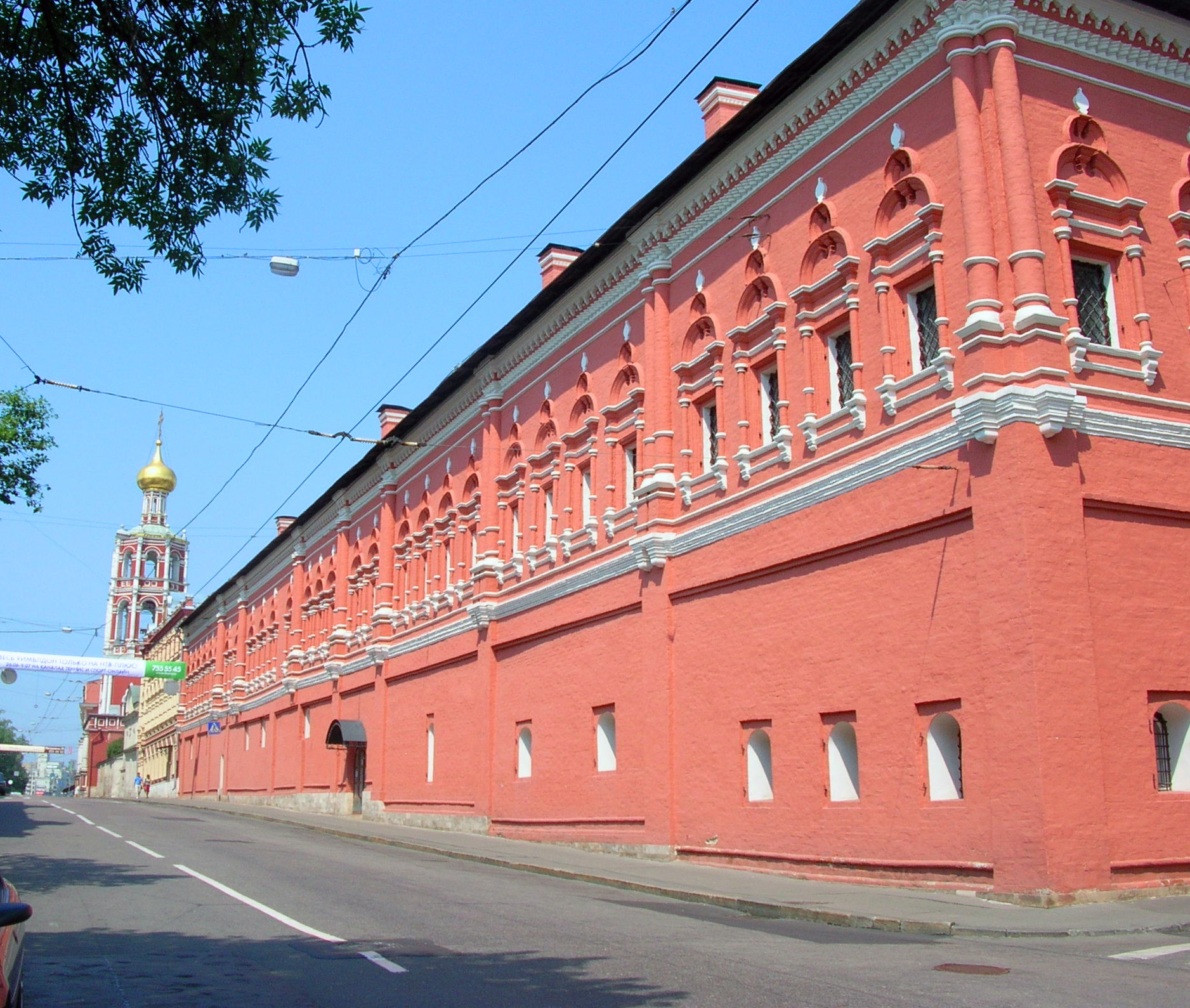
Vysokopetrovsky Monastery

Petrovka Street (Russian: Улица Петровка, romanized: Ulitsa Petrovka) is a street in Moscow, Russia, that runs north from Kuznetsky Most and Theatral Square up past Strastnoy Boulevard and Petrovsky Boulevard.

The street takes its name from the St. Peter's Monastery, situated at the top of the hill, at the intersection of the street and the Boulevard Ring. The street is a home to upscale shops, offices, and night clubs, such as the historic Petrovka Passazh and TsUM. Perhaps the most famous building is the Moscow Criminal Police (Petrovka, 38). The Petrovka Theatre, built in 1780 at the intersection of Petrovka and Okhotny Ryad, has been known as the Bolshoi Theatre since 1824.

The street ends just before the Garden Ring, where the Hermitage Garden is located.

The nearest metro station is Teatralnaya, located on the Zamoskvoretskaya Line.

== See also ==
- The Girl from Petrovka
- Muir & Mirrielees
