= Theatre Square (Moscow) =

Square in Moscow, Russia

Teatralnaya Square
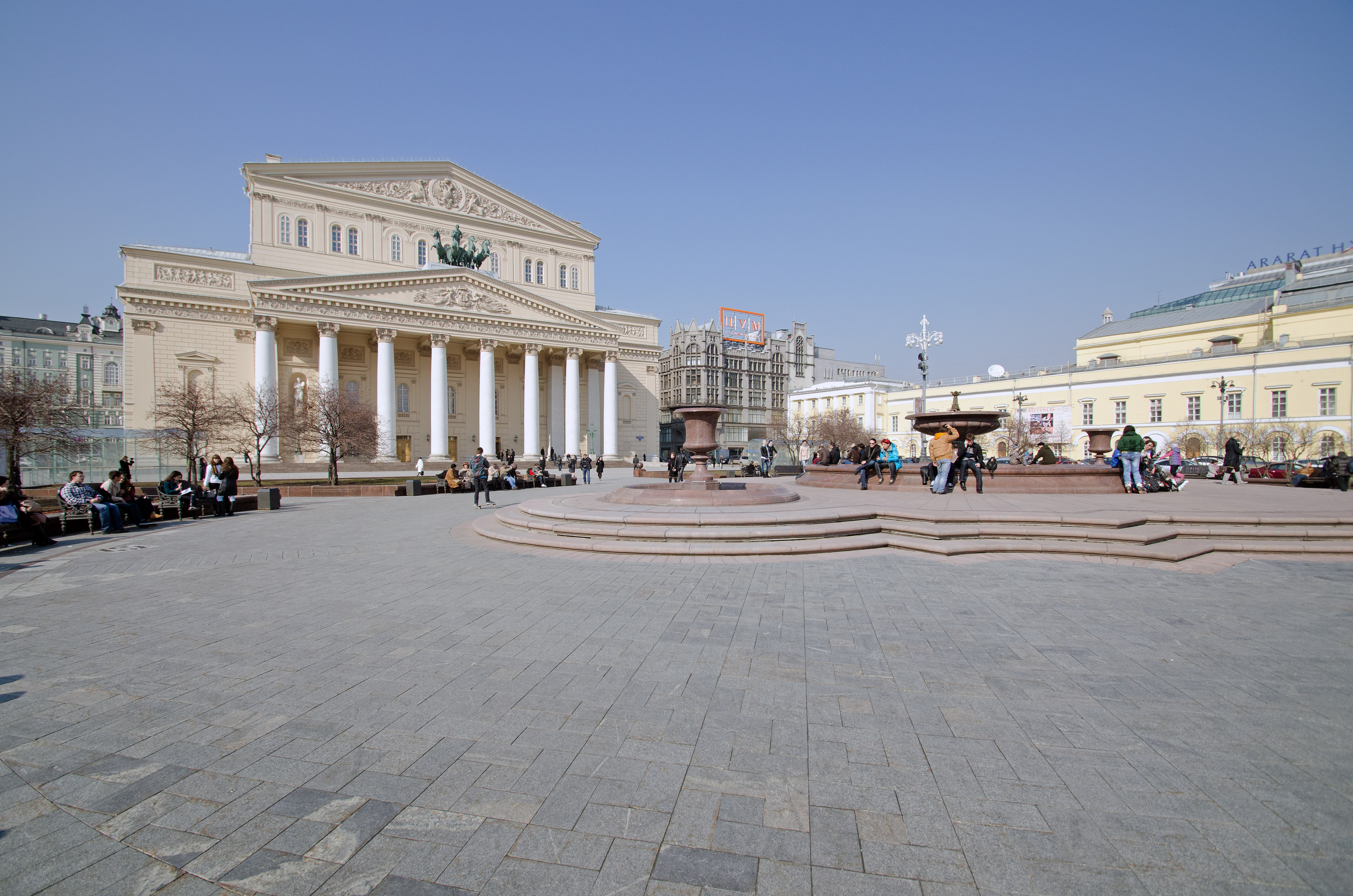
- Interactive map of Teatralnaya Square
- Native name: Театральная площадь (Russian)
- Location: Moscow; Central Administrative Okrug; Tverskoy District
- Nearest metro station: Okhotny Ryad; Teatralnaya; Ploshchad Revolyutsii
- Coordinates: 55°45′33″N 37°37′8″E

Theatre Square or Teatralnaya Square (Russian: Театральная площадь, Teatralnaya ploshchad), known as Sverdlov Square between 1919 and 1991, is a city square in the Tverskoy District of central Moscow, Russia. It is at the junction of Kuznetsky Bridge Street, Petrovka Street, and Theatre Drive (north-west of the latter; the square south-east of Theatre Drive is the separate Revolution Square).

The square is named after the three theatres located on it: the Bolshoi Theatre, Maly Theatre, and Russian Academic Youth Theatre.

The square is served by the Moscow metro at the Teatralnaya station on the Zamoskvoretskaya Line; Okhotny Ryad station on the Sokolnicheskaya Line; and Ploshchad Revolyutsii station on the Arbatsko-Pokrovskaya Line.

== History ==
The square emerged after the 1812 Fire of Moscow and conversion of the Neglinnaya River into an underground channel. The river still flows diagonally under the square's park. It was designed in a symmetrical Neoclassical style by Joseph Bove in the 1820s, with Neoclassical Style buildings framing it. However, in the second half of the 19th century the Neoclassical ensemble was destroyed by new buildings in eclectic styles, that were considerably taller than the original ones fronting the square. The square also has the Gothic Revival style TsUM (ЦУМ) luxury department store building.

It was during a meeting in then Sverdlov Square on 5 May 1920, that an iconic picture of Lenin was taken.

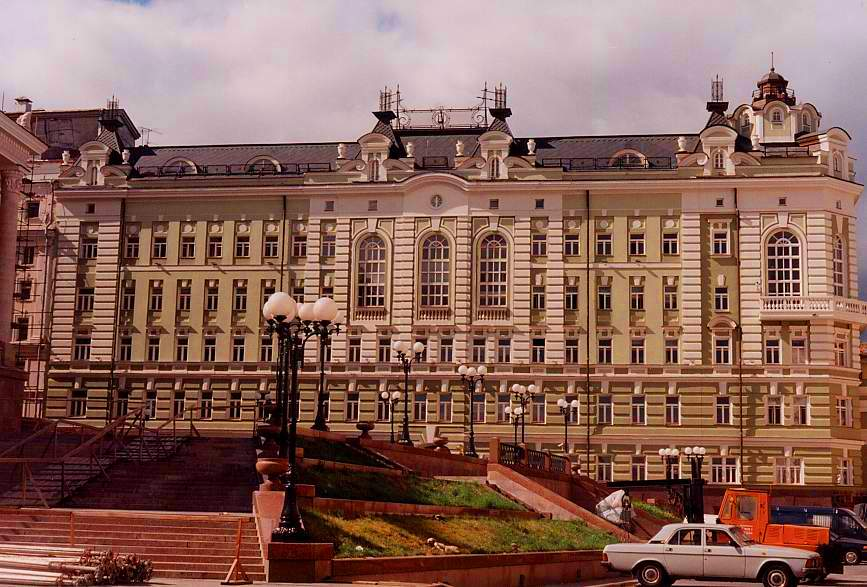
Teatralnaya Ploshchad, 2001

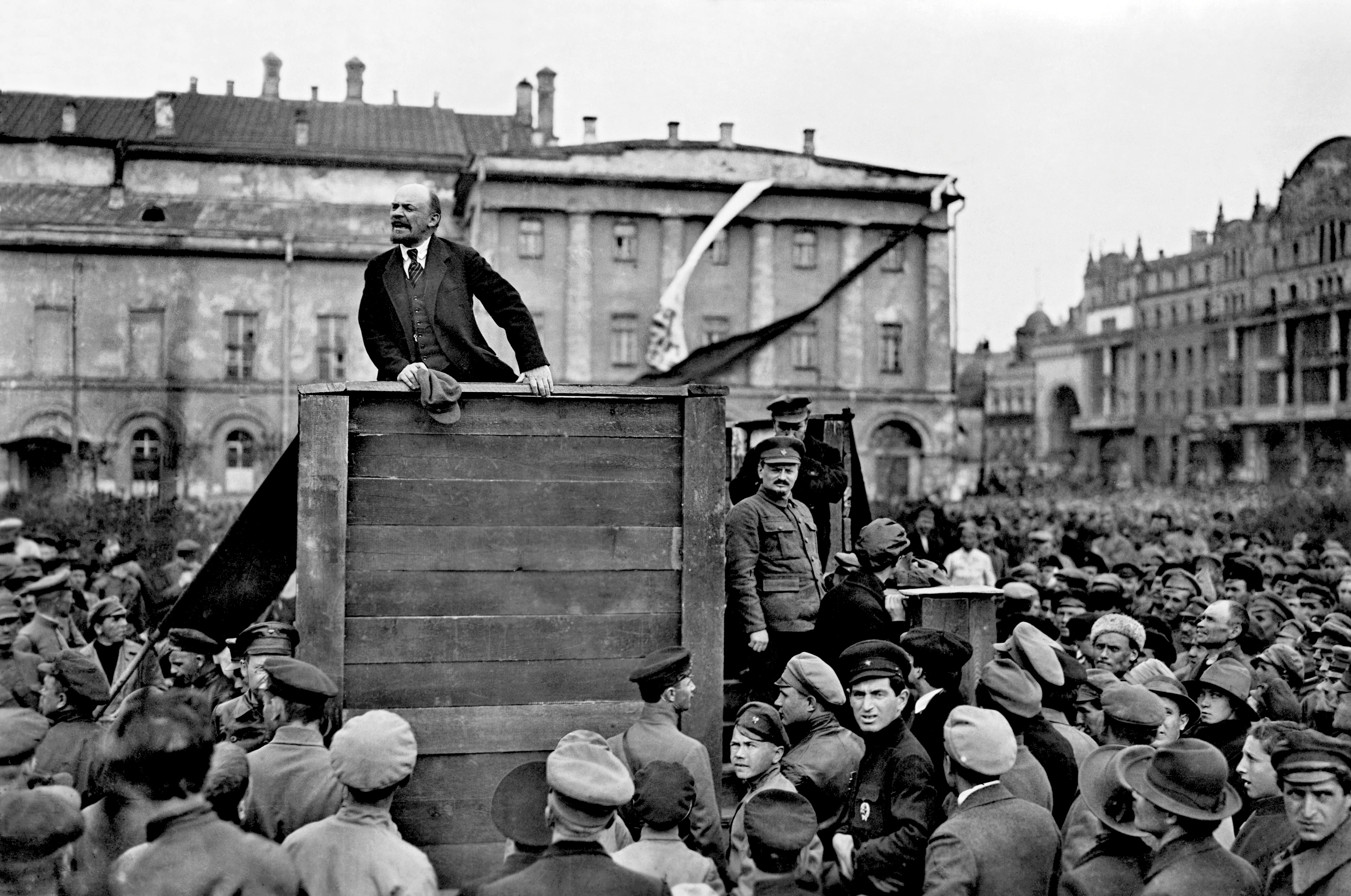
The iconic photo of Lenin giving a speech at the square, May 1920

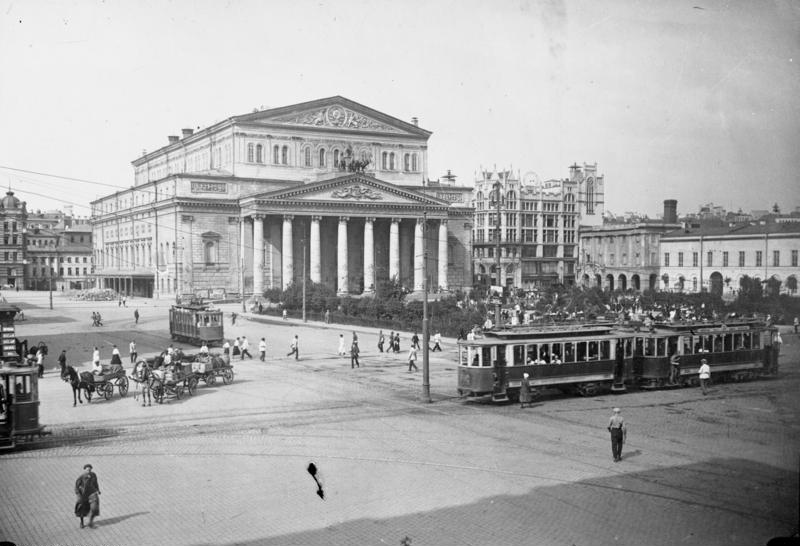
Sverdlov Square (Theatre Square) in 1932.

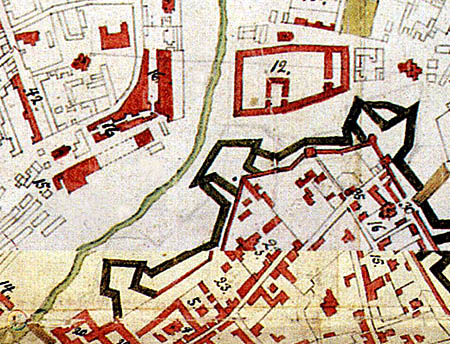
Site of the future square in the 1760s, showing the Neglinnaya River and the bastions of the Kitai-gorod

== Bibliography ==
- Moscow Encyclopaedia. Bolshaya Rossiiskaya Entsikolpediya, 1997. Article "Teatralnaya ploshchad".
