= Kuznetsky Most =

Street in Moscow, Russia

Coordinates: 55°45′42″N 37°37′12″E

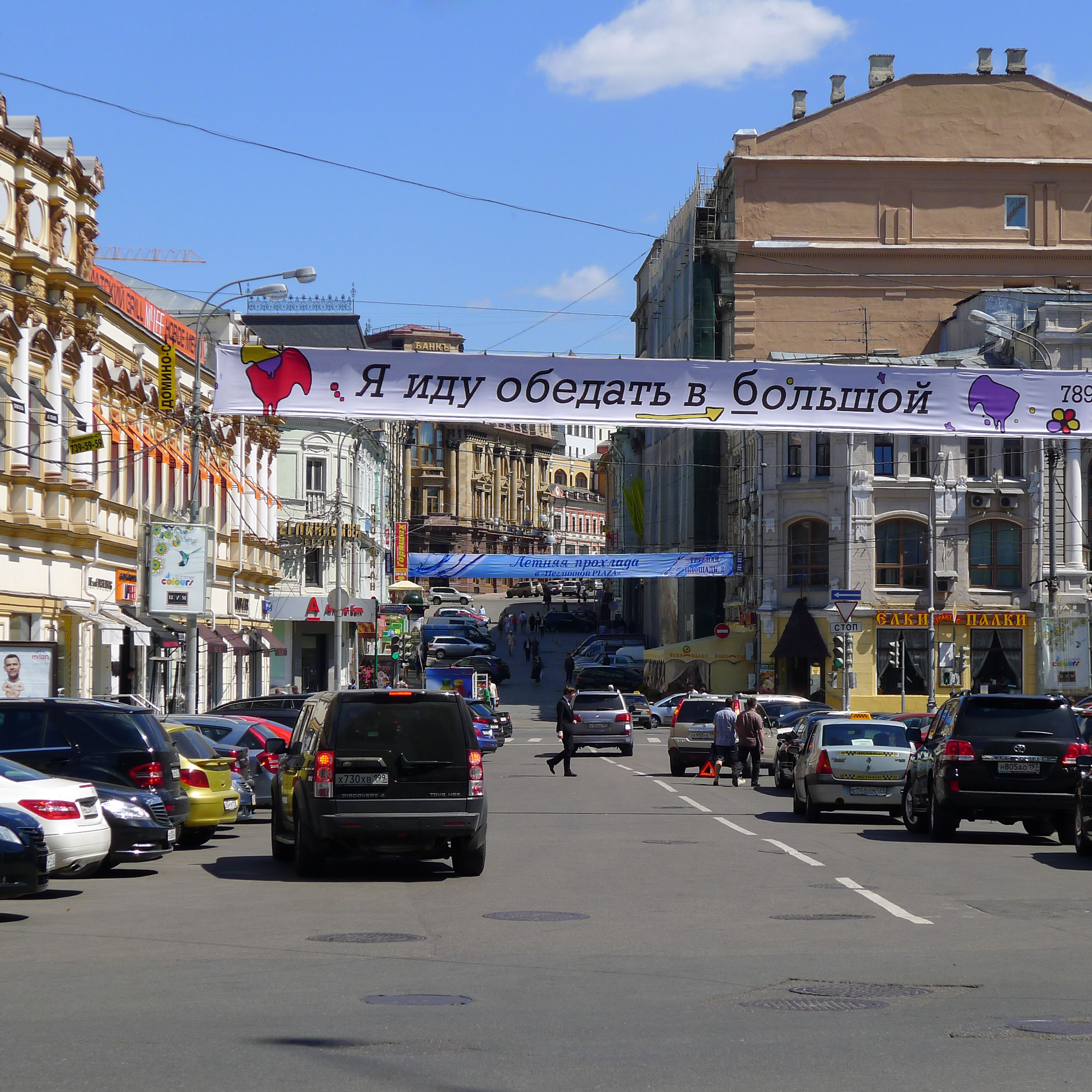
- Kuznetsky Most from Petrovka Street
- Interactive map of Kuznetsky Most
- Native name: Кузнецкий Мост (Russian)
- Location: Moscow; Central Administrative Okrug; Meshchansky District; Tverskoy District
- Postal code: 125009, 107031
- Nearest metro station: Okhotny Ryad; Teatralnaya; Kuznetsky Most; Lubyanka

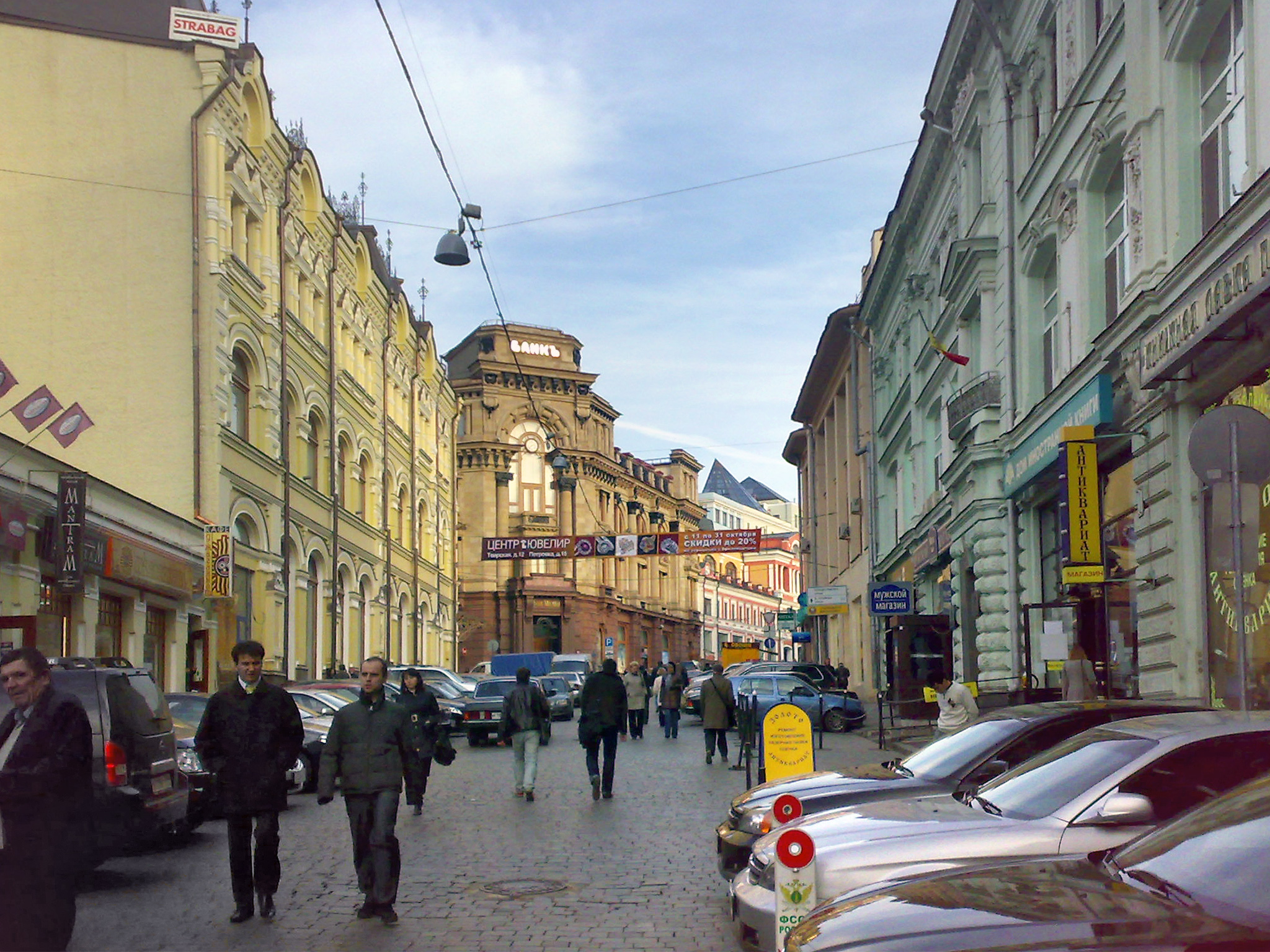
Looking up Kuznetsky Most Street from the crossing with Neglinnaya Street

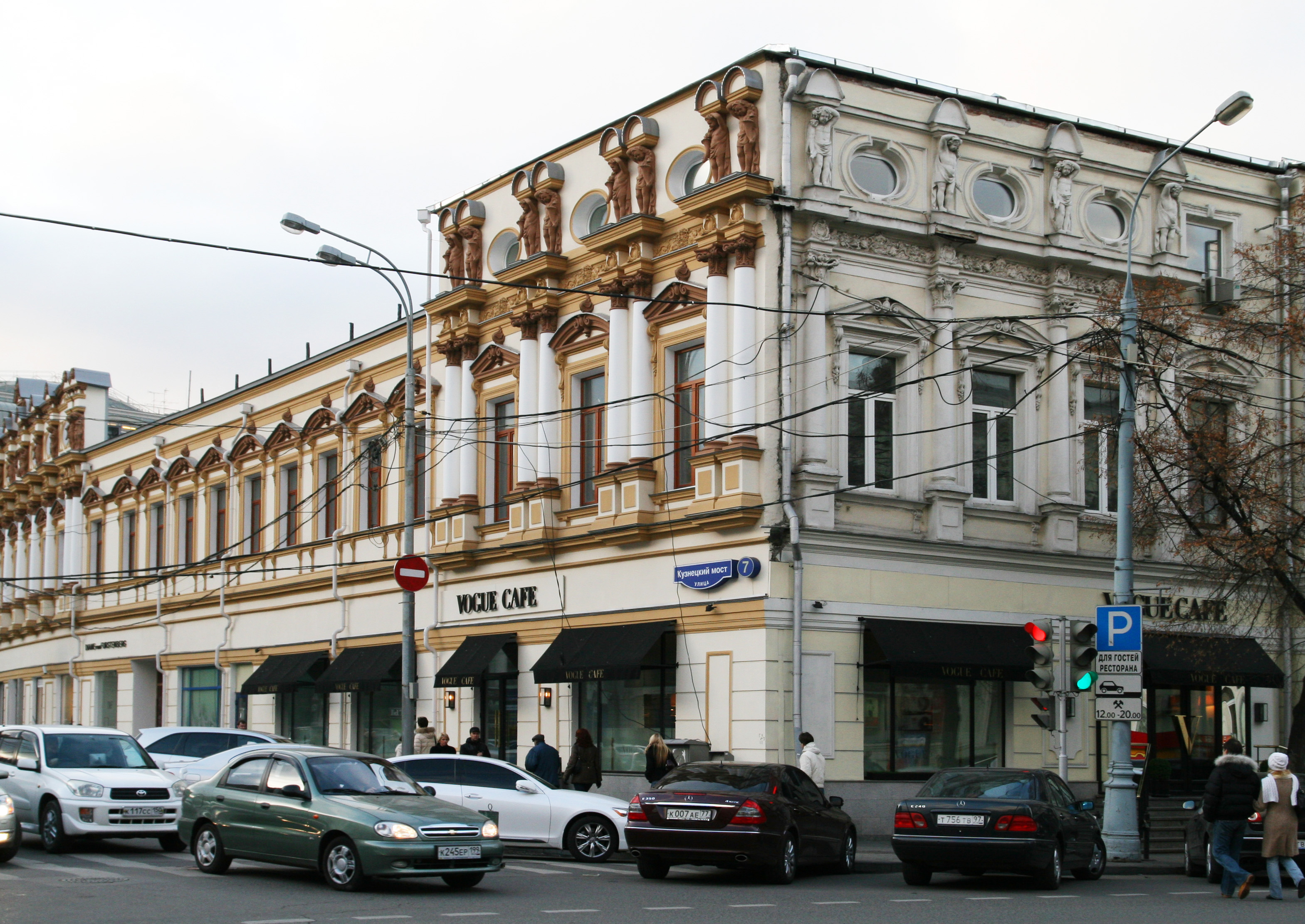
Partially renovated building on the corner of Kuznetsky Most Street and Neglinnaya Street

Kuznetsky Most (Russian: Кузне́цкий Мост, IPA: [kʊˈzʲnʲet͡skʲɪj ˈmost]) is a street in central Moscow, that runs from Bolshaya Dmitrovka Street to Lubyanka Street. The name, literally Blacksmith's Bridge, refers to the 18th-century bridge over the (now underground) Neglinnaya River, and a nearby foundry and the settlement of its workers. The street is administered by Tverskoy District (west) and Meshchansky District (east).

== History ==
=== Early history ===
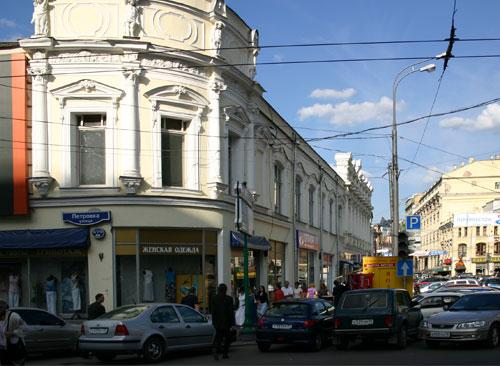
The corner of Kuznetsky Most Street and Petrovka Street. Until 1922, the street ended here; its westward extension was known as Kuznetsky Lane

Until the end of 15th century, Moscow was growing eastward, into Kitai-gorod. Prince Ivan III of Russia established his arsenal (Пушечный двор, Cannon Court) in the west, beyond the Neglinnaya river. Later, he also set up a settlement of former Pskov residents, abducted from their hometown after the wars of the 1480s. Population grew slowly until the 1737 fire which razed the area.

=== The Bridge ===
Soon after the fire, the territory was built out. Large territories north from the street were consolidated by the Vorontsov family estate. In 1754-57, architect Semyon Yakovlev built a stone bridge over Neglinnaya River to a design by Dmitry Ukhtomsky. The bridge over Neglinnaya lowlands extended 120 meters long and 12 meters wide; the shops between Kuznetsky Bridge and Vorontsov lands were literally standing on the edge of this bridge. The street was known as the home of notorious Darya Saltykova (1730-1801), condemned to life in prison for torturing her slaves.

=== 19th century ===
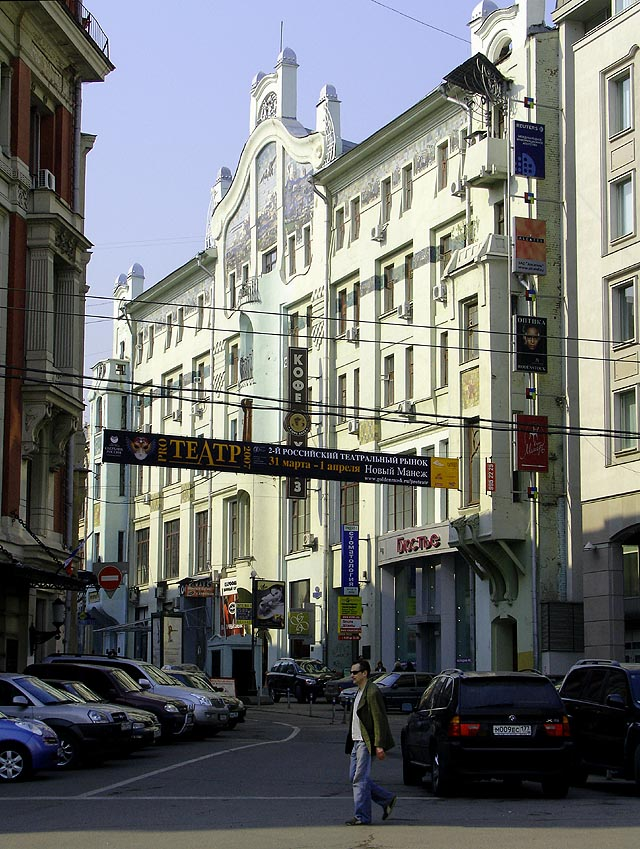
Sokol Building, 2007 photo

The Fire of Moscow (1812) spared Kuznetsky Most, where Napoleon's Guards were stationed in defense of the French colony in Moscow. In 1817-1819, the city locked the Neglinnaya River in a tunnel and demolished the redundant bridge - excluding its northern wall that supported surviving buildings. Kuznetsky Most became the symbol of French influence on Russians, immortalized in Woe from Wit by Alexandr Griboyedov.

After Emancipation reform of 1861, Kuznetsky Most became the financial center of Moscow, with historical Juncker Bank Building and Dzhamgarov Bank built in the 1890s. Art Nouveau landmark by Ivan Mashkov, the Sokol building (3, Kuznetsky Most) was built in 1903–1904. However, at that time its address was Kuznetsky Lane: the part of Kuznetsky Most west of Petrovka Street was then known as Kuznetsky Lane; two streets were merged only in 1922.

=== Modern history ===
The Detsky Mir children's store

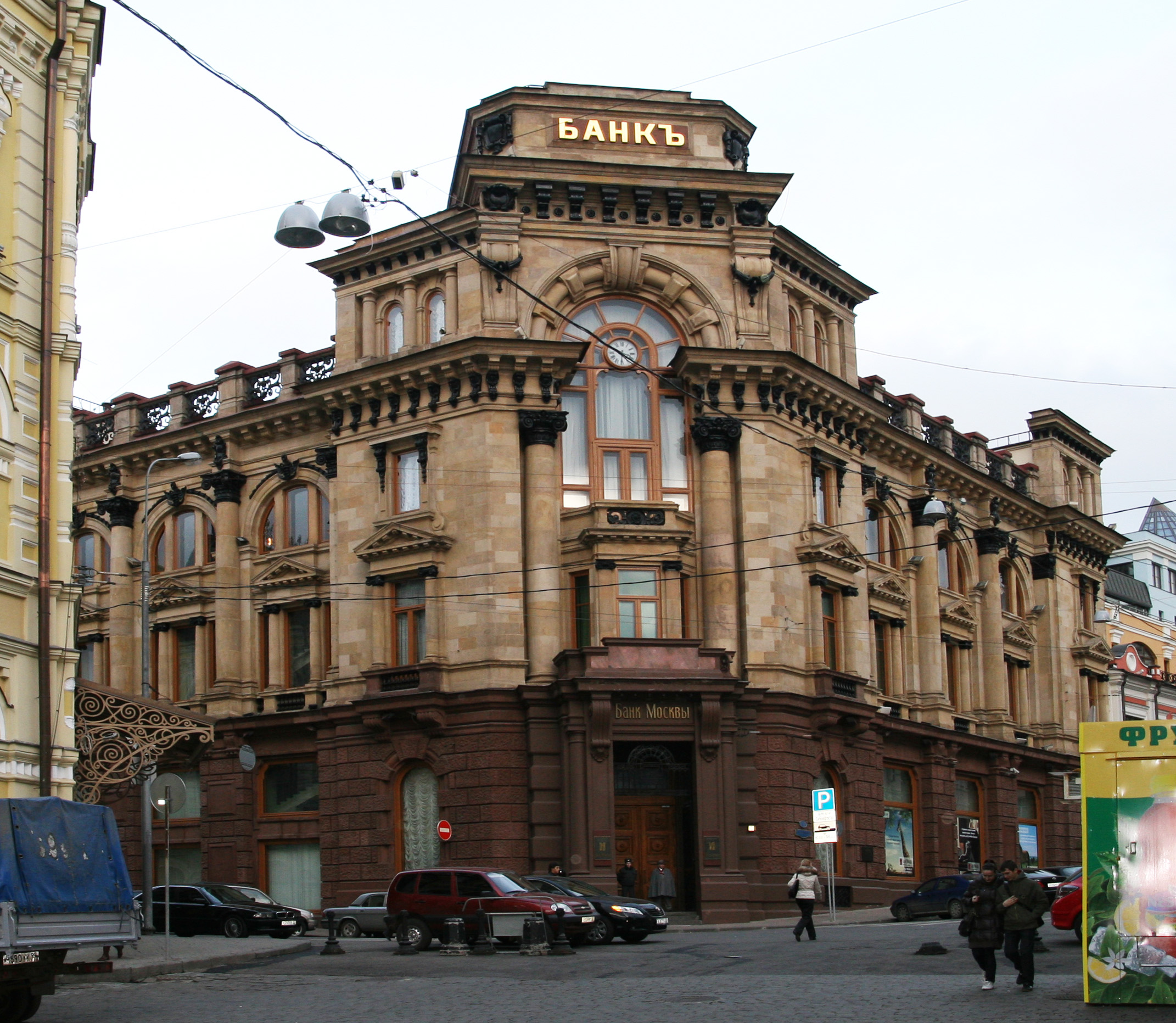
Moscow International Commercial Bank, 1890s

In the 1920s, the Bolshevik administration demolished the church on the corner of Kuznetsky Most and Lubyanka Street, creating Vorovsky Square. Nearby blocks were gradually converted to KGB offices after World War II; the blocks facing Lubyanka Square were torn down to make way for the Ministry of the Maritime Fleet and Alexey Dushkin's Detsky Mir department store. The latter was restored in 2014 and now hosts the world's largest mechanical clock, "Raketa Monumental". The famous Russian perfume "Kuznetsky Most", from the "Novaya Zarya" brand, is named after the street.

== Rapid transit ==
Kuznetsky Most, Lubyanka and Okhotny Ryad stations of the Moscow Metro are located nearby.

== Gallery ==
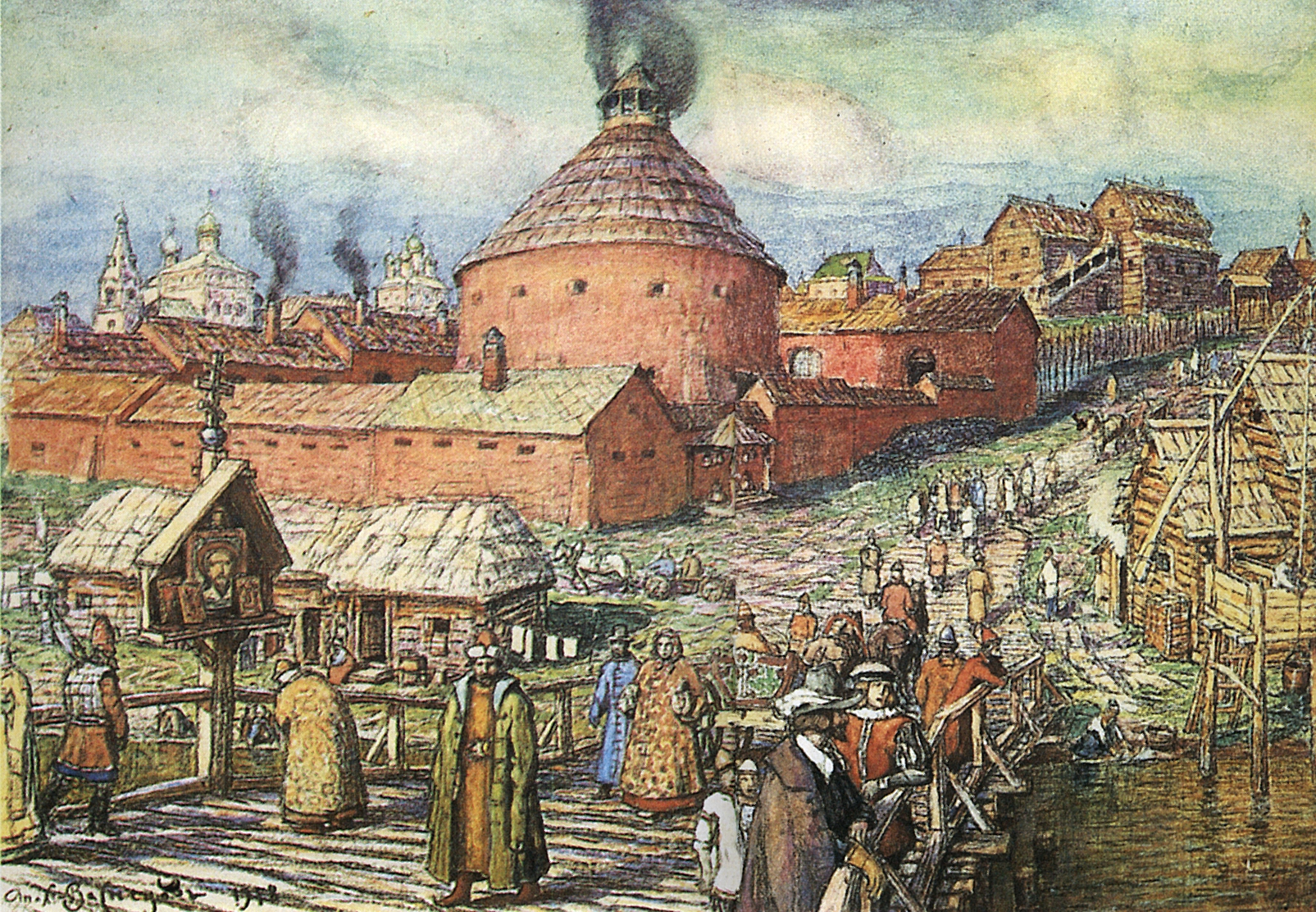
Kuznetsky Most and Cannon yard in the 16th century. Reconstruction by A. Vasnetsov

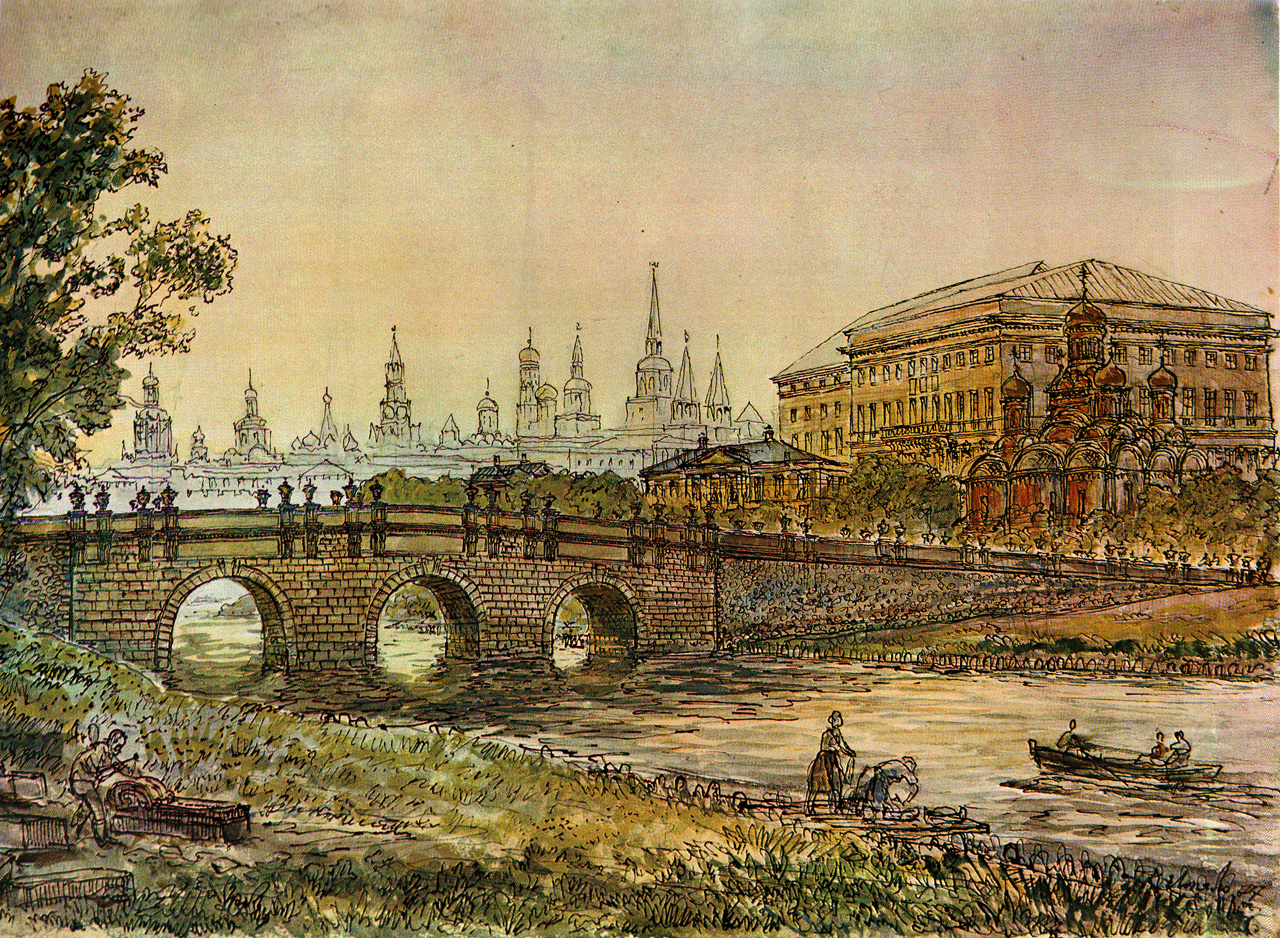
Kuznetsky Most in the 18th century.

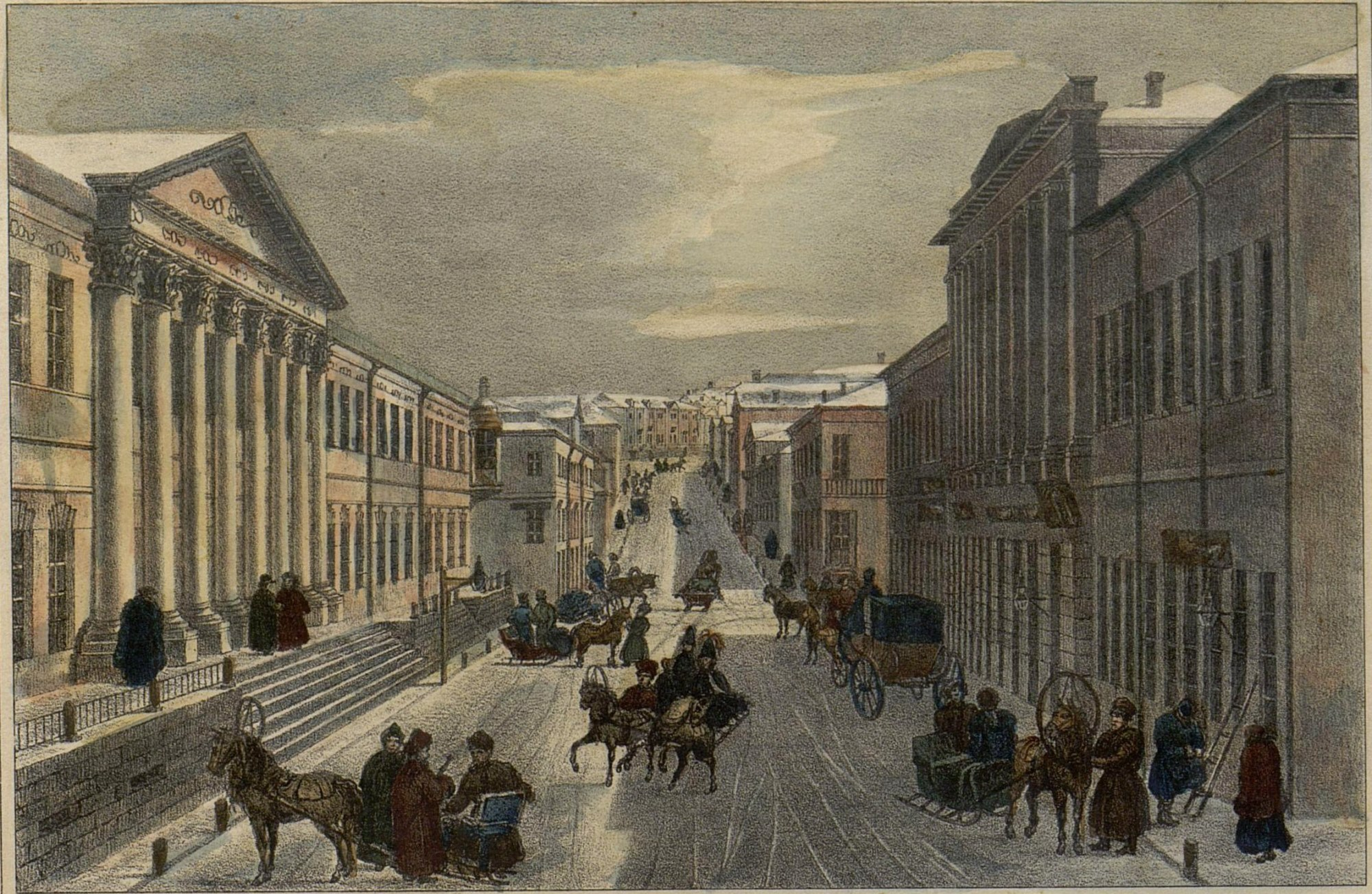
Kuznetsky Most in 1834

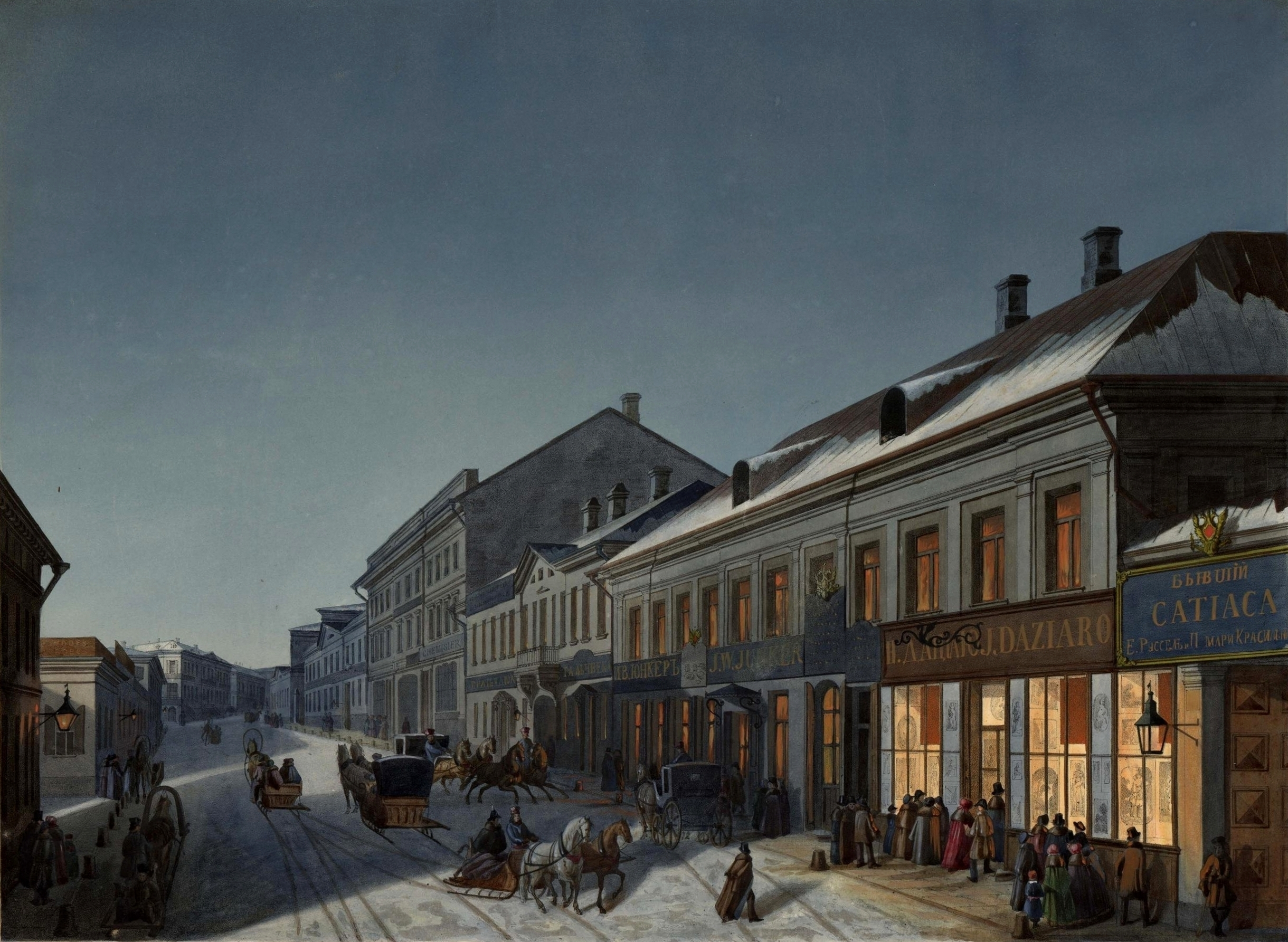
Kuznetsky Most in the middle of 19th century

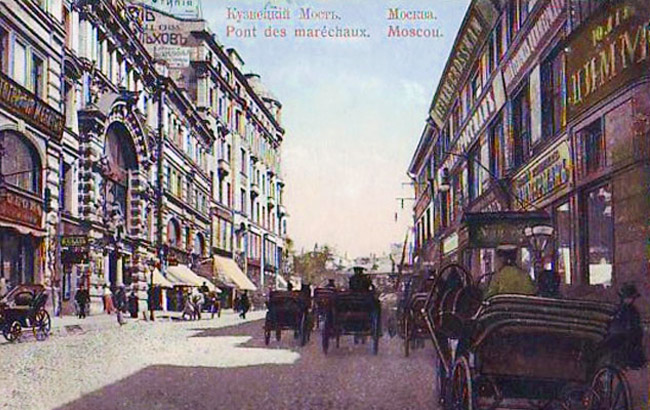
Kuznetsky Most, a view to side of the street Lubyanka, the end of the 19th century

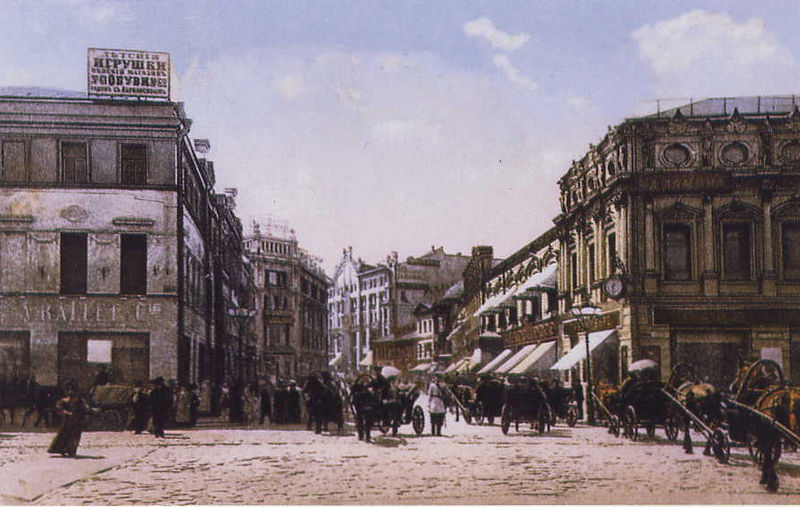
Kuznetsky Most. A view from the street Neglinnaya to side of the street Petrovka the end of the 19th century

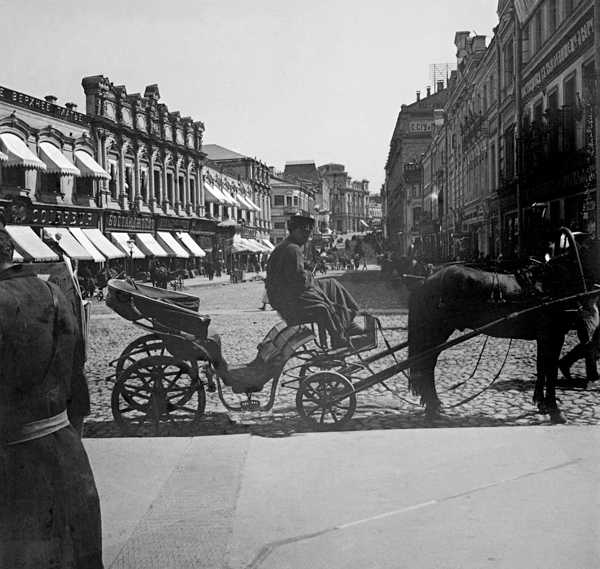
Kuznetsky Most. A view from the street Petrovka to side of the street Rozhdestvenka, 1912

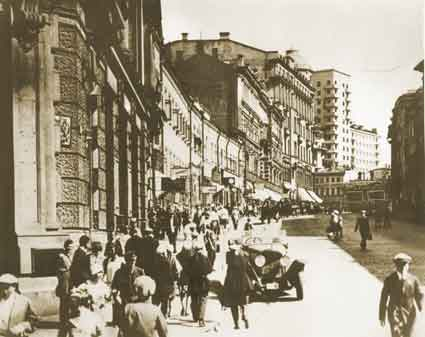
Kuznetsky Most. A view from the street Rozhdestvenka to side of the street Lubyanka, the beginning of the 1930s

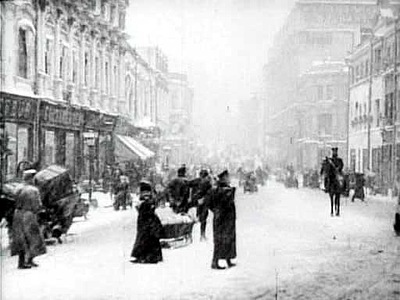
Kuznetsky Most in 1908

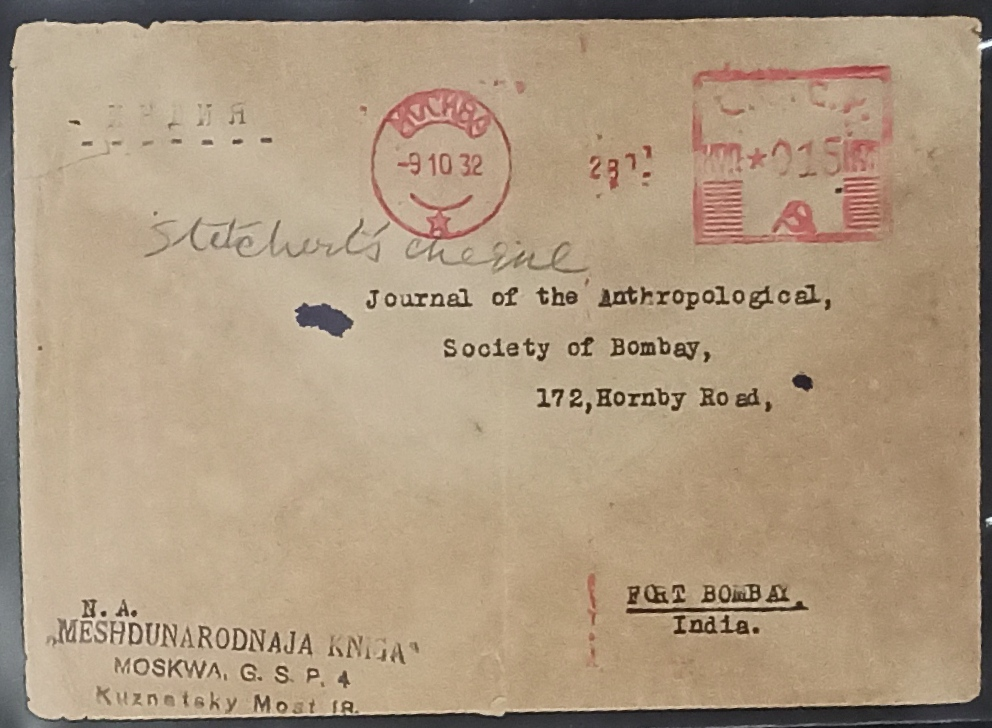
Letter by Mezhdunarodnaya Kniga (18, Kuznetsky Most) to Anthropological Society of Bombay, India, 1932.
