= Neglinnaya Street =

Street in Moscow, Russia

Coordinates: 55°45′50″N 37°37′12″E

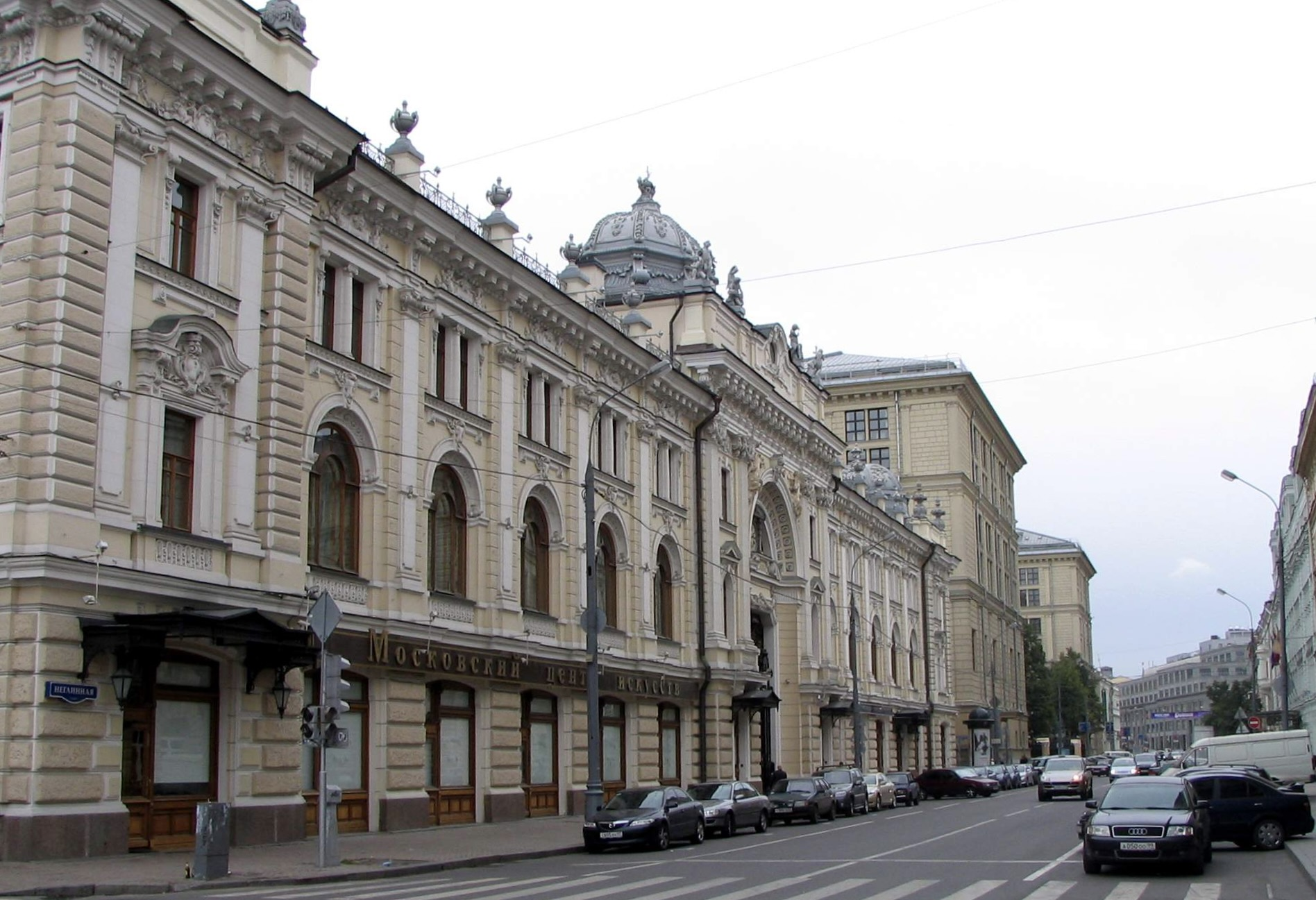
- Native name: Неглинная улица (Russian)
- Location: Moscow; Central Administrative Okrug; Meshchansky District; Tverskoy District
- Nearest metro station: Teatralnaya; Tsvetnoy Bulvar; Trubnaya

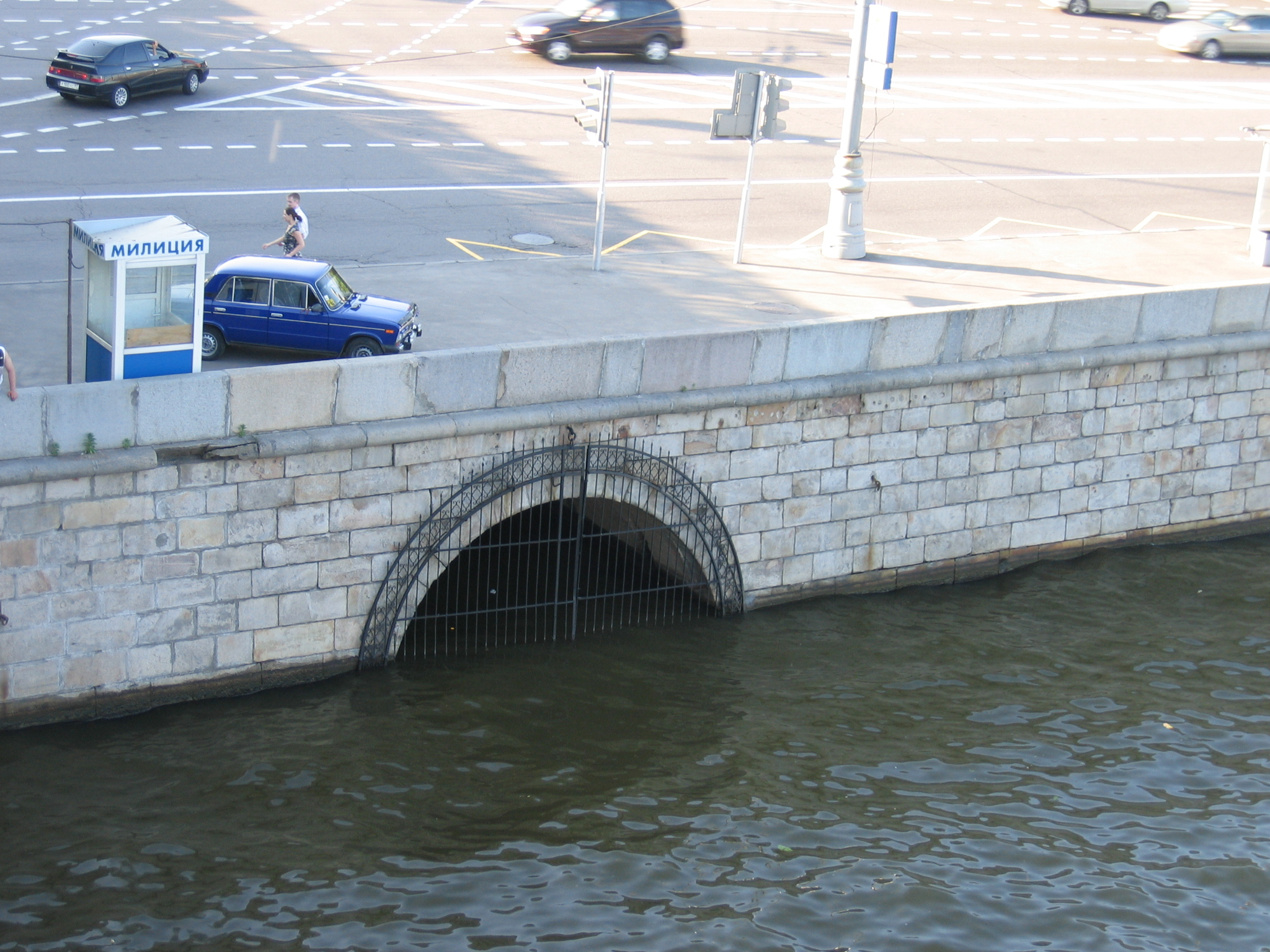
Neglinnaya River empties into the Moskva from a pipe

Neglinnaya Street (Russian: Неглинная улица) is a street inside the Garden Ring of Moscow, Russia. It runs from the Bolshoi Theatre to the Trubnaya Square. The street was paved over the underground Neglinnaya River in 1819. Throughout the 20th century the river regularly flooded the street and the adjacent quarter. The highlights of the Neglinnaya include the Muir & Mirrielees building, the Petrovka Passazh, the Sandunov Baths, and the Central Bank of the Russian Federation.

== Gallery ==
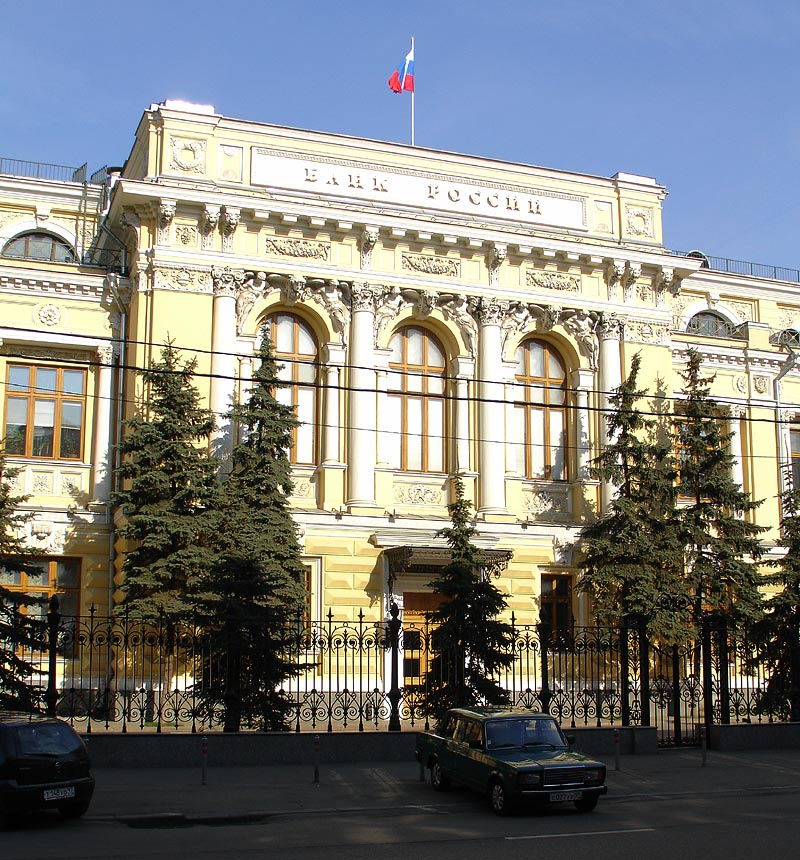

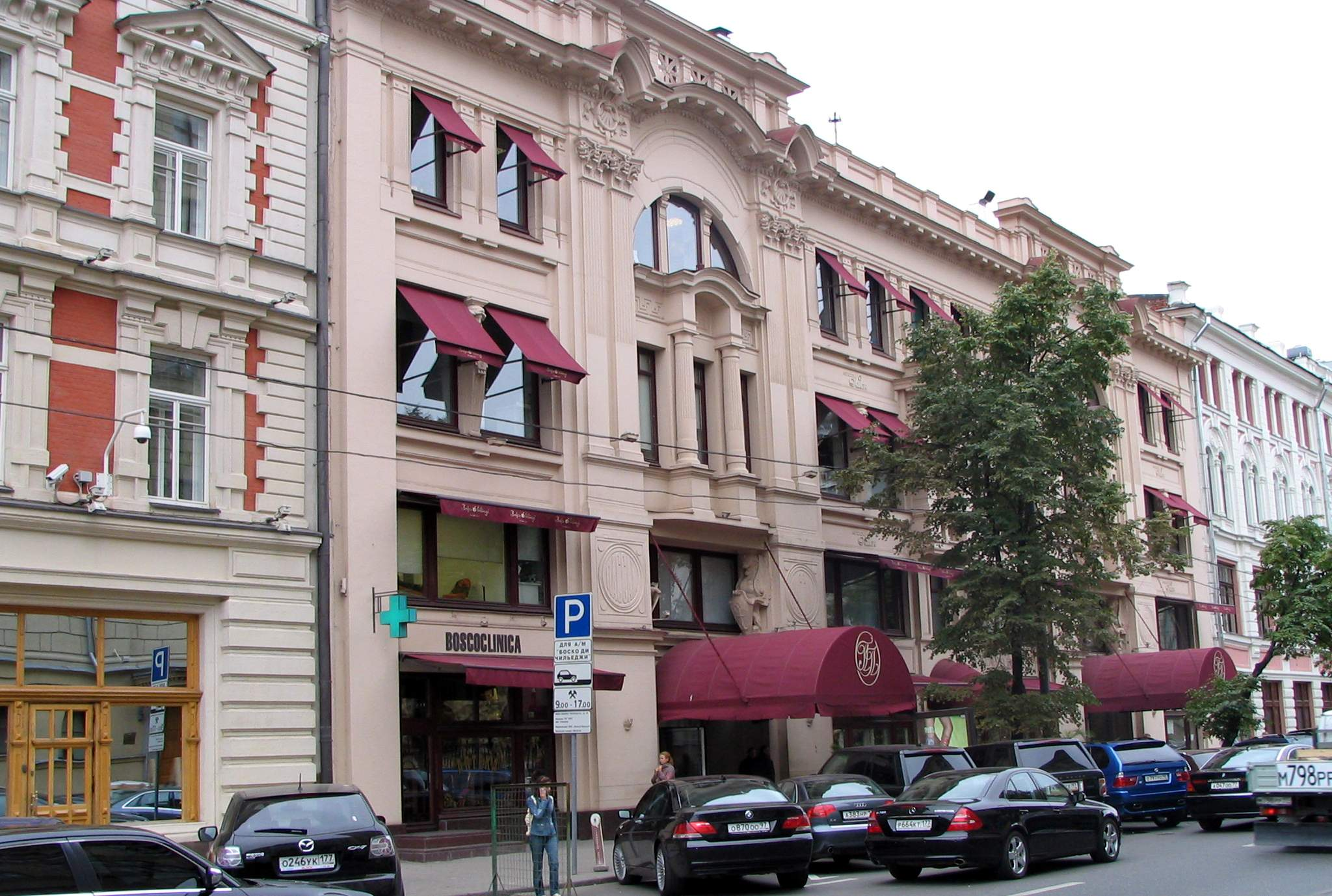

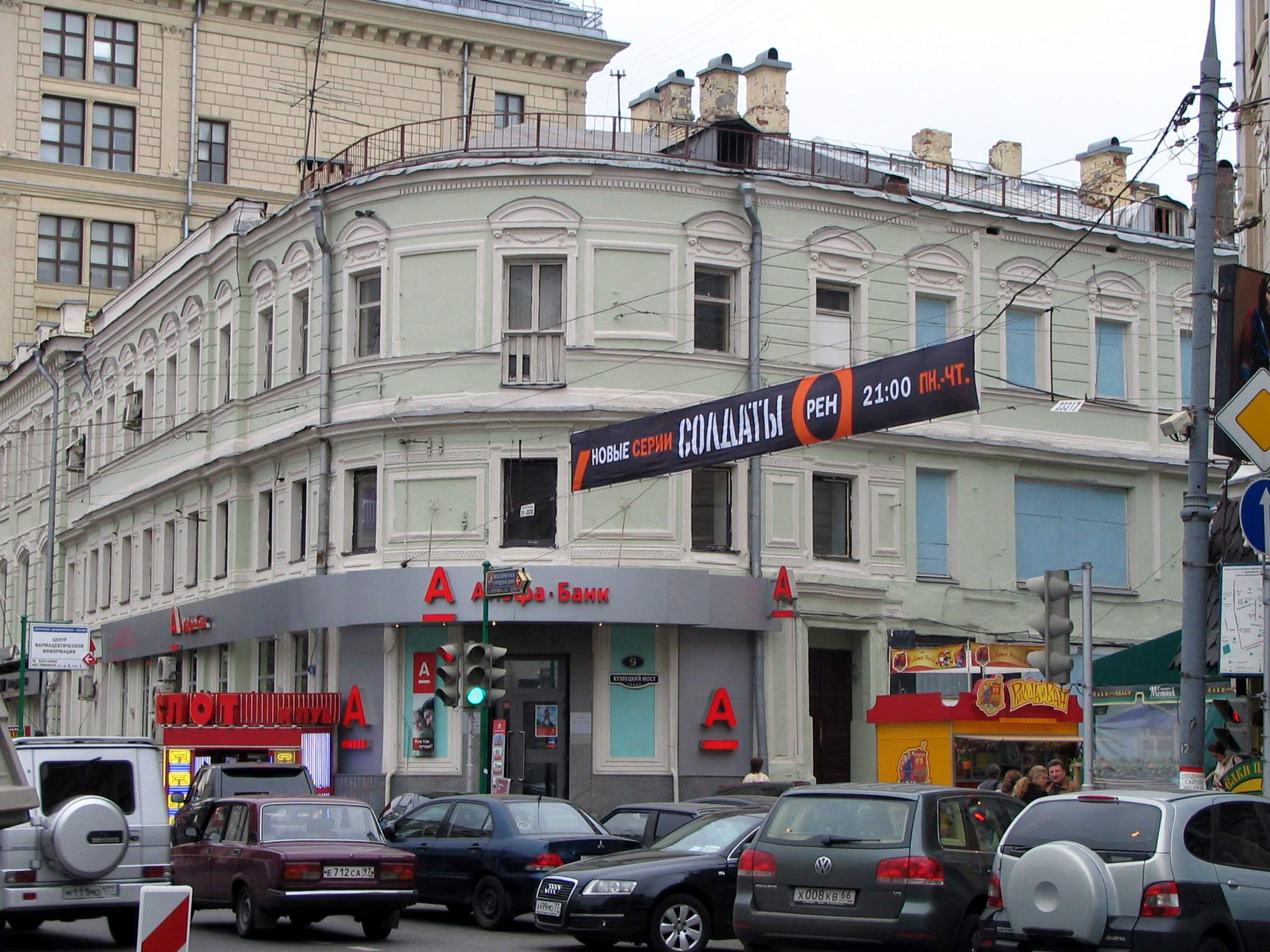
