= TsUM (Moscow) =

Department store in Moscow, Russia

Coordinates: 55°45′38″N 37°37′11″E

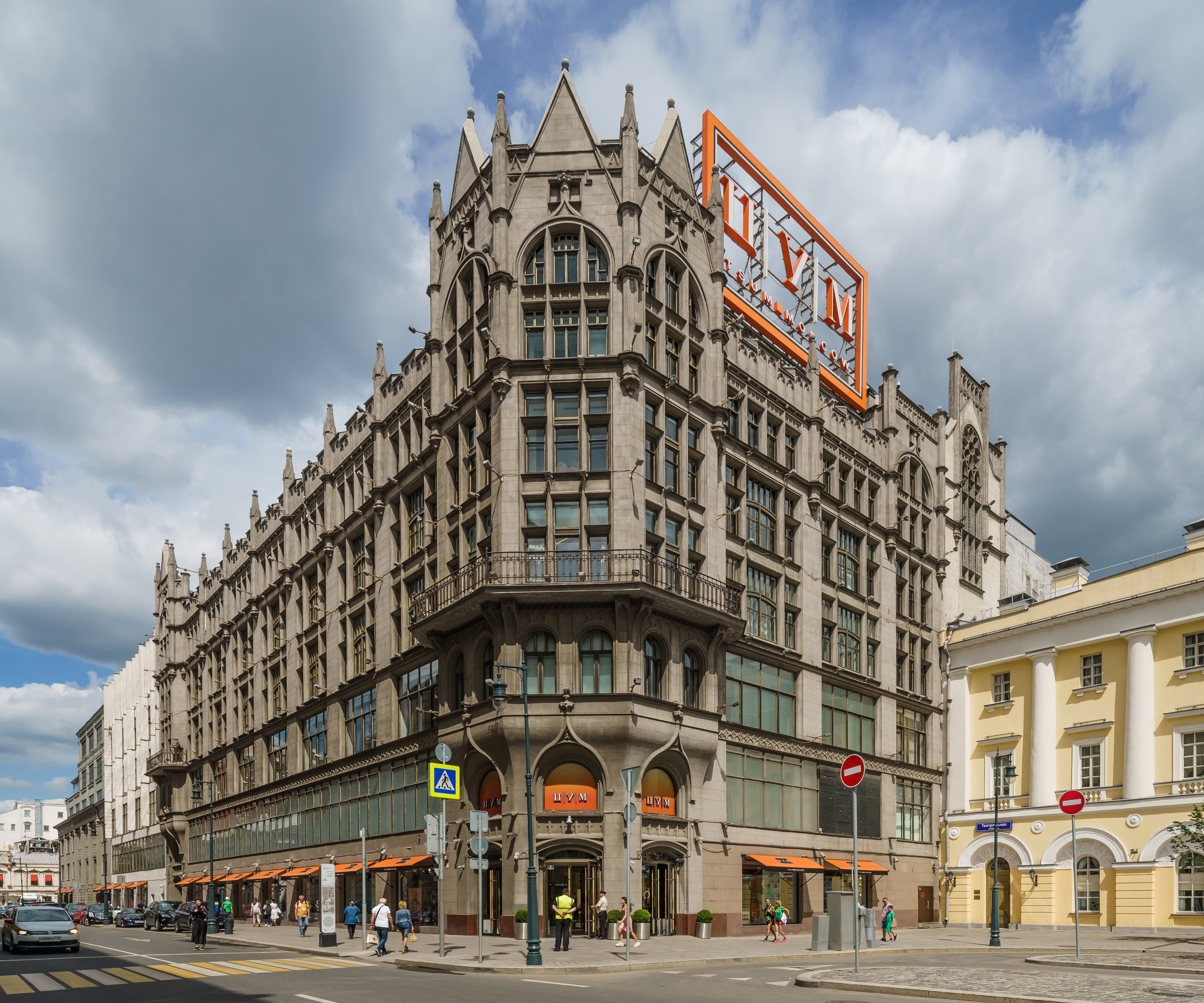
TsUM, on Theatre Square in Moscow.

TsUM — Central Universal Department Store (Russian: ЦУМ – Центральный универсальный магазин, romanized: TsUM – Tsentralʹnyĭ universalʹnyĭ magazin) is a high-end department store in Moscow.

The store is in a six-story historical Gothic Revival style building on Petrovka Street at Theatre Square (Teatralnaya Ploshchad) in the Tverskoy District of central Moscow. The TsUM interiors have been refurbished many times, most recently in 2007. TsUM is a part of the Mercury Group.

== TsUM today ==
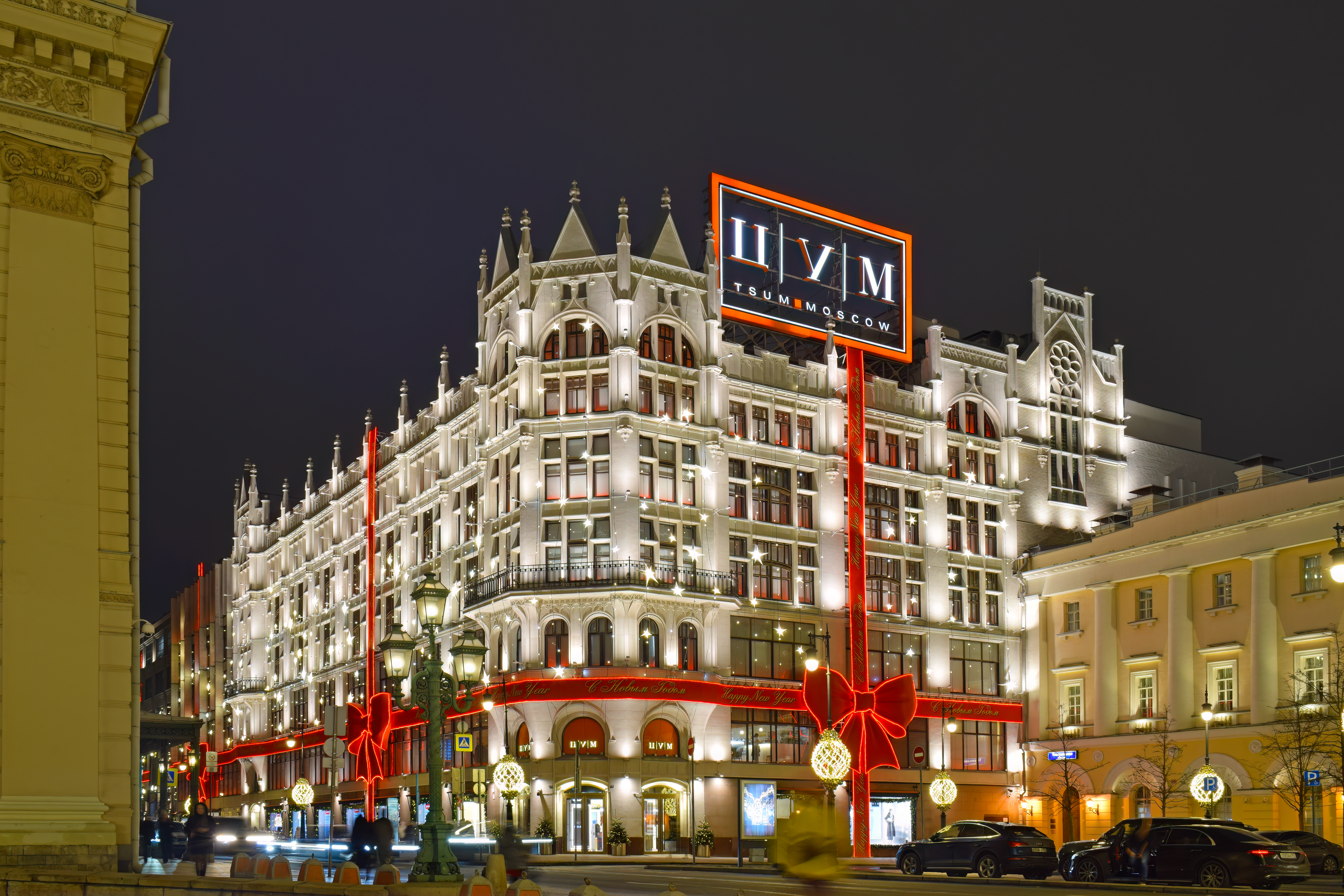
TsUM, 17 January 2025

TsUM is the largest fashion department store in Eastern Europe. It carries more than 1000 brands of apparel, a perfumery and jewelry, as well as “TsUM Globus Gourmet”, a fusion restaurant, a cigar room, a café and a champagne bar.

TsUM seasonal collections have been supported by advertising campaigns featuring Cindy Crawford, Milla Jovovich, Naomi Campbell, Daria Werbowy, Malgosia Bela, and Mathias Lauridsen.

Notable couturiers Roland Mouret, Ralph Rucci, Carolina Herrera, Dennis Basso, Michael Kors and Victoria Beckham have participated in TsUM events, introducing their newest collections to TsUM clients in person.

TsUM offers clients additional services, including VIP shopping and professional stylists’ advice, cosmetic procedures and lectures on modern art.

== History ==
=== Muir & Mirrielees Co. ===
In 1857 merchants Andrew Muir (1817–1899) and Archibald Mirrielees (1797–1877), who had arrived in St. Petersburg separately, founded the “Muir and Mirrielees” Trading Company. Archibald Mirrielees was resident in St. Petersburg from 1822. In 1843 he established his own company, one of the most significant Anglo-Russian merchant houses.

In the 1880s the company transferred from St. Petersburg to Moscow and acquired a building for their haberdashery shop in Theatre Square. Their new building was erected there in 1908 in the Gothic Revival style with some modern elements. The project was designed by the famous Russian architect Roman Klein. “Muir and Mirrielees” was the first and the largest department store in the last days of the Russian Empire. Offering clothes, shoes, jewelry, perfumery, and toys, the store attracted the highest public interest: “In the eyes of the Muscovites 'Muir and Mirrielees' is a kind of exhibition of everything that was on sale in the capital, be it for the rich and the high society, or for the middle-class customers" wrote one of the contemporaries. The store delivered throughout the Russian empire.

The company established a furniture factory and other stores (Торговый дом Хомякова (in Russian), Маросейка (in Russian)). The company was nationalised during the Russian Revolution and the assets confiscated in 1918 by the Bolsheviks, who renamed "Muir & Mirrielees", first to "MosTorg" in 1922 and later to TsUM.

In 2013 the European Capital Investment Fund, owner of the majority of TsUM's shares, forced a buyout from minority shareholders; the company was subsequently delisted from the Moscow Exchange.

== TsUM branches ==
The TsUM branch in Barvikha Luxury Village opened in April 2008. The TsUM Outlet opened in June 2009 in Mega Teply Stan, and is a discount store carrying the preceding season's collections of TsUM brands.

== Charitable and cultural activity ==
TsUM has participated in a number of charitable projects: in September 2009 TsUM organized an action to support orphans, in March 2010 a photo-project to support the struggle against cancer was presented.

Exhibitions and art projects are supported by TsUM Art Foundation (specializing in modern art). As a part of the II Moscow Biennale of Contemporary Art in 2007 TsUM presented the “American video-art” project. It was followed by Yoko Ono’s solo exhibition “The Odyssey of Cockroach”, the exhibition of Chinese art “China, forward!”, and Oleg Kulik’s “MOSCOW. TsUM” installation project in 2009.
