= Neglinnaya (river) =

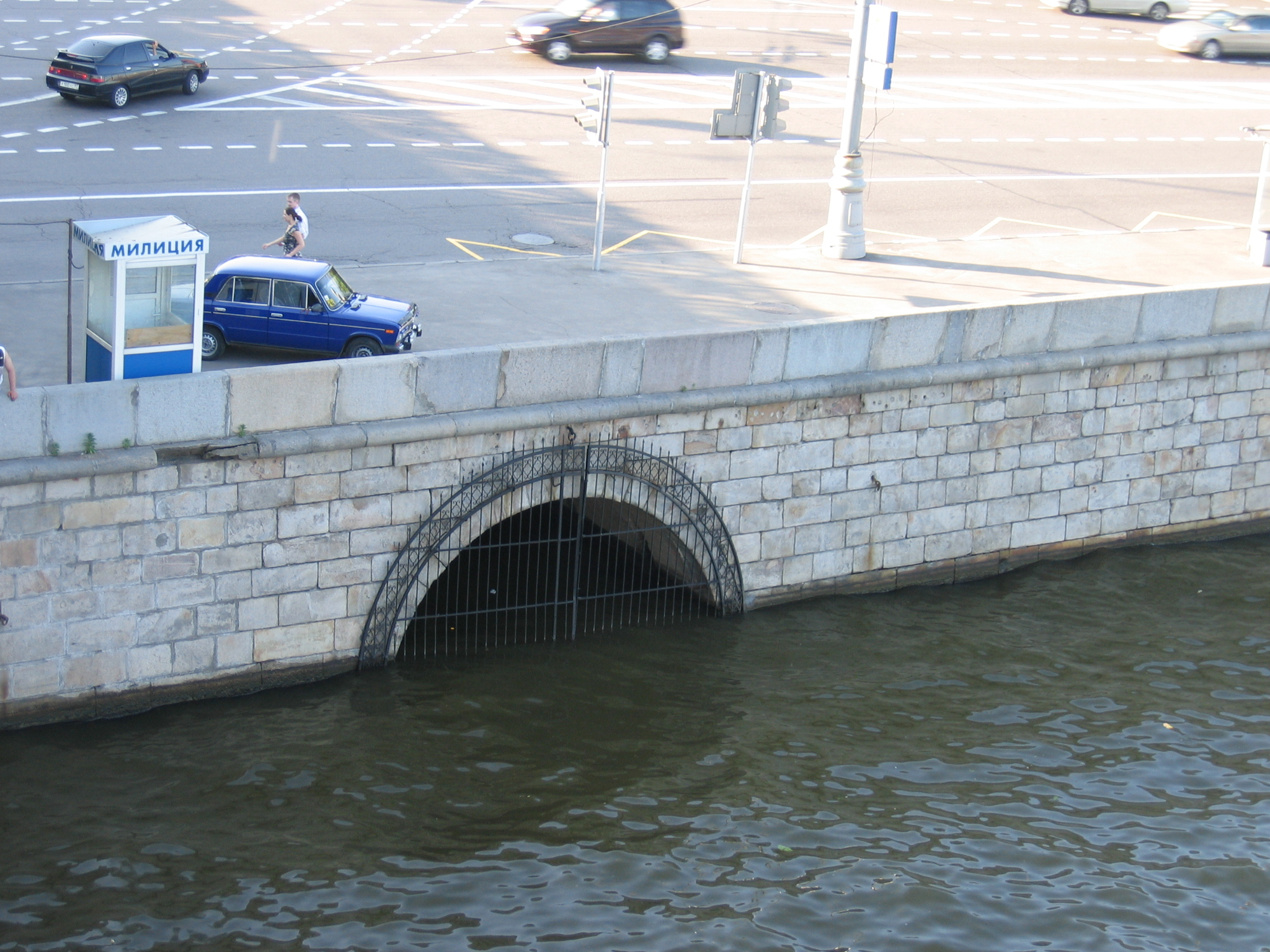
- The Neglinnaya discharges into the Moskva through two tunnels, of which this is one.
- Native name: Неглинная (Russian)

Location
- Country: Russia

Physical characteristics
- Mouth: Moskva
  - coordinates: 55°44′59″N 37°37′35″E
- Length: 7.5 km (4.7 mi)

Basin features
- Progression: Moskva→ Oka→ Volga→ Caspian Sea

The Neglinnaya (Russian: Неглинная, IPA: [nʲɪˈɡlʲinːəjə]), also known as Neglinka, Neglinna, Neglimna (Неглинка, Неглинна, Неглимна), is a 7.5 km underground river in the central part of Moscow and a tributary of the river Moskva. It flows in the tunnels under Samotechnaya Street, Tsvetnoy Boulevard, Neglinnaya Street, Alexander Garden, and Zaryadye. The Neglinnaya discharges into the Moskva through two separate tunnels near Bolshoy Kamenny Bridge and Bolshoy Moskvoretsky Bridge.

== History ==
The river in its natural state used to flow openly from the northern parts of Moscow to the south across the very centre of the city. The Kremlin was built on a hill east of the Neglinnaya, using the river as a moat. The moat did not stop foreign invasions but slowed development of territories west of the Kremlin; initially, the city grew eastward, into Red Square and Kitay-gorod. When Muscovites began settling on the western side, territories around the Neglinnaya remained vacant due to frequent flooding.

Muscovites constructed a number of dams, creating a chain of six interconnected ponds, used for firefighting, with watermills, forges, workshops and public baths (Moscow's two best-known public baths, Central and Sandunоvskie, built in 1890s, are still located on Neglinnaya Street). There were four bridges across the Neglinnaya River: Voskresensky Bridge (its fragments unearthed during a 1994 excavation), three-span Kuznetsky Bridge, Trinity Bridge and Petrovsky Bridge (the remains of the last were discovered during the reconstruction of the Maly Theatre).

The first plans to rebuild the Neglinnaya River, presented in 1775, materialized in 1792. A new masonry canal, one sazhen (2.13 m) wide, was laid parallel to the Neglinnaya; after diverting water into the channel, builders filled the old river bed with earth. After the Fire of Moscow (1812), the canal was so polluted that the city cleared it and covered with a masonry vault, creating the first Neglinnaya Tunnel (1817–1819), which also formed present-day Neglinnaya Street and Theatre Square. Before centralised city sewage (1887), the tunnel doubled as a sewer, dumping the refuse into the Moskva River.

The first reconstruction (1910–1914) replaced part of the tunnel with a larger pipe, but was terminated by World War I. This new pipe, designed by engineer Schekotov (Schekotov Tunnel), was adequate by any standard, and could suffice, if completed in full length. Narrow cross-section of old pipe, however, could not accommodate the volume of water, especially during high water and freshets, flooding central streets; the most recent catastrophic floods occurred in 1965 (twice) and 1973 (also twice).

In 1966, the city built a second arm for the Neglinnaya River (length: 1 km, width: 4 m), cutting the path under Zaryadye. In 1974–1989, after the 1973 flood, the city built a completely-new 4 km tunnel, 3.47 m high and 4.90 m wide, from Durova Street to Metropol Hotel (where the tunnel forks into two branches). The old tunnel was reused as a pipe and cable conduit.

Present-day ponds on Manezhnaya Square (1996) are not the Neglinnaya River but an imitation. The real river runs too deep to be properly displayed. The area is dotted with diminutive statues on subjects taken from Russian fables designed by Zurab Tsereteli.

== Gallery ==
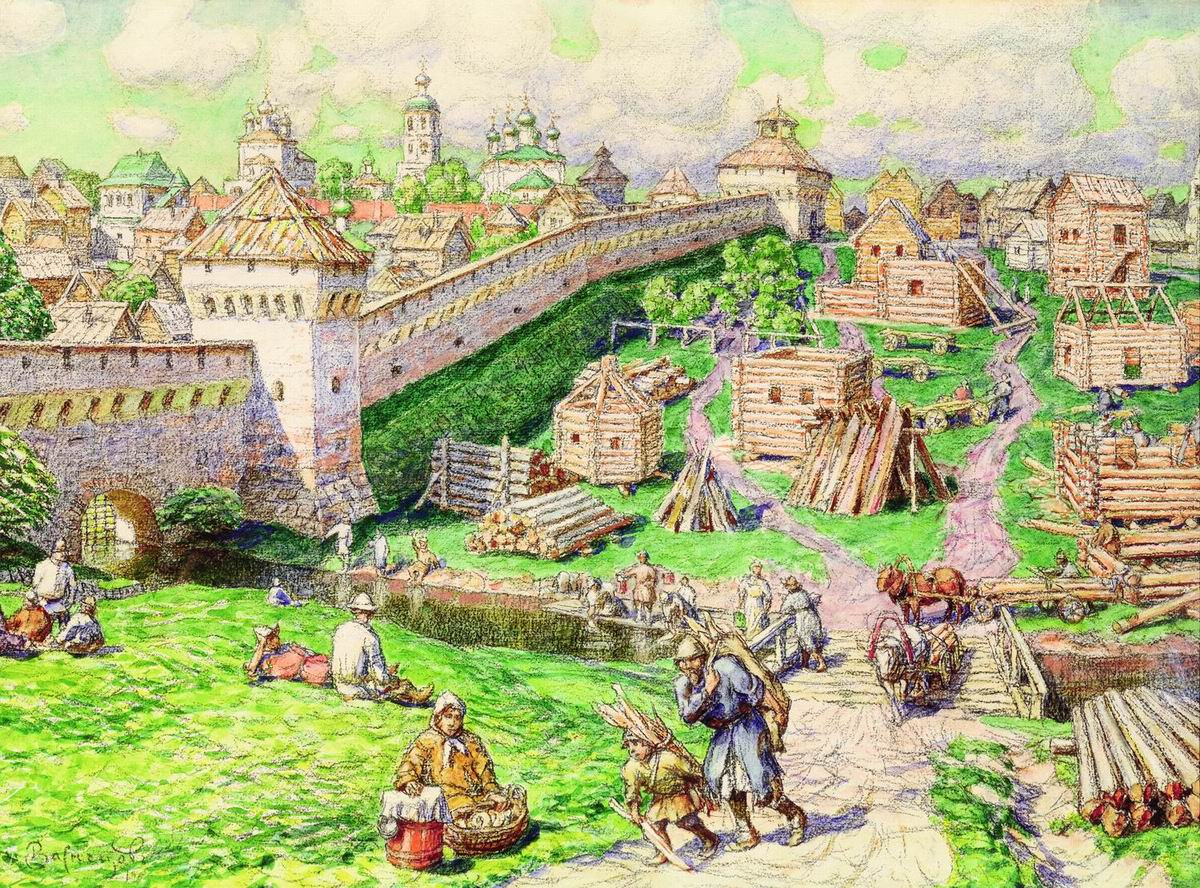
"Truba" ("Tube") in wall of Bely Gorod. By Apollinary Vasnetsov

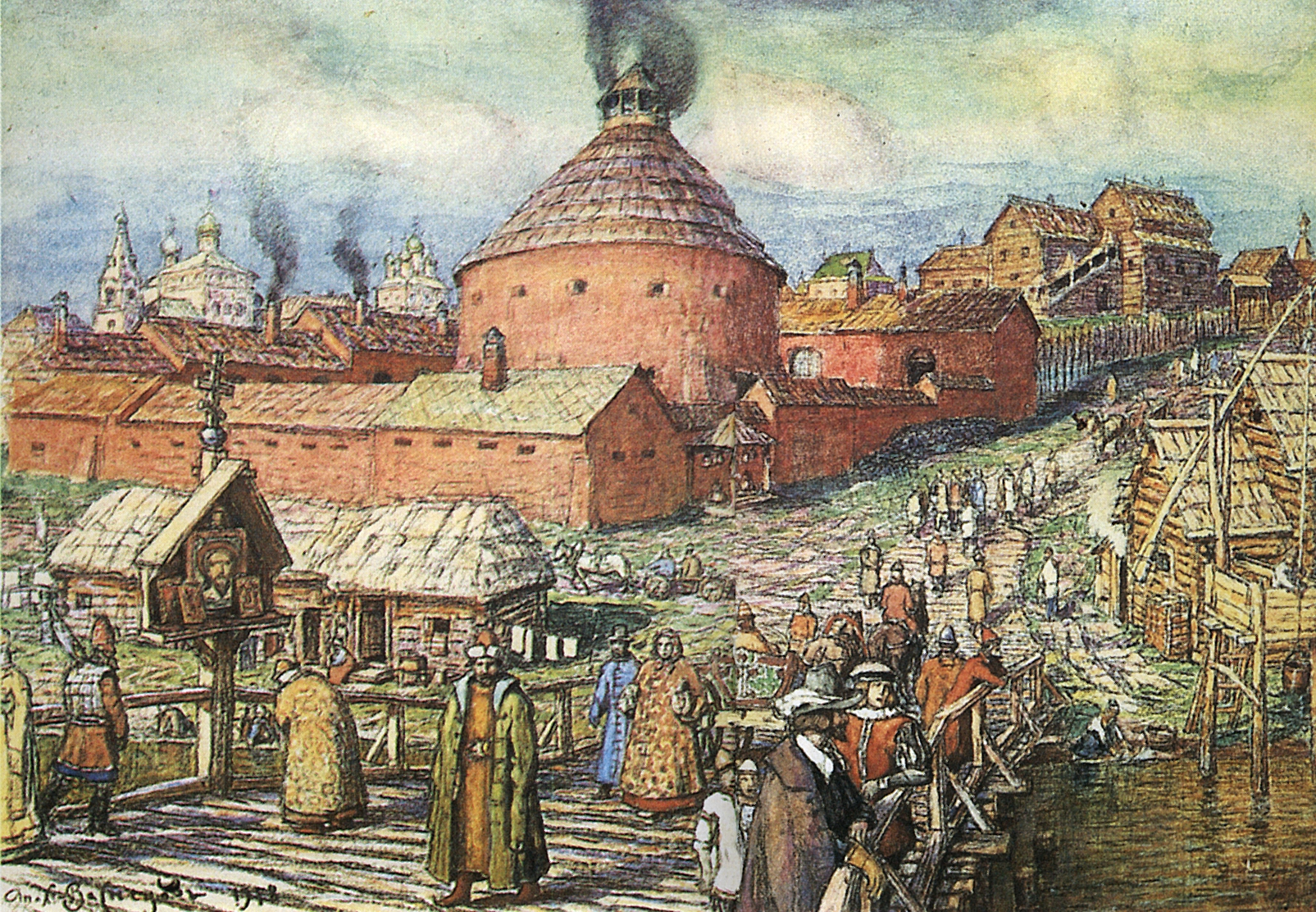
Kuznetsky Bridge. By Apollinary Vasnetsov

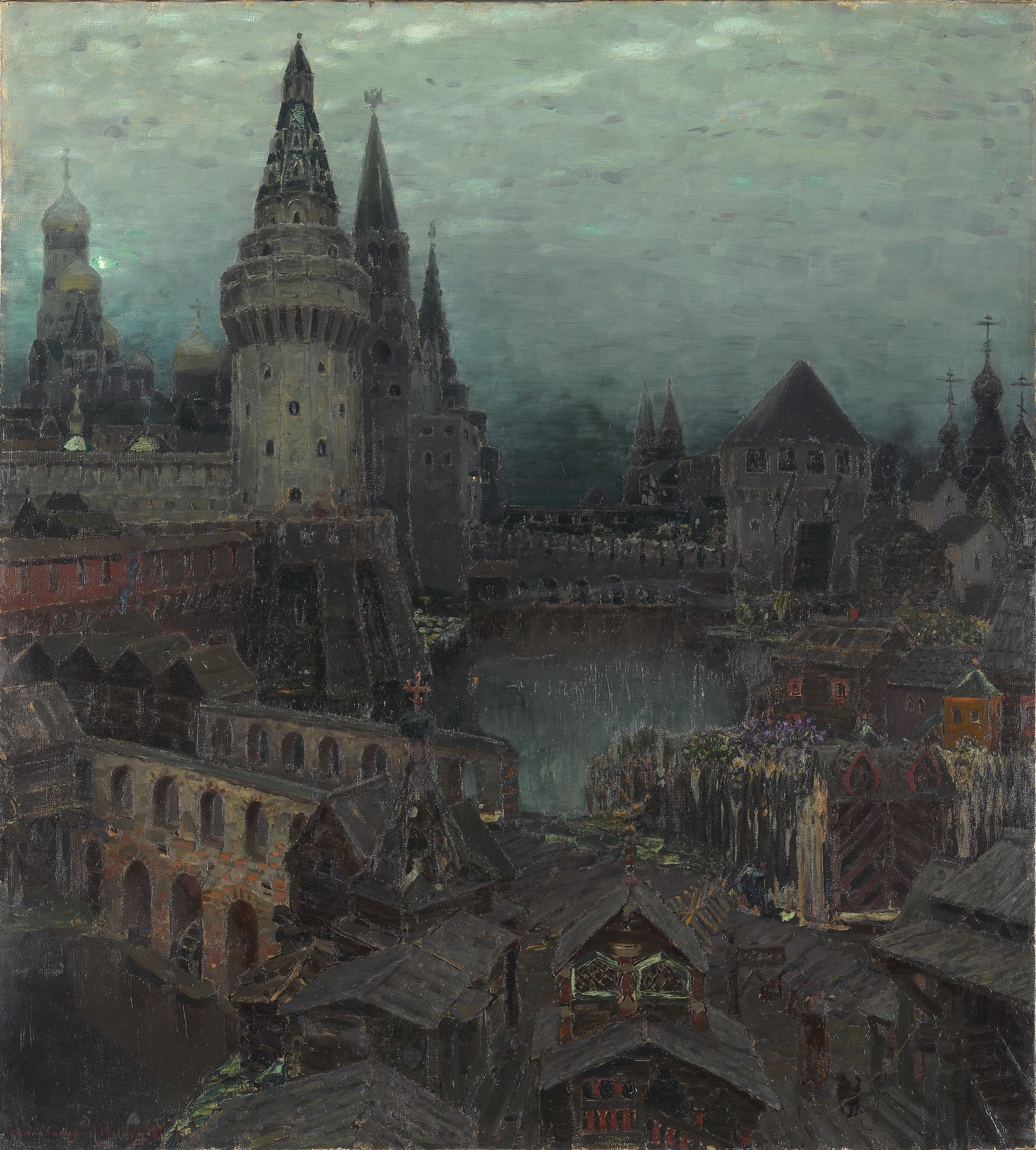
Voskresensky Bridge. By Apollinary Vasnetsov. Away see Troitsky Bridge

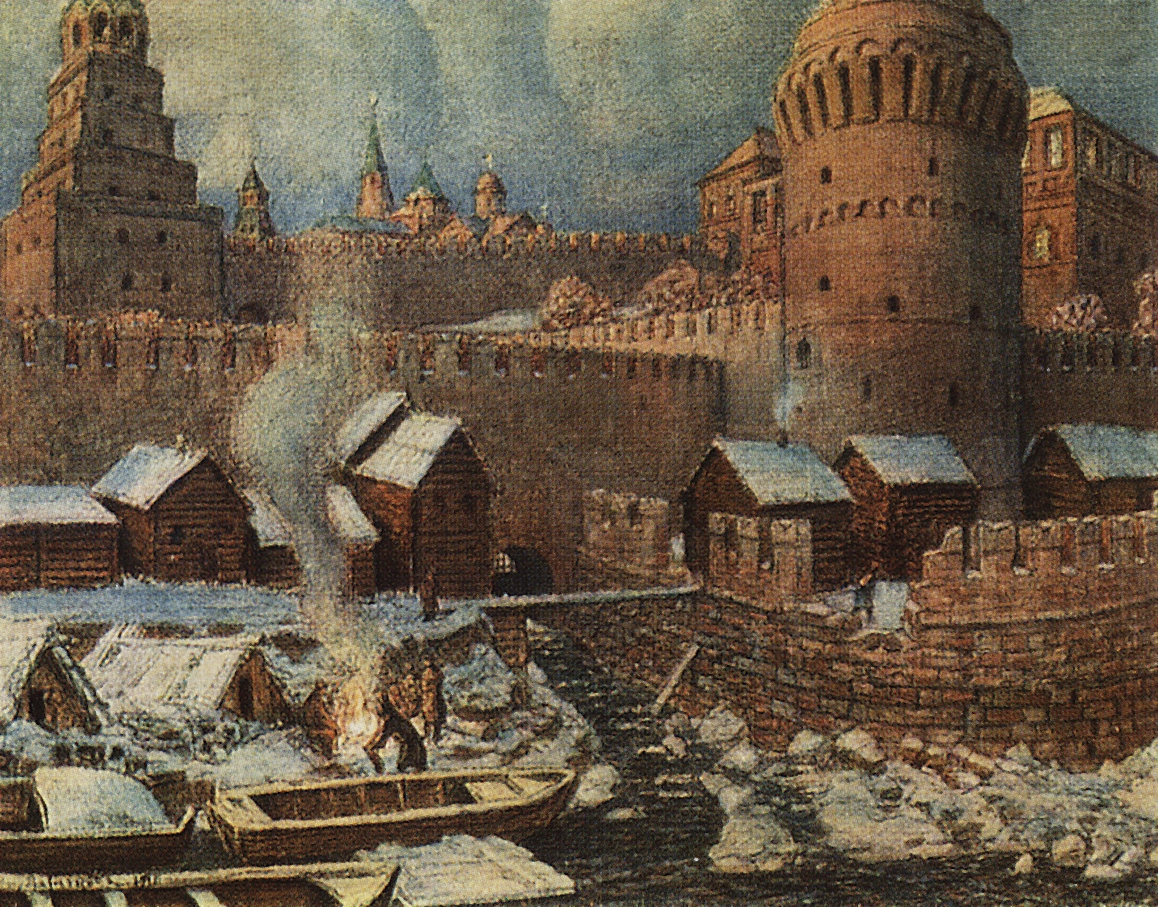
Mouth of Neglinnaya. By Apollinary Vasnetsov

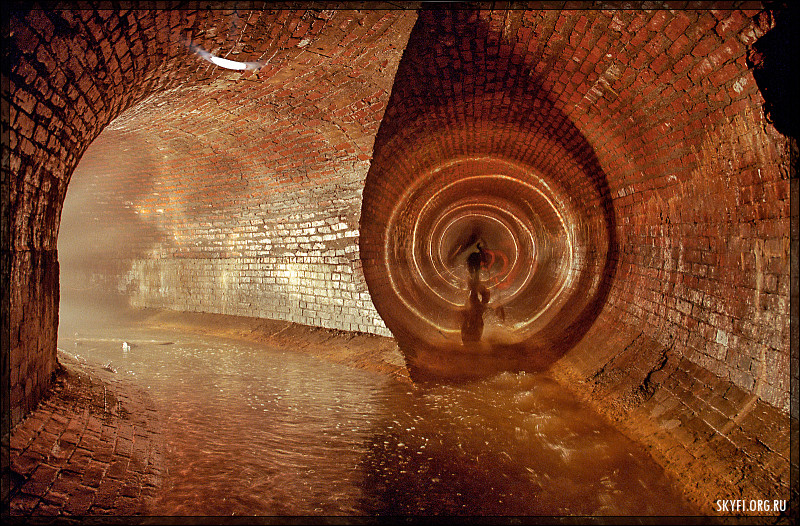
Neglinnaya River approximately under the Animal Theatre

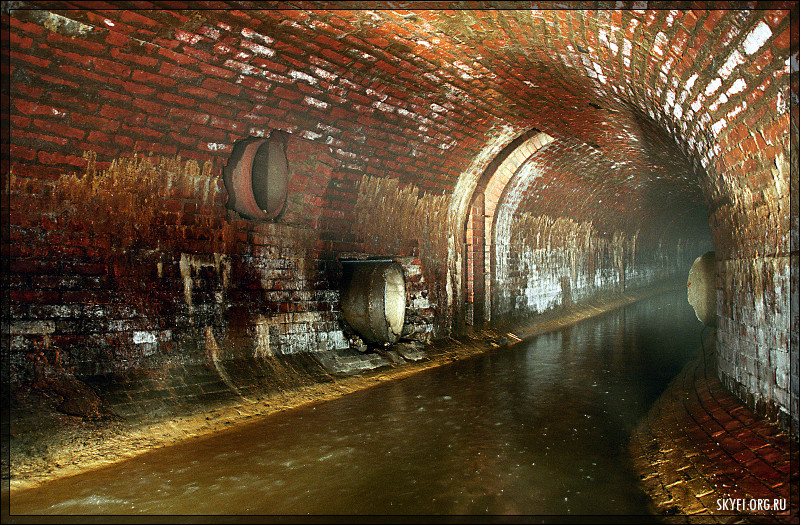
Numerous small connecting pipes to the underground river

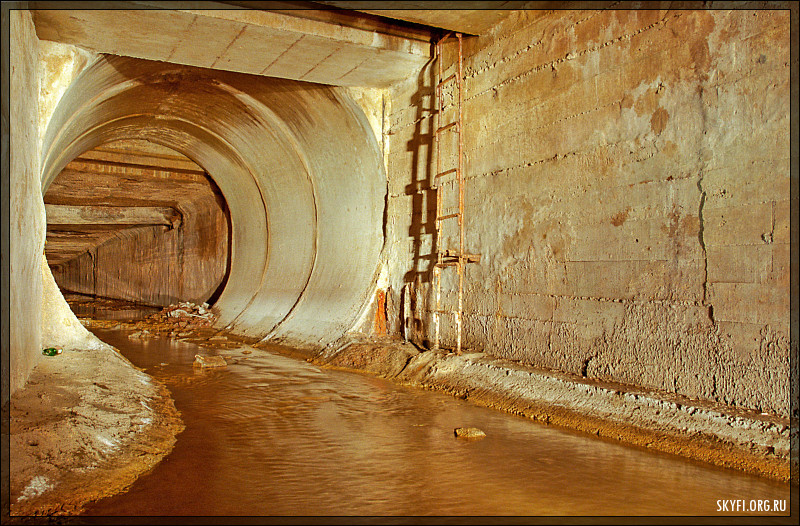
Connecting tunnels

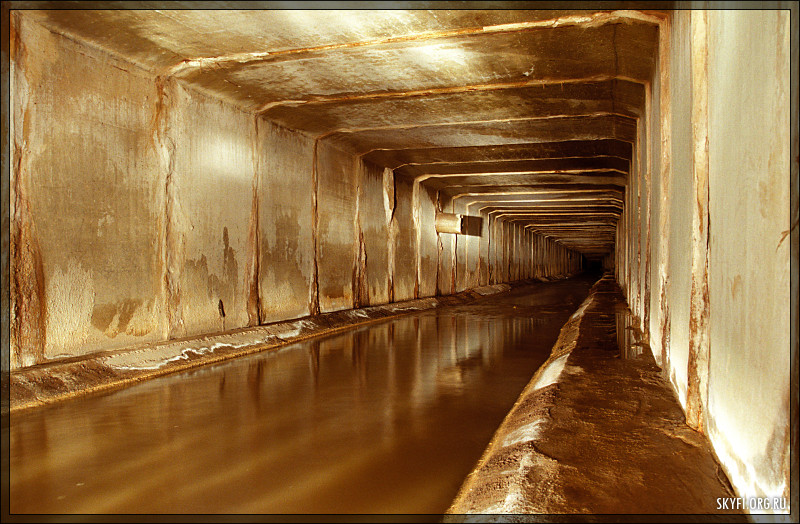
Modern section of the tunnel

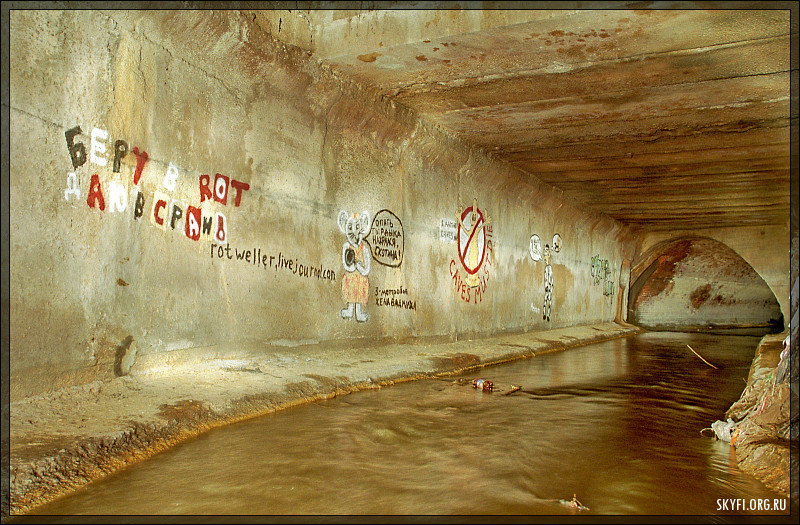
Modern section connecting a historical length of the tunnel

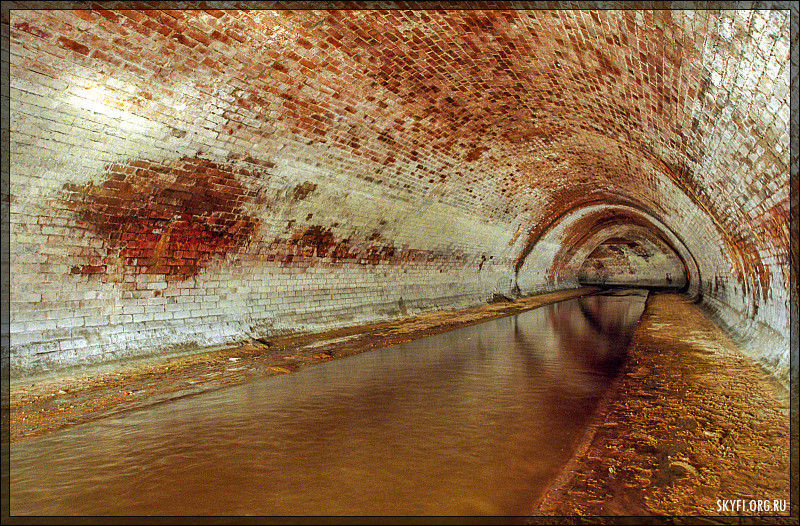
Historical length of the tunnel

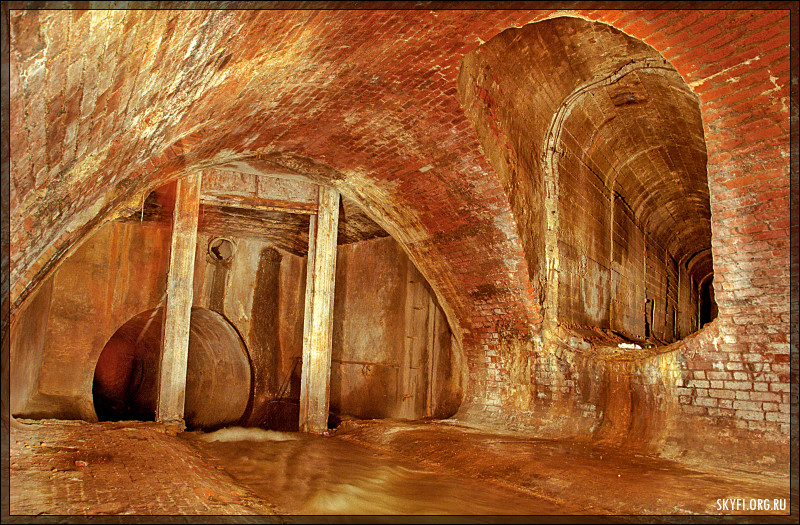
Junction of tunnels

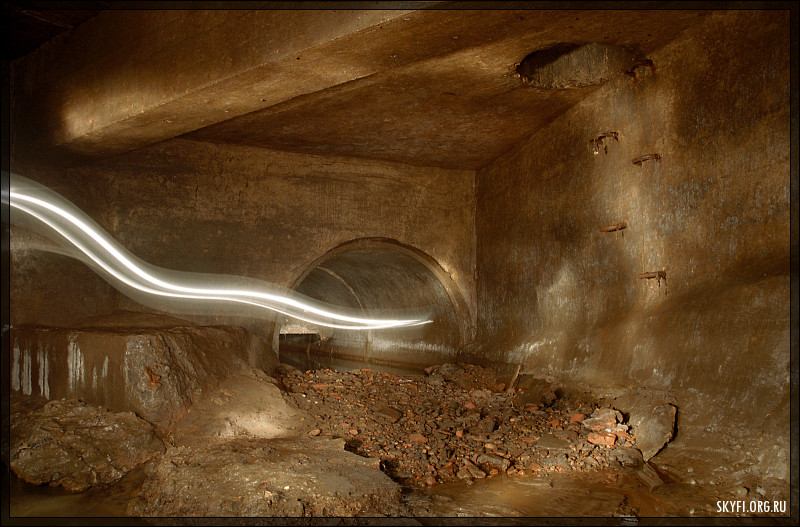
Surface exit
