= List of tourist attractions in Moscow =

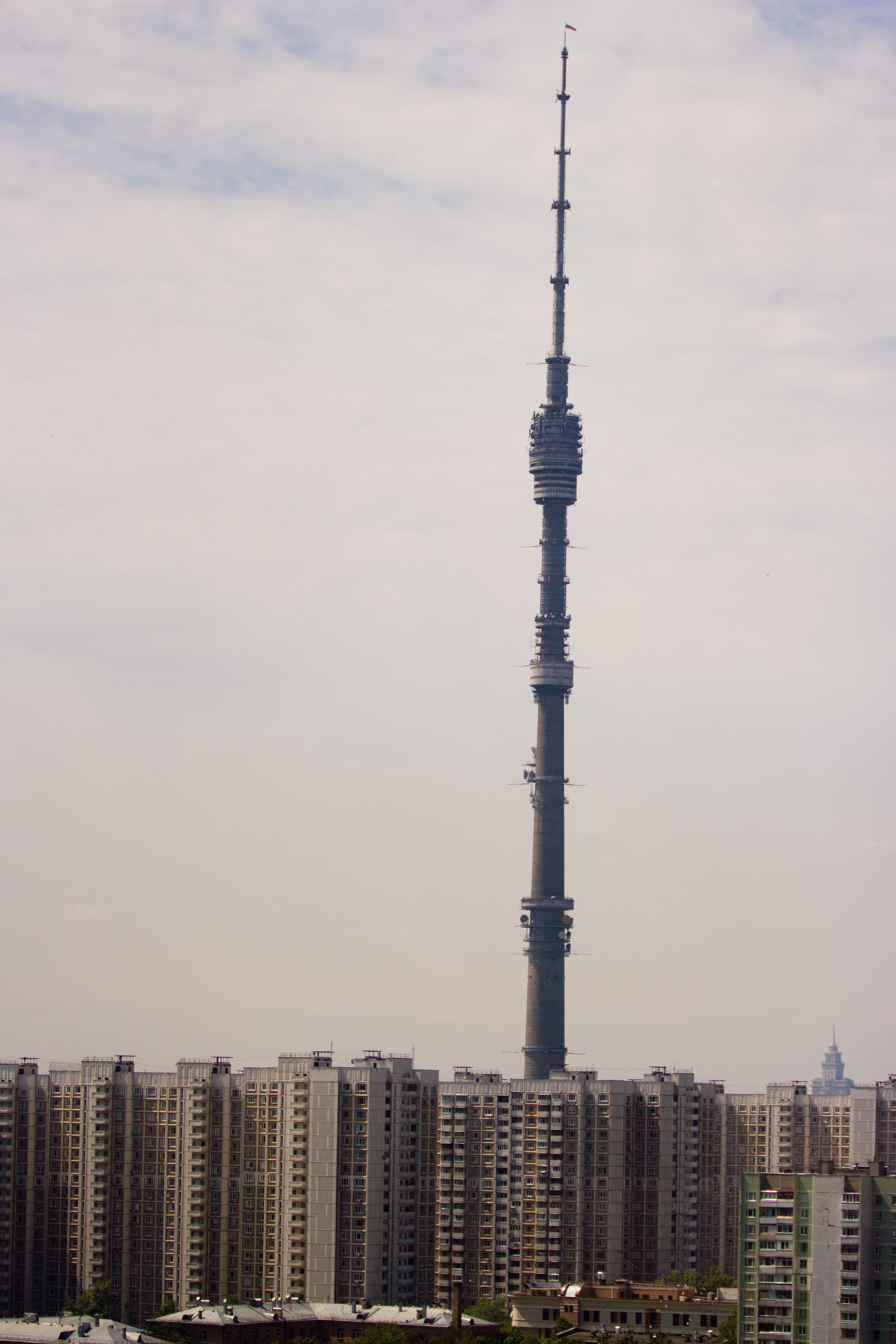
Ostankino Tower, one of the main tourist attractions in Moscow

This is a list of major tourist attractions in the Russian city of Moscow.

== Religious buildings ==
=== Convents and monasteries ===
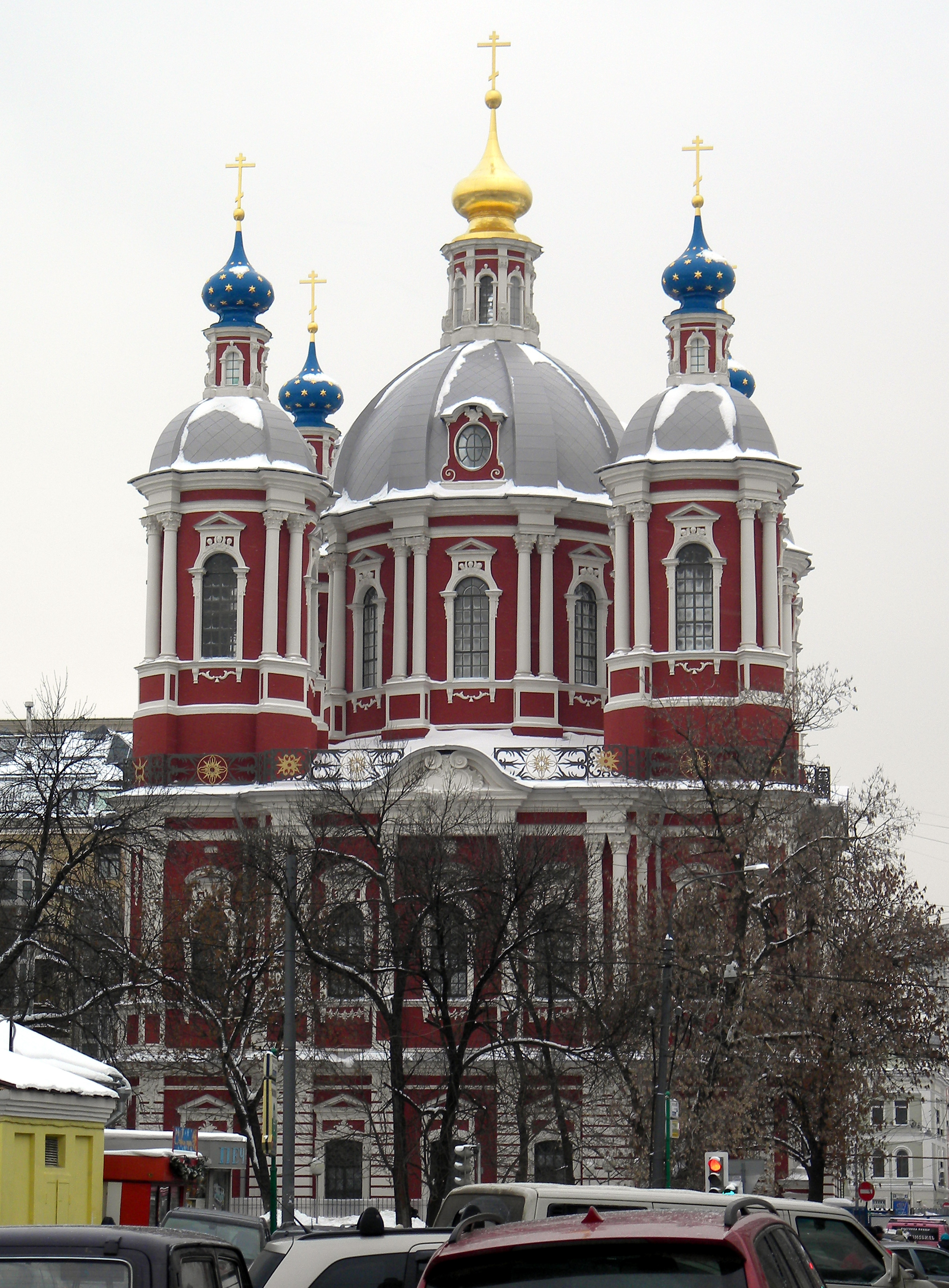
St Clement's Church, Moscow

- St. Andronik Monastery
- Epiphany Monastery
- Chudov Monastery
- Danilov Monastery
- Donskoy Monastery
- Krutitsy
- Marfo-Mariinsky Convent
- Preobrazhenskoye Cemetery
- Novodevichy Convent
- Novospassky Monastery
- Nikolo-Perervinsky Monastery
- Simonov Monastery
- Sretensky Monastery
- Ascension Convent
- Vysokopetrovsky Monastery
- Zaikonospassky monastery
- Chrysostom Monastery

=== Churches ===
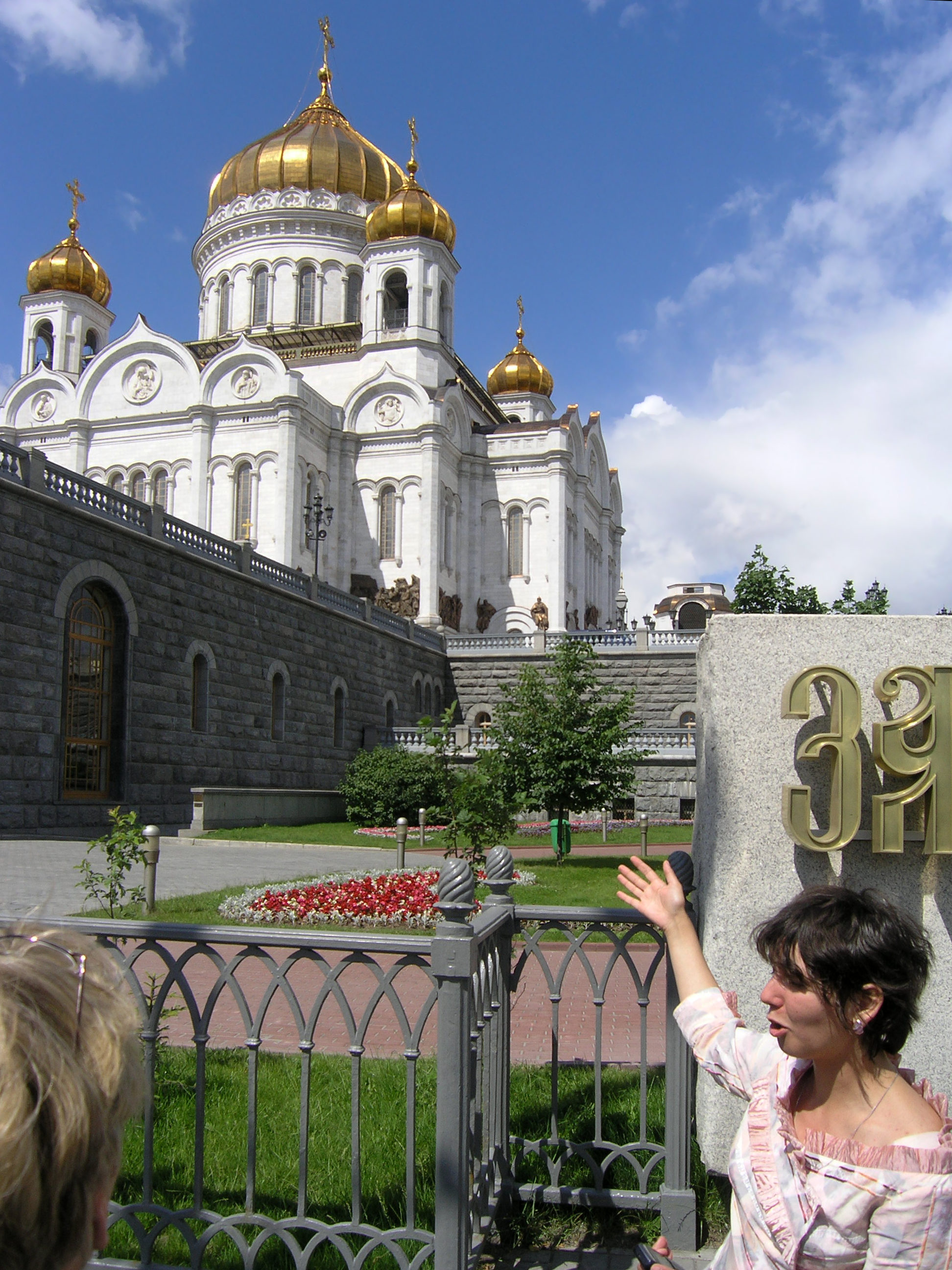
Guided city tour passing Cathedral of Christ the Saviour

Orthodox:

- Saint Basil's Cathedral
- Cathedral of Christ the Saviour
- Yelokhovo Cathedral
- Kazan Cathedral
- Church of the Intercession at Fili
- St Clement's Church, Moscow
- Nativity Church in Putinki
- Iberian Gate and Chapel
- Church of St. John the Warrior
- Church of St. Nicholas in Khamovniki
- Church of All Saints, Moscow
- Church of the Savior on Bolvany

Catholic:

- Cathedral of the Immaculate Conception (Moscow)

=== Religious buildings of other religions ===
- Moscow Cathedral Mosque
- Moscow Choral Synagogue

== Theatres ==
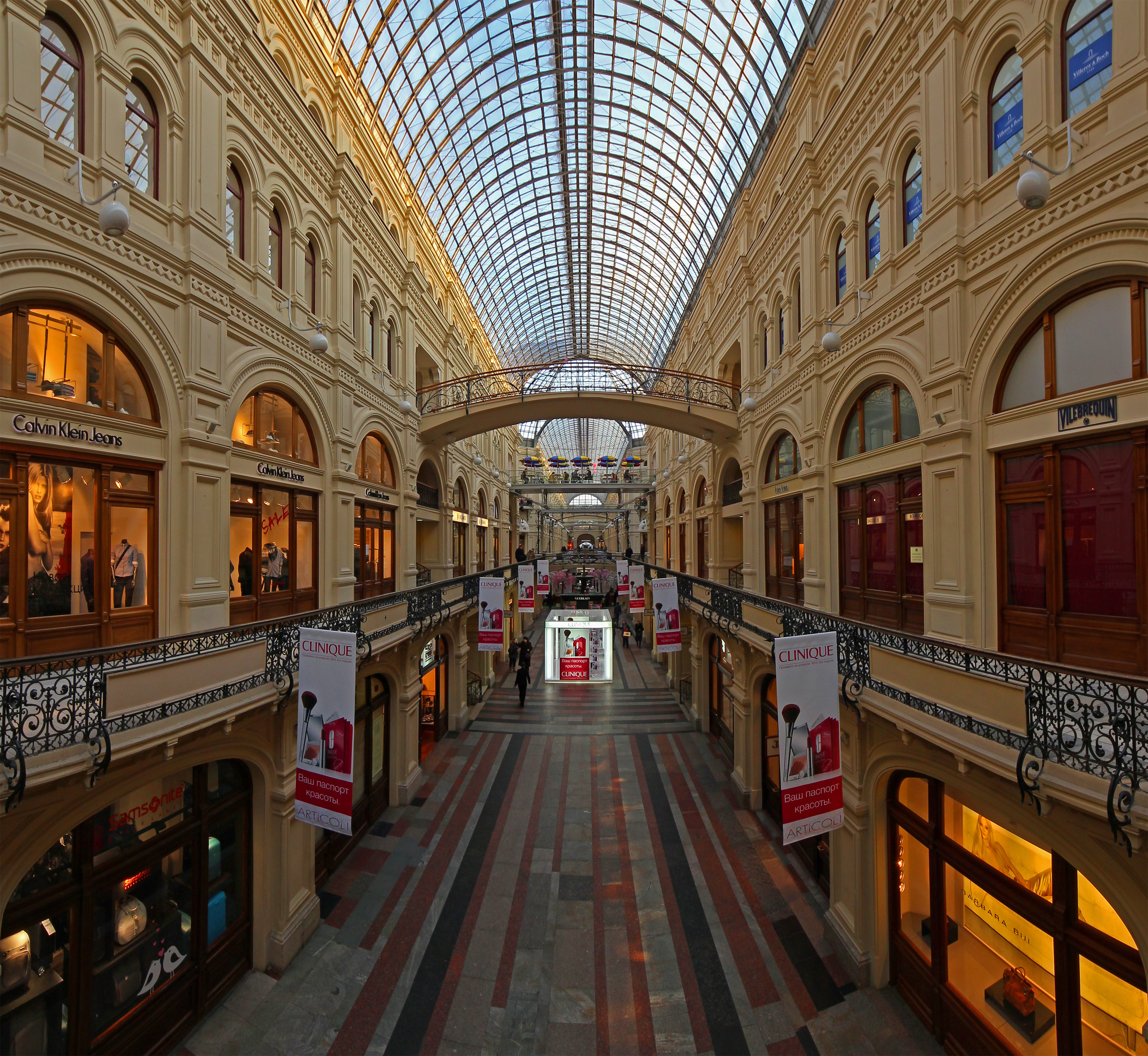
Inside the Upper Trading Rows (named GUM) near Red Square

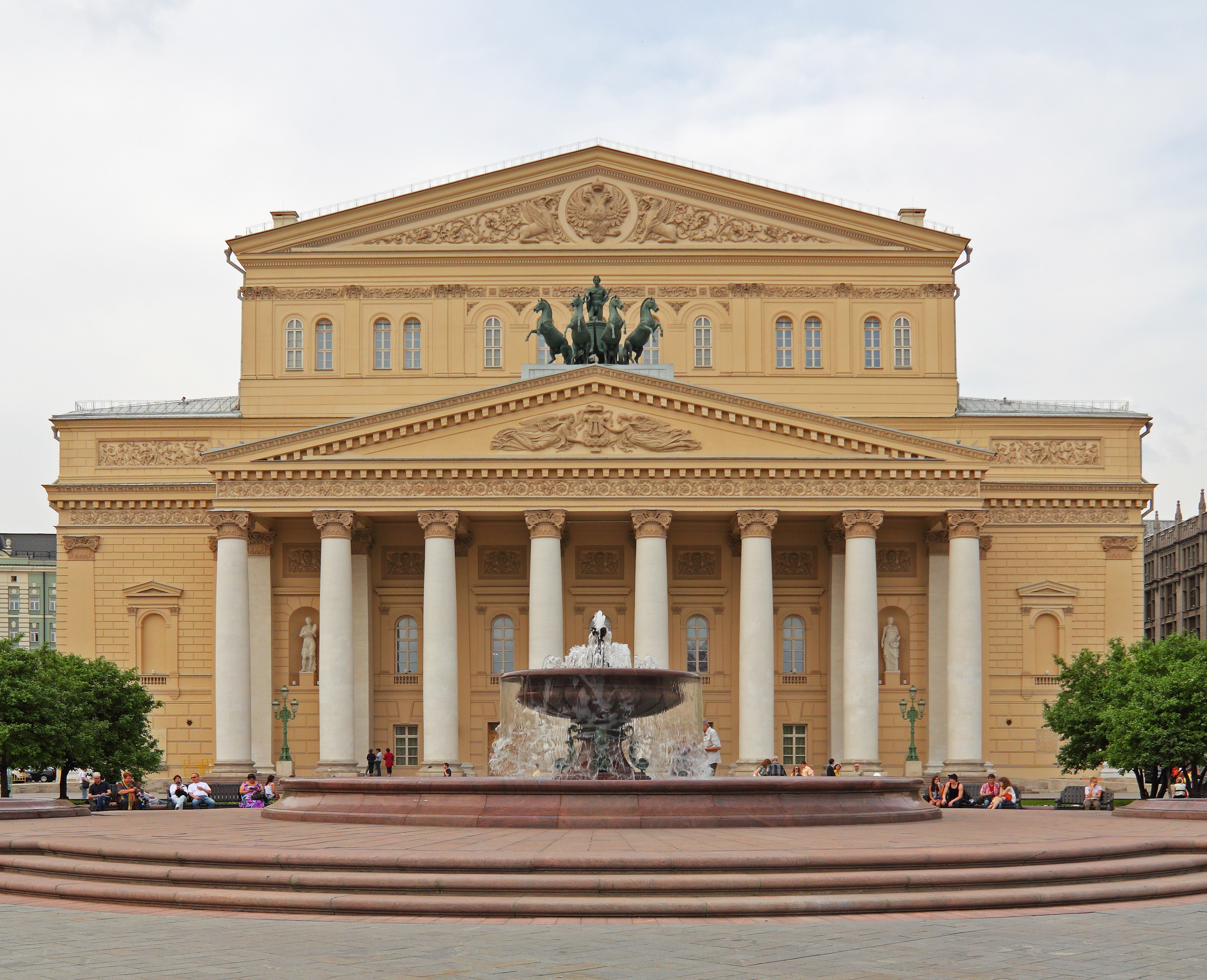
The Bolshoi Theatre

- Moscow Art Theatre
- Bolshoi Theatre
- Lenkom Theatre
- Yermolova Theatre
- Maly Theatre

== Stadiums ==
- Eduard Streltsov Stadium
- Luzhniki Stadium
- Young Pioneers Stadium
- Dynamo Sports Palace
- Dynamo Stadium
- Lokomotiv Stadium
- Khodynka Arena

== Film studios ==
- Mosfilm
- Soyuzmultfilm
- Gorky Film Studio

== Monuments and sculptures ==
- Worker and Kolkhoz Woman
- Monument to Alexander II
- Monument to Minin and Pozharsky
- Monument to the Conquerors of Space
- Children Are the Victims of Adult Vices by Mikhail Shemyakin, located in Bolotnaya (Marsh) Square

== Government buildings ==
- White House, Moscow
- Constitutional Court of the Russian Federation

== Modern buildings ==
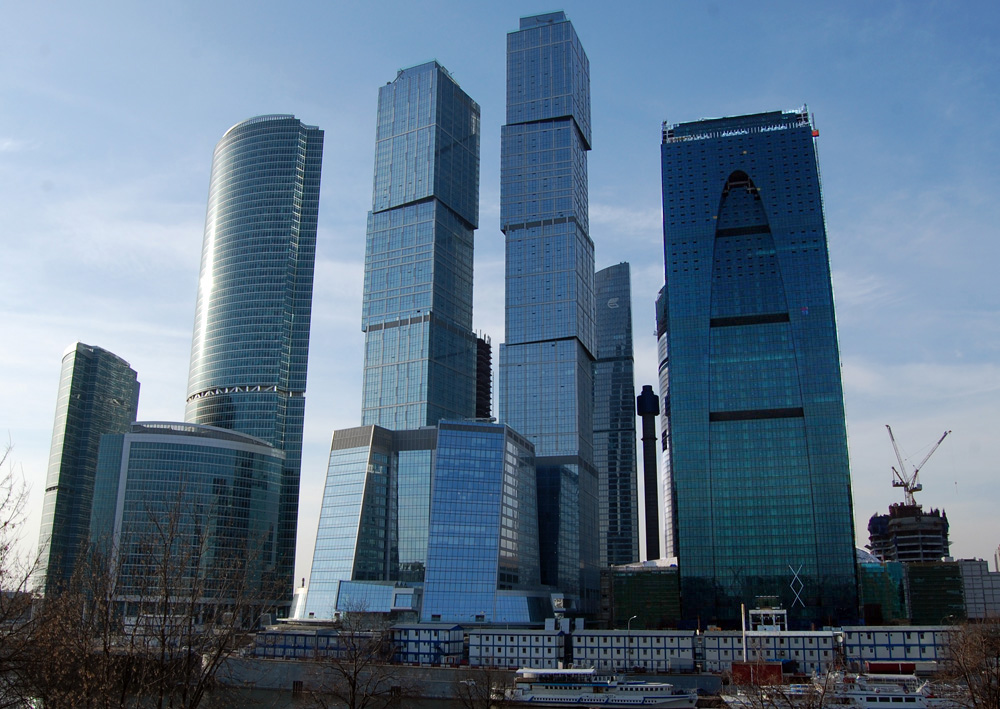
Moscow City in March 2010

- Triumph-Palace
- Golden Ring Hotel

== Moscow International Business Center ==
- City Hall and City Duma
- Federation Tower
- Russia Tower

== Other sights ==
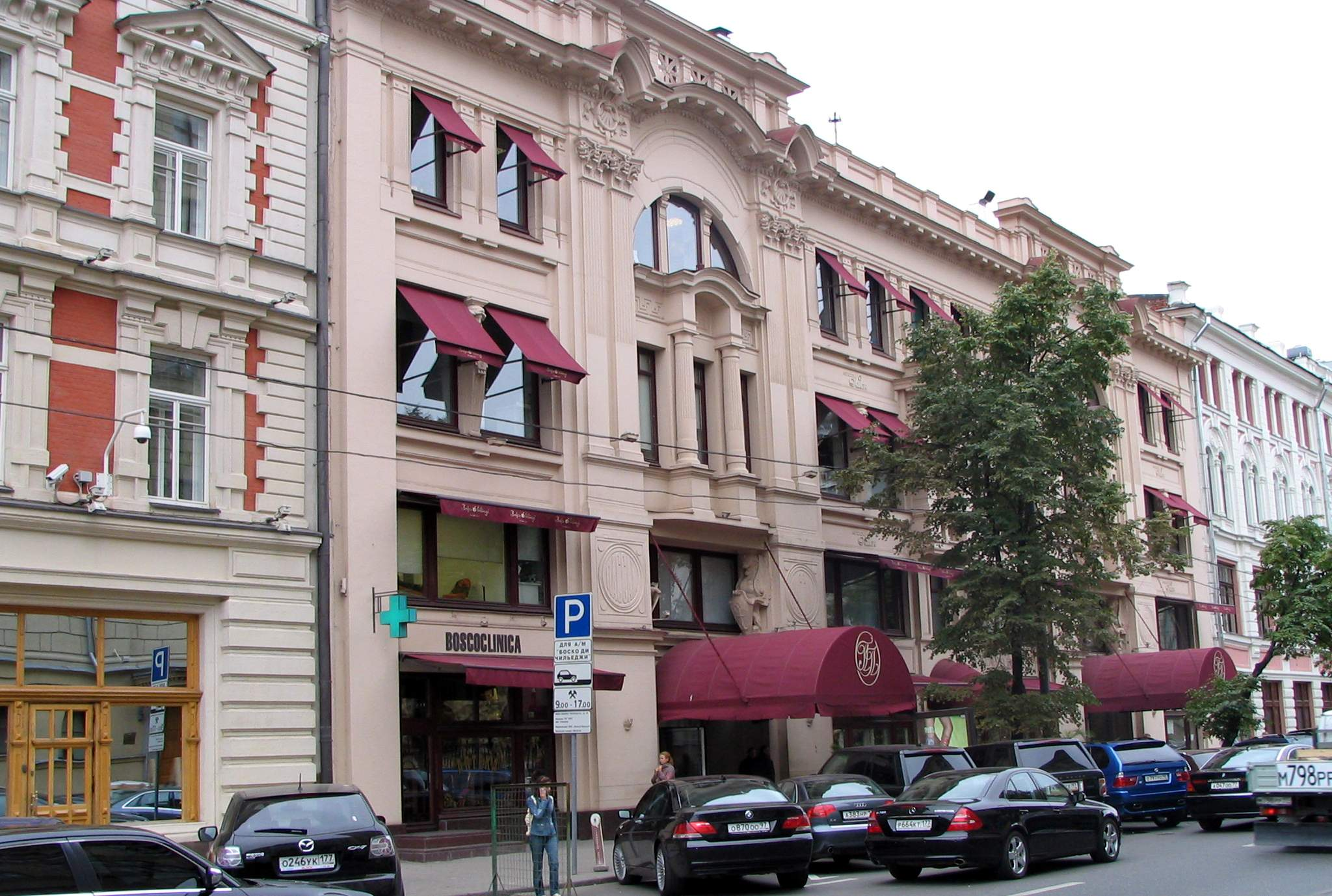
Petrovsky Passage, View from the Neglinnaya Street

- Tallest buildings
- Central Moscow Hippodrome
- Kitai-gorod
- Moscow City Hall
- Moscow School of Painting, Sculpture and Architecture
- Moscow House of Nationalities
- State Public Science and Technical Library
- Manege
- Vlakhernskoye-Kuzminki
- Lubyanka (KGB)
- Moscow Zoo
- Ostankino Tower
- Patriarch's Ponds
- Menshikov Tower
- Moscow Gostiny Dvor
- Moscow Orphanage
- Moscow State Technical University
- Petrovsky Passage
- Hotel Metropol
- Tsoi Wall

== Natural and urban attractions ==
=== Avenues, boulevards, and streets ===
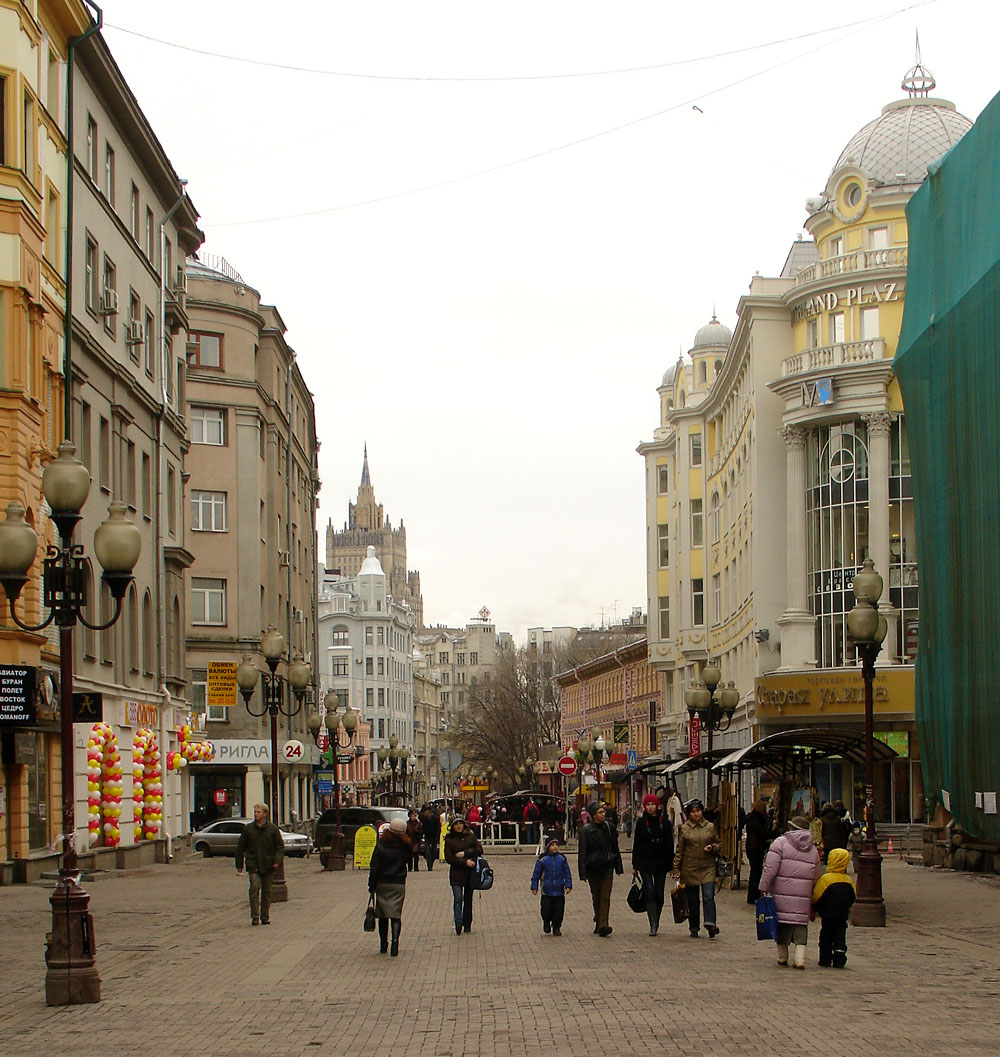
Old Arbat Street, with the Foreign Ministry skyscraper sticking in the background.

- Tsvetnoy Boulevard
- Garden Ring
- Kutuzovsky Prospekt
- Leningradsky Prospekt
- New Arbat Street
- Tretyakov Drive
- Old Arbat
- Cosmonauts Alley
- Kuznetsky Most
- Boulevard Ring
- Great Lubyanka Street
- Tverskaya Street
- Petrovka Street
- Sadovnicheskaya Street
- Povarskaya Street

=== Squares ===
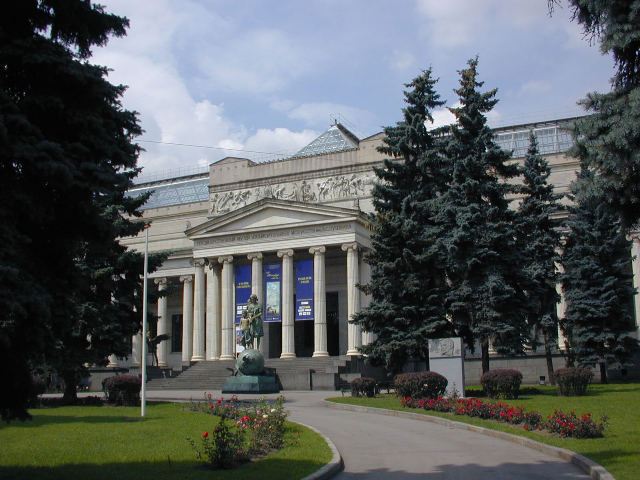
The Pushkin Museum of Fine Arts

- Red Square
- Komsomolskaya Square
- Lubyanka Square
- Manezhnaya Square
- Pushkinskaya Square
- Slavyanskaya Square
- Theatre Square

=== Bridges ===
- List of bridges in Moscow

=== Hills ===
- Poklonnaya Hill
- Sparrow Hills

=== Parks and gardens ===
- All-Russia Exhibition Centre (until 1992 known as the "Exhibition of Achievements of the National Economy", VDNKh)
- Bauman Garden
- Botanical Garden of Academy of Sciences
- Gorky Park
- Izmaylovskiy Park
- Kolomenskoye
- Losiny Ostrov National Park
- Neskuchniy Garden
- Sokolniki Park
- Tsaritsyno Park

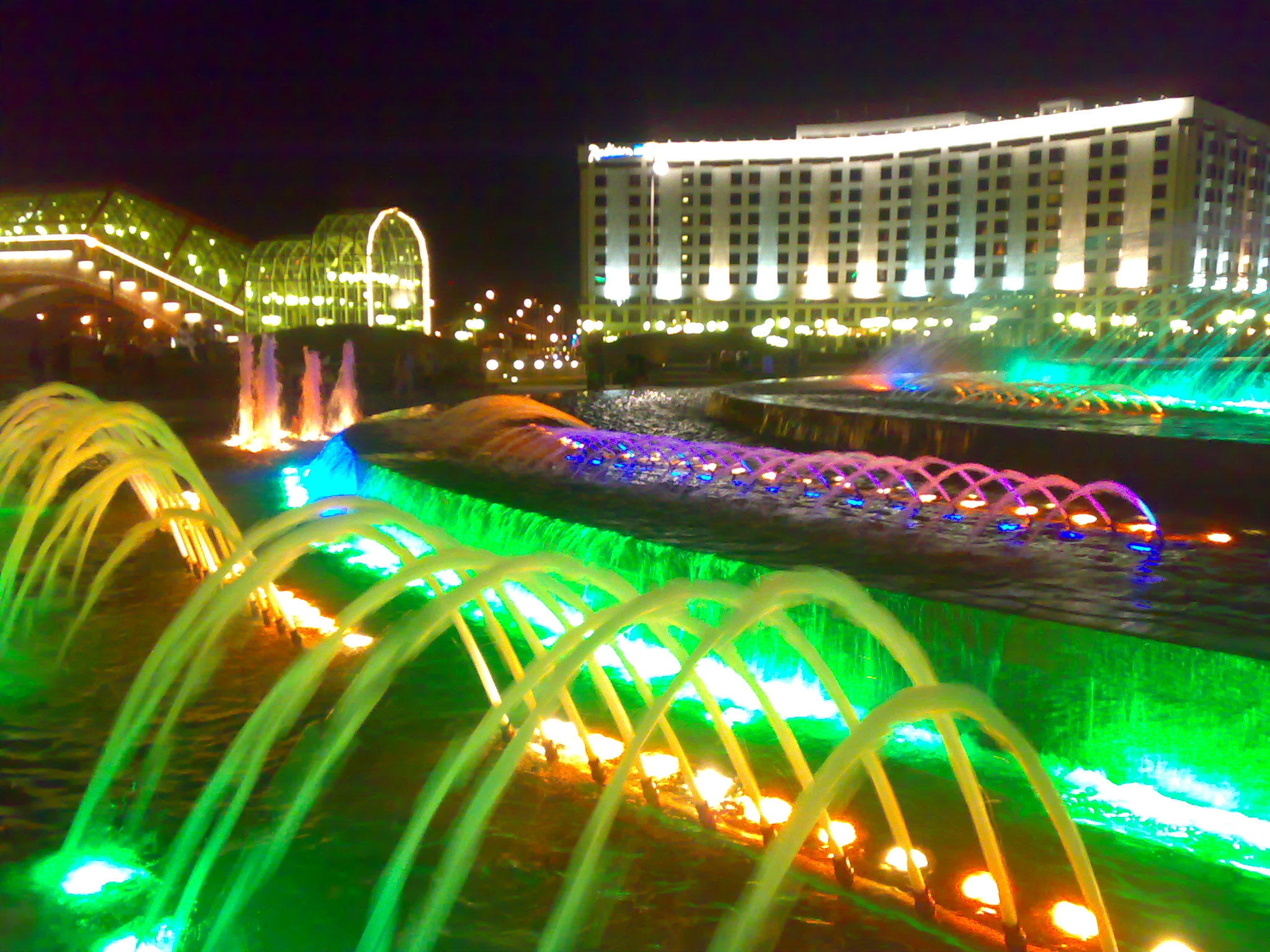
Fountain in Moscow's Square of Europe, lit at night

- Zaryadye Park

=== Districts ===
- Arbat
- Izmaylovo
- Khamovniki
- Kitay-gorod
- Krasnoselsky
- Kuzminki
- Lefortovo
- Maryina roshcha
- Meshchansky
- Presnensky
- Sokolniki
- Tagansky
- Tsaritsyno
- Tverskoy
- Yakimanka
- Zamoskvorechye

=== Moskva River ===
- Vodootvodny Canal
- Balchug

== Transportal architecture ==
=== Moscow rail terminals ===
The nine Moscow rail terminals are located within a kilometer or two outside of the Garden Ring. Below they are listed clockwise, along with a sample of destinations served by each one, starting with the three stations at Komsomolskaya Square:

- Leningradsky Rail Terminal (Saint Petersburg, Tallinn, Helsinki, Murmansk)
- Yaroslavsky Rail Terminal (Yaroslavl, Arkhangelsk, Vladivostok, Beijing)
- Kazanskiy Rail Terminal (Kazan, Almaty, Tashkent)
- Kursky Rail Terminal (Kursk, Sevastopol, Sochi)
- Paveletskiy Rail Terminal (Pavelets, Astrakhan, Baku)
- Kievsky Rail Terminal (Kyiv, Odesa, Budapest)
- Belorussky Rail Terminal (Minsk, Warsaw, Berlin)
- Savyolovskiy Rail Terminal (Savyolovo, Dubna)
- Rizhsky Rail Terminal (Riga)

=== Airports ===
There are five airports serving Moscow:

- Vnukovo International Airport
- Sheremetyevo International Airport
- Domodedovo International Airport
- Zhukovsky International Airport
- Ostafievo International Airport

=== Moscow Metro stations ===
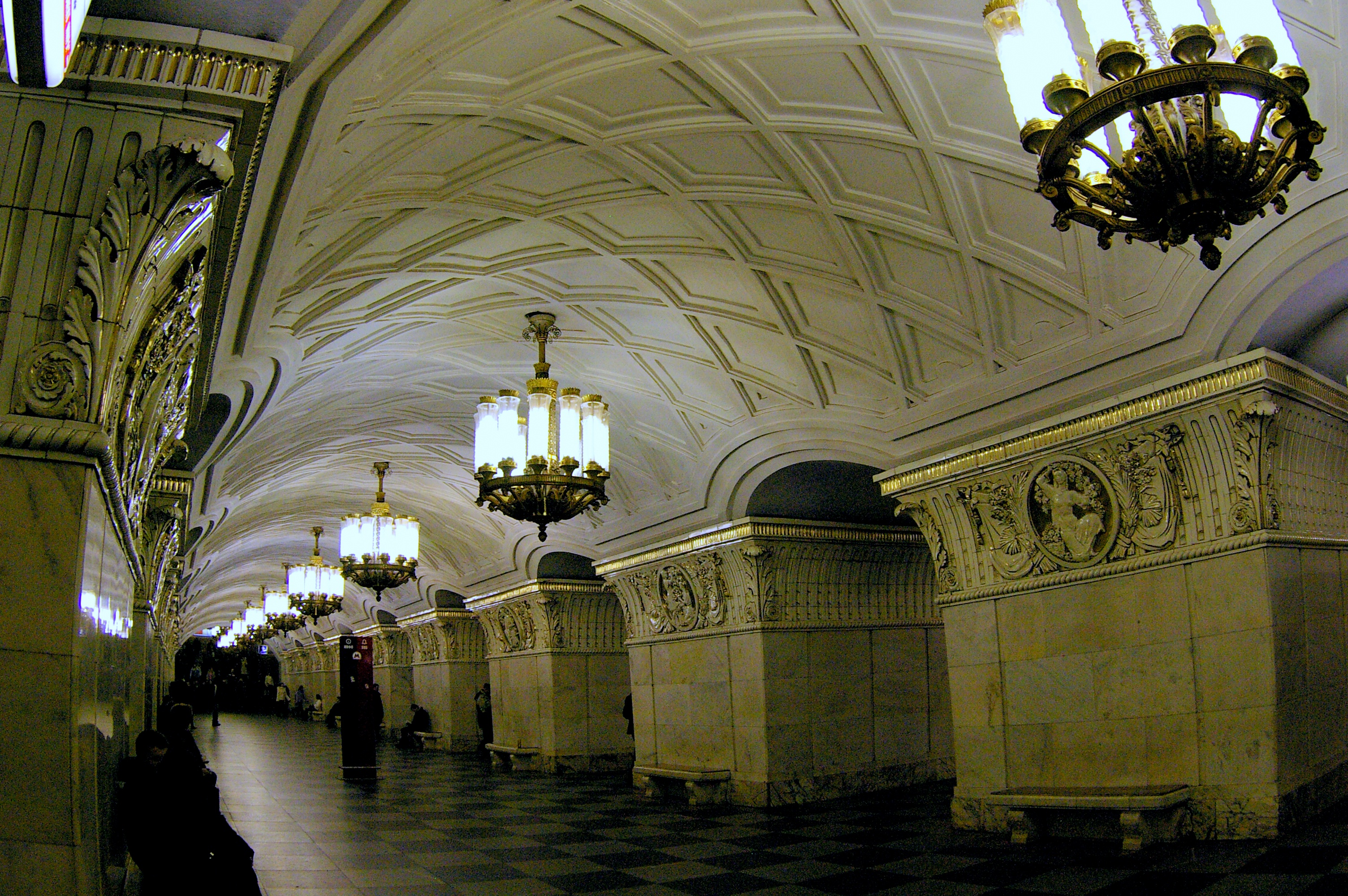
Prospekt Mira (Koltsevaya Line)

- Komsomolskaya (Line 1)
- Krasniye Vorota
- Kropotkinskaya
- Vorobyovy Gory
- Mayakovskaya
- Novokuznetskaya
- Avtozavodskaya
- Park Pobedy
- Kiyevskaya(Line 3)
- Arbatskaya (Line 3)
- Ploshchad Revolyutsii
- Elektrozavodskaya
- Taganskaya (Line 5)
- Komsomolskaya (Line 5)
- Prospekt Mira (Line 5)
- Novoslobodskaya
- Kiyevskaya (Line 5)
- Pushkinskaya
- Kuznetsky most
- Nagatinskaya

== Sights which do not exist ==
=== Destroyed or lost sights ===
- Rossiya Hotel (demolished in March 2006)
- Hotel Moskva (demolished in 2004; rebuild in 2014)
- Red Gate
- Sukharev Tower

=== Sights which were never built ===
- Palace of Soviets
- Pantheon, Moscow
- Tatlin's Tower
- Narkomtiazhprom
- Zaryadye Administrative Building
