= Osypenko =

Osypenko may refer to:

- Osypenko, Solone Raion, a village, Dnipropetrovsk Oblast, Ukraine
- Osypenko, Berdiansk Raion, a village, Zaporizhia Oblast, Ukraine
- Osypenko, Sevastopol, a village under the jurisdiction of the city of Sevastopol, Ukraine
- Osypenko, name of the town of Berdiansk, Ukraine, in 1939–1958
- Osypenko (surname)

== See also ==
- Osipenko (disambiguation)
