= Novokuznetsky =

Novokuznetsky (masculine), Novokuznetskaya (feminine), or Novokuznetskoye (neuter) may refer to:

- Novokuznetsky District, a district of Kemerovo Oblast, Russia
- Novokuznetsky Urban Okrug, a municipal formation in Kemerovo Oblast, which the city of Novokuznetsk is incorporated as
- Novokuznetskaya, a station of the Moscow Metro, Russia
