= Alexander Osipenko =

Alexander Osipenko may refer to:

- Alexander Osipenko (athlete) (born 1984), Russian ice hockey player.
- Alexander Osipenko (pilot) (1910–1991), Soviet military aviator
