= Osipenko =

Osipenko (Russian), Osypenko (Ukrainian), or Asipenka (Belarusian) may refer to:

== People ==
- Alexander Osipenko (1910–1991), Soviet Lieutenant-General
- Alla Osipenko (1932–2025), Russian ballerina
- Polina Osipenko (1907–1939), Soviet pilot, Hero of the Soviet Union
- Inna Osypenko (b. 1982), Ukrainian sprint canoer
- Dzmitry Asipenka (b. 1982), Belarusian soccer player

== Populated places in Ukraine ==
- Osypenko, Solone Raion, a village, Dnipropetrovsk Oblast, Ukraine
- Osypenko, Berdyansk Raion, a village, Zaporizhia Oblast, Ukraine
- Osypenko, Sevastopol, a village under the jurisdiction of the city of Sevastopol, Ukraine
- Osypenko, name of the town of Berdyansk, Ukraine, in 1939–1958

== See also ==
- Imeni Poliny Osipenko District, a district of Khabarovsk Krai, Russia
  - Imeni Poliny Osipenko (rural locality), a rural locality (a selo), the administrative center of that district
- Poliny Osipenko Street, name of Sadovnicheskaya Street, Moscow, Russia, in 1939–1991
