= Osypenko (surname) =

Osypenko or Osipenko (Ukrainian: Осипенко) is a Ukrainian surname derived from the given name Osyp, equivalent to English Joseph. Its Belarusian equivalent is Asipenka or Asipienka (Belarusian: Асіпенка).

Notable people with the surname include:

- Alexander Osipenko (disambiguation), multiple individuals
- Alla Osipenko (born 1932), Russian ballerina
- Dzmitry Asipenka (born 1982), Belarusian footballer
- Inna Osypenko-Radomska (born 1982), Ukrainian-Azerbaijani sprint kayaker
- Petro Osypenko (1921–unknown), Soviet-Ukrainian public prosecutor
- Polina Osipenko (1907–1939), Soviet-Ukrainian pilot
