= Sadovnicheskaya Street =

Street in Moscow, Russia

Coordinates: 55°44′31″N 37°38′23″E

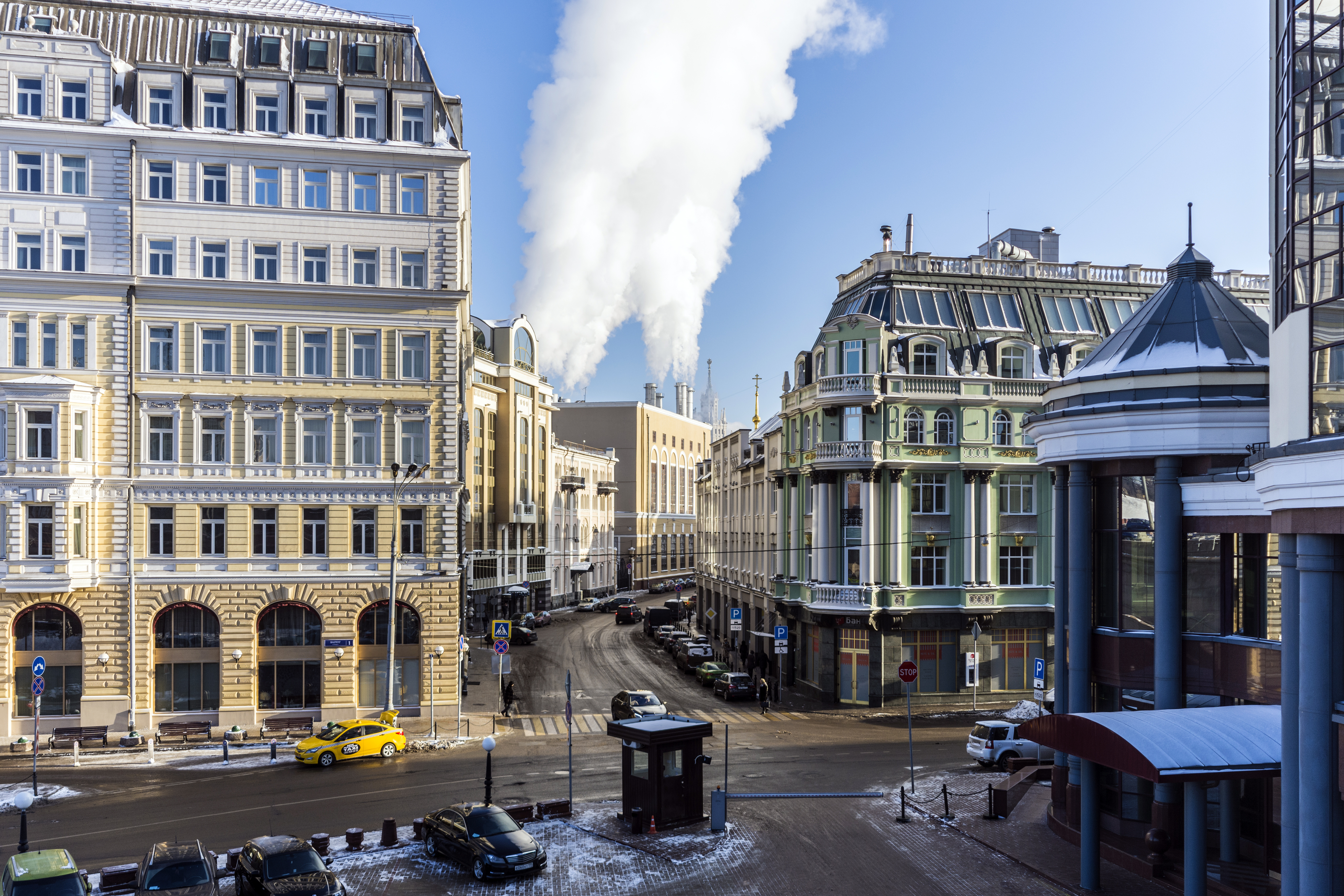
- View to Sadovnicheskaya street from Bolshoy Moskvoretsky Bridge
- Interactive map of Sadovnicheskaya Street
- Native name: Садовническая улица (Russian)
- Length: 2 km (1.2 mi)
- Location: Moscow; Central Administrative Okrug; Zamoskvorechye District
- Nearest metro station: Novokuznetskaya; Paveletskaya

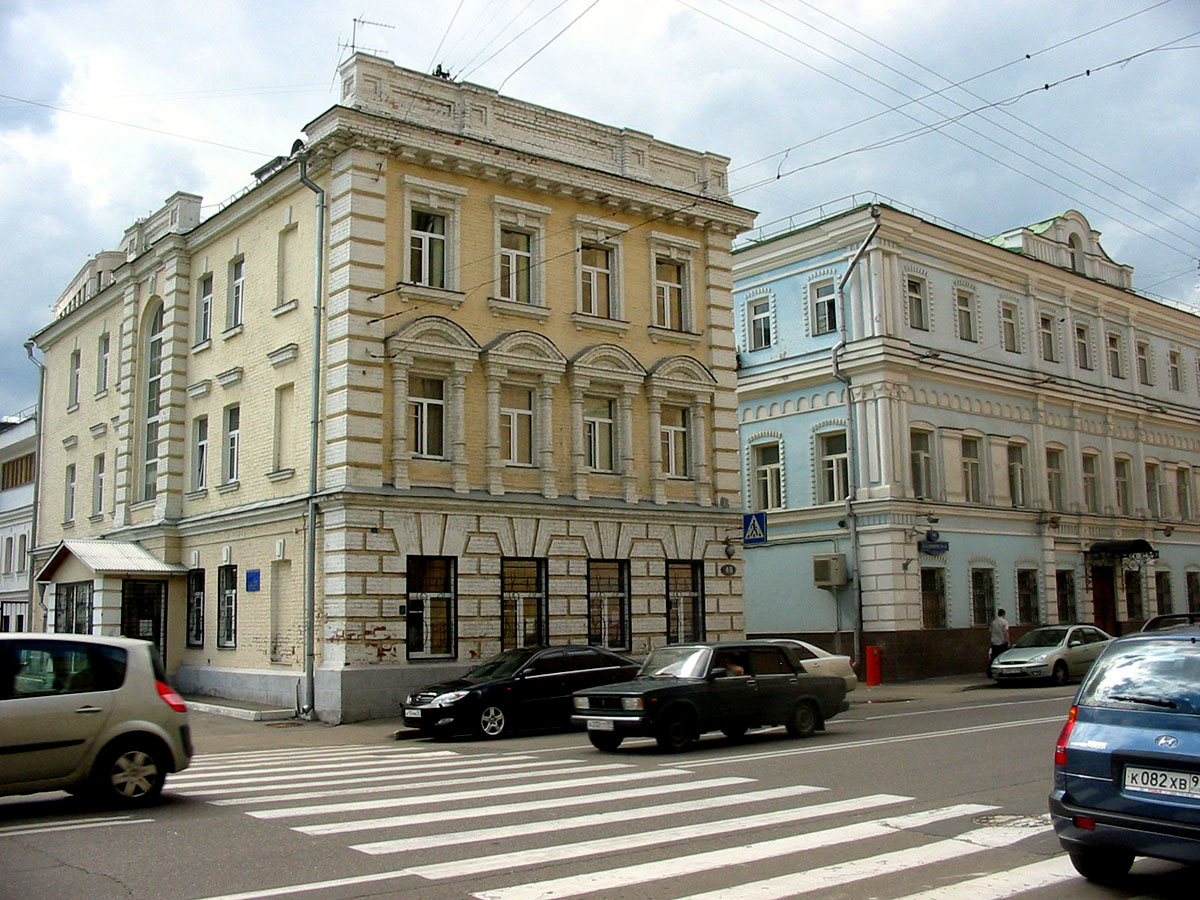
48 Sadovnicheskaya St., Gerschwin school of music

Sadovnicheskaya street (Russian: Садо́вническая у́лица, lit. Gardener's Street) is a street in the historical Zamoskvorechye District of Moscow, Russia, on a narrow island between Moskva River and the parallel old river bed (Vodootvodny Canal). The street runs from Balchug Street (across the Kremlin) south-east to the Garden Ring.

== History ==
Historical neighborhood of Sadovniki (lit. Gardener's) goes back to the 14th-century gardens of prince Vasili I of Russia. The garden itself was placed directly opposite the Kremlin and doubled as a fire barrier within a wooden city. Adjacent garden workers' settlement eventually gave name to Sadovniki and Sadovnicheskaya street. Other streets with the same name also existed in Moscow, but were eventually renamed. The remote district of Nagatino-Sadovniki was named in a similar manner, centuries later. Downtown Sadovniki remained a quiet, rural community. Annual floods and migrations of river bed through the floodlands discouraged capital construction. As if it wasn't enough, the southern suburbs were the first to be looted and burnt down during the enemy raids.

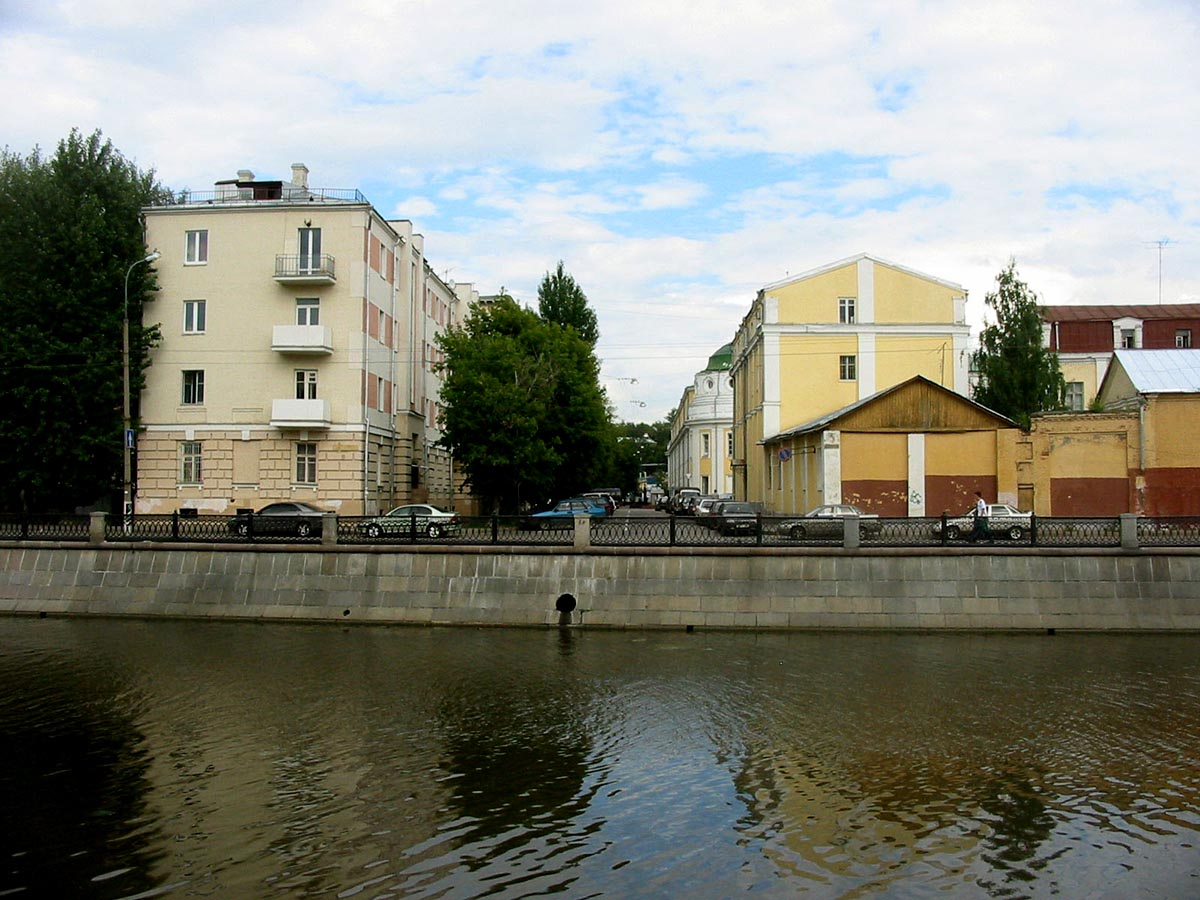
View from south, across the canal. KriegsKommissariat (green roof) visible in the distance

The neighborhood became an important construction site in late 18th century. By 1786, the old river bed was rebuilt into a permanent Canal; in 1778–1781, Niсholas Legrand builds the castle of New Kriegskomissariat (a military office and depot), now headquarters of Moscow Military District. Dams intended to control floods (1836) also raised river level, improving commercial shipping. They were imperfect and couldn't help in case of draught or flood: in 1908, Moskva River completely flooded the island (water level exceeded 7 meters above present-day summer average).

By the end of 19th century, Sadovniki became a working-class community. In 1880s, the street saw heavy industrial construction (first electrical powerplant, 1887, textile mills). Former warehouses and farms were built out to five-story residential houses and hotels.

== Modern times ==
Relatively few historical buildings were lost in the Soviet time. The classical three-story waterfront mansion (now at 43 Sadovnicheskaya), which was in the way of housing construction after World War II, was carefully lifted with hydraulic jacks and moved south to its present location. Grand Stalinist construction concentrated on the Moskva river front, while Sadovnicheskaya street (just a hundred meters south) remained mostly intact. An important late Constructivism landmark in Sadovniki is the Textile Institute, facing near the Ustinsky Bridge.

Electrical streetcar served the eastern part of the street from 1913 to 1963 (photo: existing streetcar line crosses the street).

In 1939, the street was renamed to Polina Osipenko Street, commemorating the death of a pilot Polina Osipenko. In 1991, Sadovnicheskaya was restored, while another Osipenko Street was created in distant Vnukovo district.

In 1967, a five-story house at the corner of Sadovnicheskaya and Garden ring (No.77) was destroyed by explosion. No reliable sources exist to the number of killed or the nature of a blast (either a gas pipe leak or WWII ammunition). The site stood vacant until 2006.

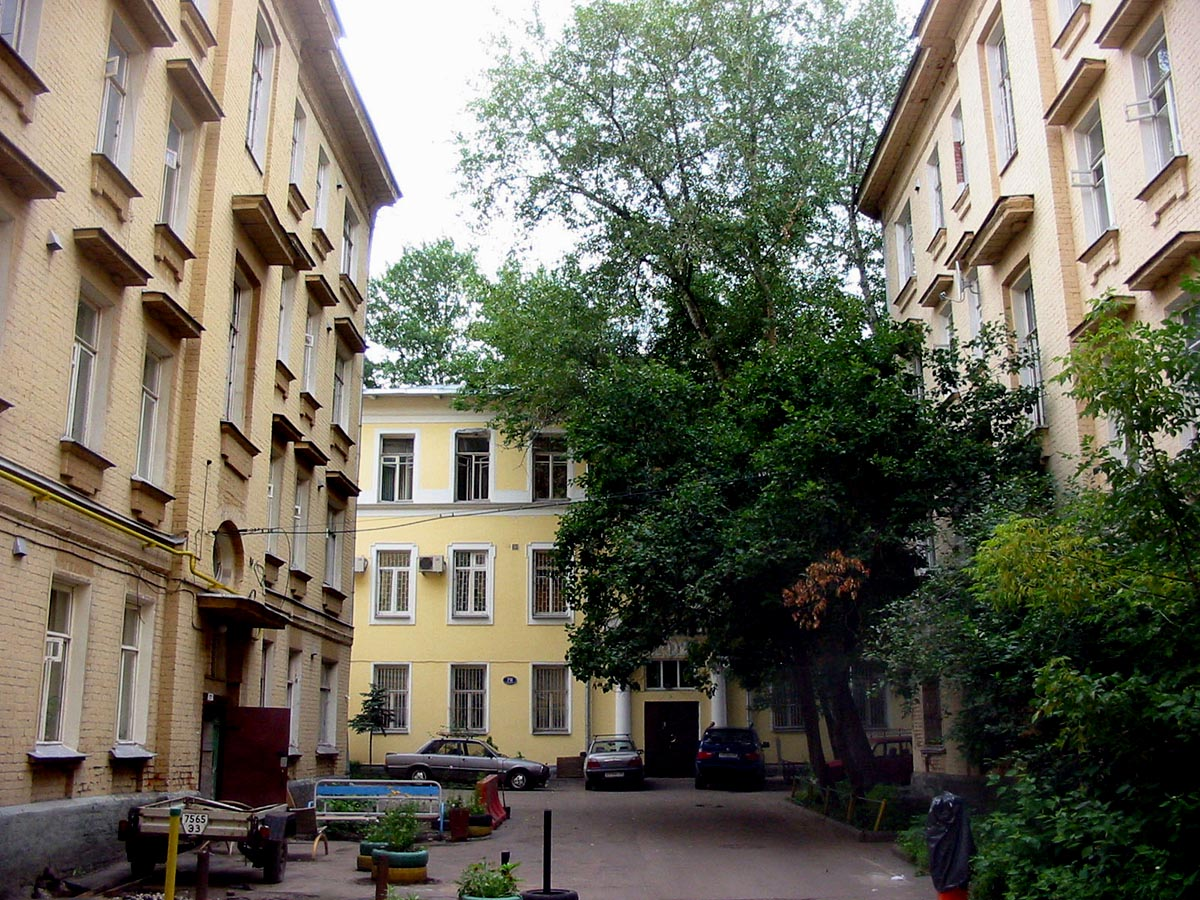
78 Sadovnicheskaya St., a quiet residential courtyard

Present-day street is clearly segmented into two halves separated by Bolshoy Ustinsky Bridge:

- Sadovniki West (including the Balchug street). The most densely built part of the island is almost all office space, uninhabited at night. Also houses Moscow's first electrical powerplant (still active); offices are traditionally occupied by electrical (Mosenergo) and oil companies.
- Sadovniki East. A mixed residential, educational and industrial neighborhood, Sadovniki East retained most of the traditional Zamoskvorechye air. Recent wave of development replaced the old textile mill with a block-sized office compound. Adjacent block (near Zverev Bridge) was condemned for redevelopment, residents evicted in 2004, but no work ever started. Other than that, 19th-century architecture remains remarkably well preserved. Military still controls sizeable properties in eastern part, which probably explains the preservation of social and architectural diversity here.

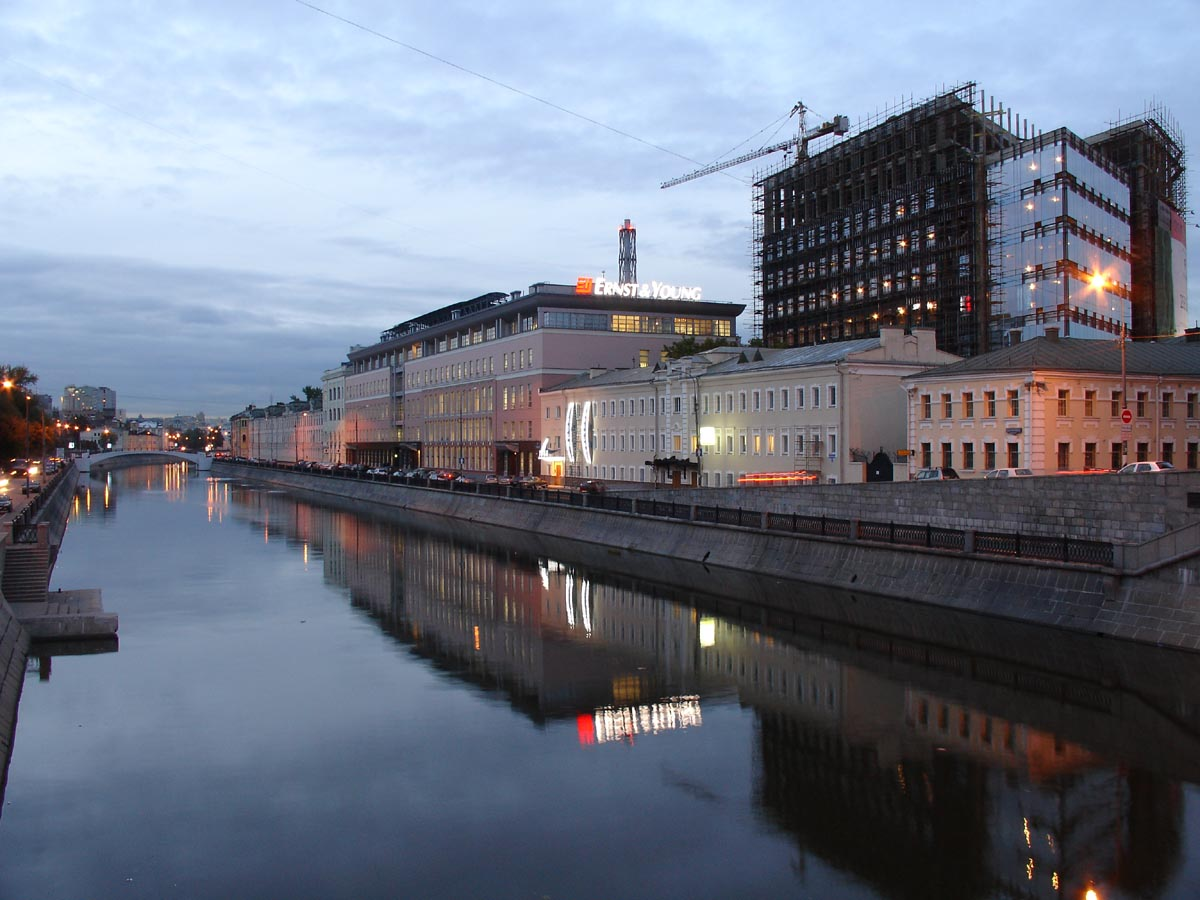
Site of textile mill, rebuilt to office space - eastern tip of Sadovniki

== Notable educational and cultural facilities ==
- Church of St.Nicholas (1759), 1st Raushsky 1
- Church of St.George (1653), Sadovnicheskaya, 8
- University of Design and Technology (former Textile Institute), Sadovnicheskaya, 33
- School 518, the only listed postconstructivist memorial building in Moscow
- Gerschwin school of music - Sadovnicheskaya, 48
- Moscow International House of Music - located across the Garden Ring
- Maimonides Academy, Sadovnicheskaya, 52/45

== Subway and railroad access ==
- Paveletskaya-Radialnaya, Paveletskaya-Koltsevaya, Paveletsky Terminal - Sadovniki east
- Tretyakovskaya, Novokuznetskaya - Sadovniki west, east via Zverev Bridge

Also within 20 minutes walk from Kitay-Gorod, Taganskaya-Radialnaya, Taganskaya-Koltsevaya.
