= Alexander Osipenko (athlete) =

Russian ice hockey player

- Born: December 29, 1984 (age 41) Moscow, Russia
- Height: 6 ft 1 in (185 cm)
- Weight: 176 lb (80 kg; 12 st 8 lb)
- Position: Forward
- Shoots: Right
- KHL team Former teams: HC Spartak Moscow; HC Vityaz Podolsk
- NHL draft: Undrafted
- Playing career: 2005–present

Alexander Osipenko (Осипенко, Александр Викторович; born December 29, 1984) is a Russian ice hockey player. He is currently playing with HC Spartak Moscow of the Kontinental Hockey League (KHL).

Osipenko made his Kontinental Hockey League (KHL) debut playing with HC Vityaz Podolsk during the 2009–10 KHL season.
