= Church of the Transfiguration of the Savior in Bolvanovka =

Church in Moscow, Russia

Coordinates: 55°44′4″N 37°37′53″E

Church of Transfiguration of Savior in Bolvanovka
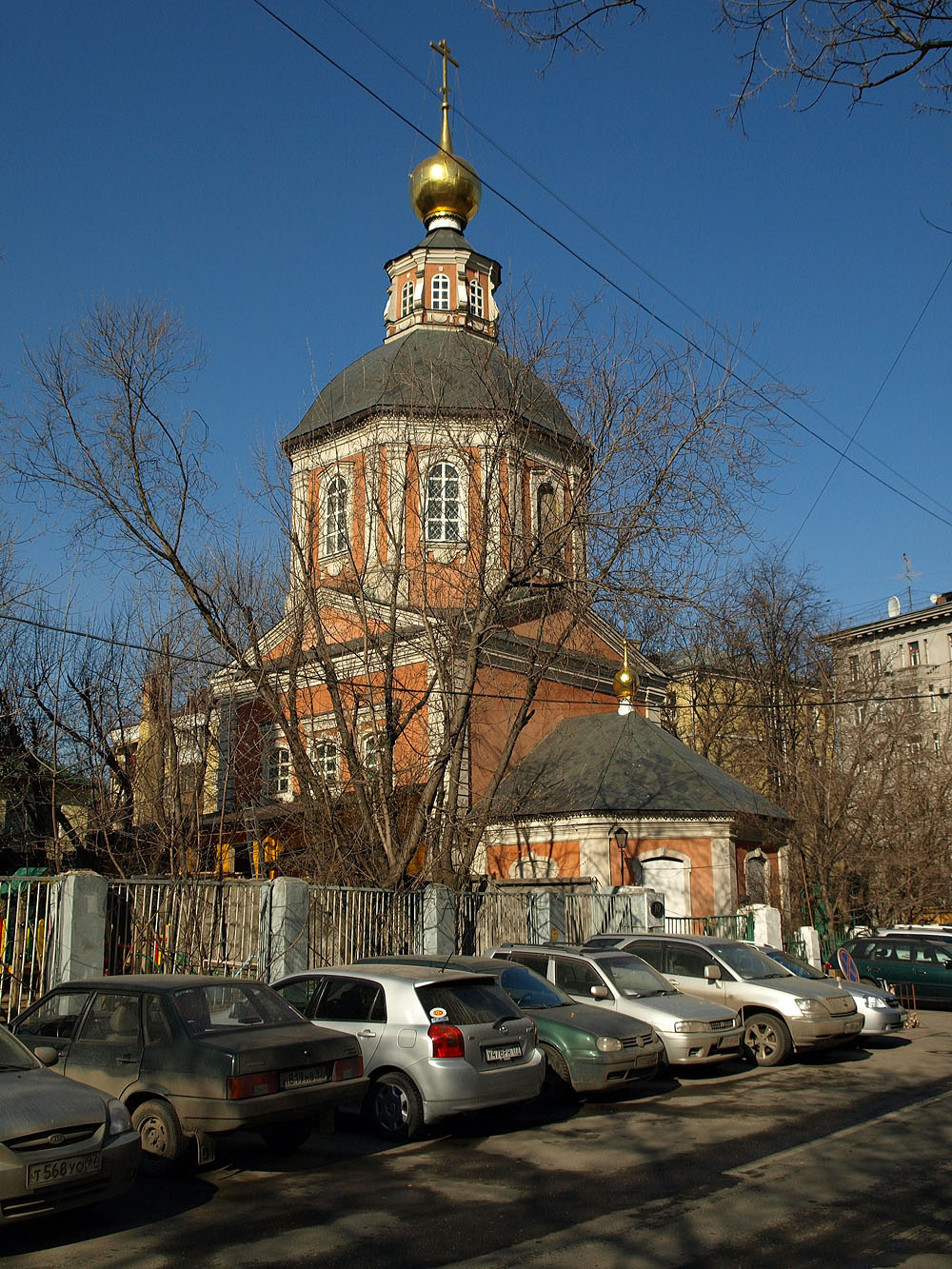
- Храм Спаса Преображения на Болвановке
- Interactive map of the Church of Transfiguration of Savior in Bolvanovka area

General information
- Architectural style: Baroque
- Location: 10, Second Novokuznetsky Lane, Moscow, Russia
- Completed: 1755 (disputed)

Technical details
- Structural system: Masonry

Church of Transfiguration of Savior in Bolvanovka (Russian: Храм Спаса Преображения на Болвановке), also abbreviated to Saviour in Bolvanovka (Спас на Болвановке), is an Orthodox church in Zamoskvorechye District of Moscow.

The neighborhood, Bolvanovka (rus. Болвановка), derives its name from Russian bolvan (болван), which could mean either a billet or, in obsolete sense, a non-Orthodox cult image. There have different Bolvanovka neighborhoods in medieval Moscow, a sign of wide Tatar presence (e.g. near Taganka Square).

== History ==
A legend says that the church stands on site of a Tatar bolvan, an artifact which symbolized submission of Moscow to Golden Horde. Ivan III of Russia destroyed this symbol (or broke ambassador symbol - basma (басма), that has the same name) and established an Orthodox church at this place in 1465. His refusal to pay tribute to the Horde resulted in the Great stand on the Ugra river of 1480. A wooden church had been mentioned in city records since 1465.

The new baroque building was built in the 18th century; completion date is disputed (1722 or later); what is known definitely is that the church was consecrated in 1755. Alternative accounts assert that there was a succession of wooden churches built in 1708 and 1722; extant building that replaced them was built in 1749–1755.

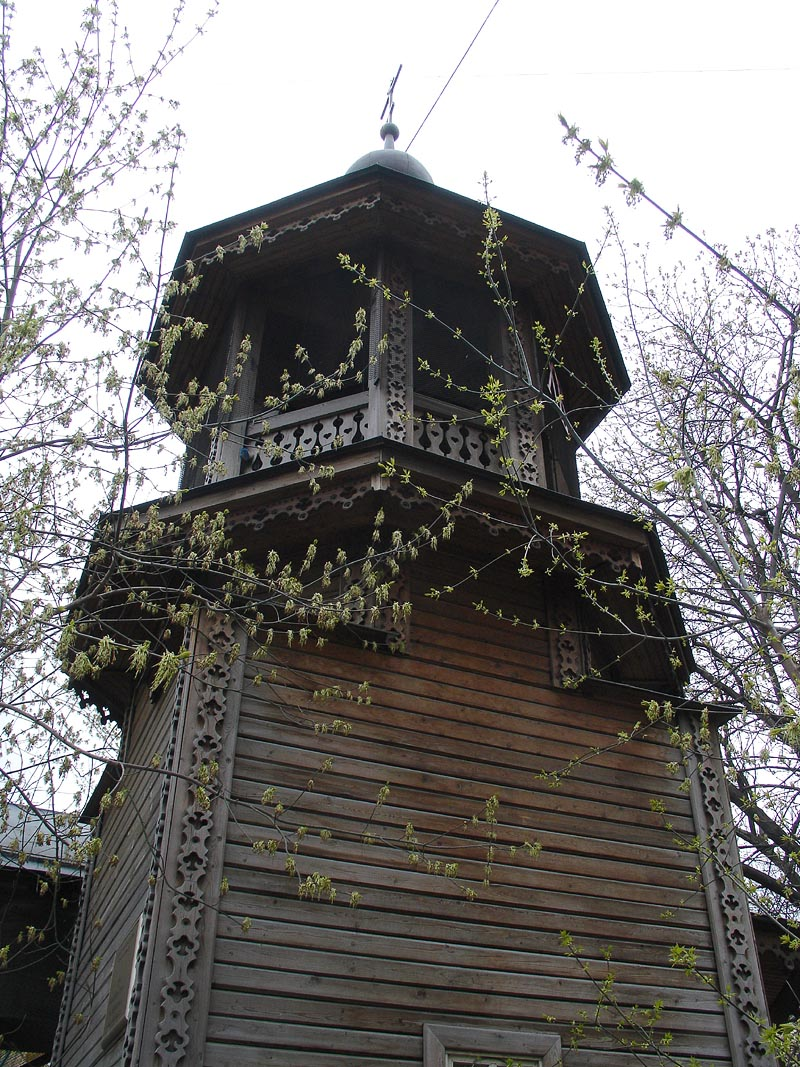
Temporary wooden belltower was built in 1990s

The church burnt down in the Fire of Moscow (1812) and was reopened to worshippers in 1815 with subsequent expansion in 1839. It was closed by Bolsheviks in 1922, partially destroyed, and returned to the worshippers in 1991. A temporary, standalone wooden belltower was added in the 1990s.
