= Zamoskvorechye District =

District of Moscow

Coordinates: 55°44′23″N 37°37′30″E

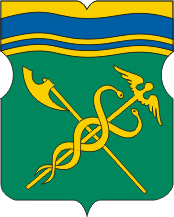
Coat of arms of Zamoskvorechye District

Zamoskvorechye District on the map of Moscow

Zamoskvorechye District (Russian: райо́н Замоскворе́чье) is a district in the Central Administrative Okrug of Moscow, Russia. It is a historic area notable for its eclectic architectural character, provincial atmosphere, and its many churches.

== Etymology ==
Zamoskvorechye comes from the place name, Zarechye, meaning "beyond the Moskva river". This refers to the geographical location of the district which is on the right side of the river, south of the Kremlin.

== Location ==
The Zamoskvorechye administrative district is located in inner south Moscow, abutting the right bank of the Moskva. It is transected by the Garden Ring road. The district covers the eastern half of the historical neighbourhood of the same name. It also covers the Zatsepa Street neighbourhood, and the Moscow Paveletsky railway station.

== History ==
=== Old Muscovy ===
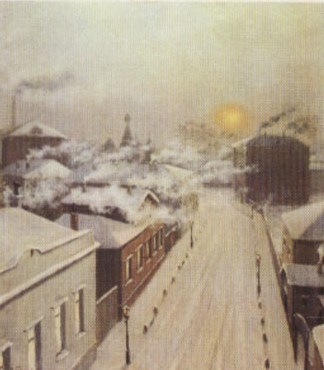
Zamoskvorechye, the late 19th century

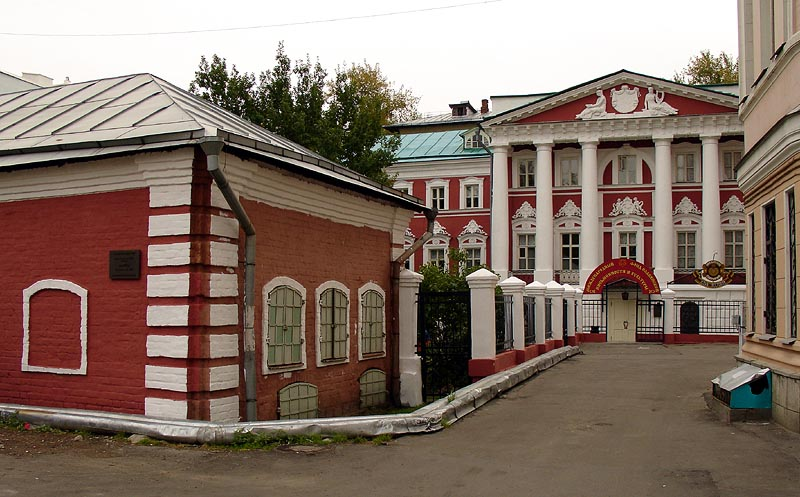
17th century chambers, left, 18th century mansion, right, in Chernigovsky Lane

The district first appeared in the 13th century as a village near Moscow. The villagers were merchants and archers. The district was built around the high roads leading to two bridges over the Moskva from Kaluga and Serpukhov lying to the south. The main road from Moscow to the Golden Horde region (now Bolshaya Ordynka street and Serpukhov road) ran through the district.

Regular floods and the north–south migration of Moskva river bed limited construction to a narrow, 500–700 meter wide strip of land between the Ordynka and Tatarskaya streets. The development of Zamoskvorechye first followed the eastward expansion of the city on the northern bank; thus, eastern Zamoskvorechye is younger than the western Yakimanka District. For example, present-day Pyatnitskaya Street emerged early in the 15th century, when the expansion of the Moscow Kremlin moved the wooden Bolshoy Moskvoretsky Bridge one block eastward.

Between 1591 and 1592, during the reign of Feodor I, a fortified wall was built at the line of the present-day Garden Ring. Within the wall, there was a sloboda, an urban village with some autonomy of governance, where soldiers, craftsmen and foreigners lived in separate areas.

Royal garden attendants (садовники, sadovniki) lived near Balchug Street and the early Sadovnicheskaya Street from 1495 until the fire of 1701. The fellmongers (oвчинники, ovchinniki) settled in the early Pyatnitskaya Street area and gave the name of their trade to the Ovchinnikovsky Lanes. The Royal mint workers (монетчики, monetchiki) settled in the southern end of the neighborhood on Pyatnitskaya Street (Monetchikovsky Lanes).

Vishnyakovsky Lane is named after Streltsy troops living in that area who were under the command of colonel Veshniakov. Tatarskaya Street is named after the Tatar community who remain in the area. The Tolmachevsky Lanes are named after the court translators (толмачи, tolmachi, German: Dolmetscher) who lived in that area.

=== 18th century ===
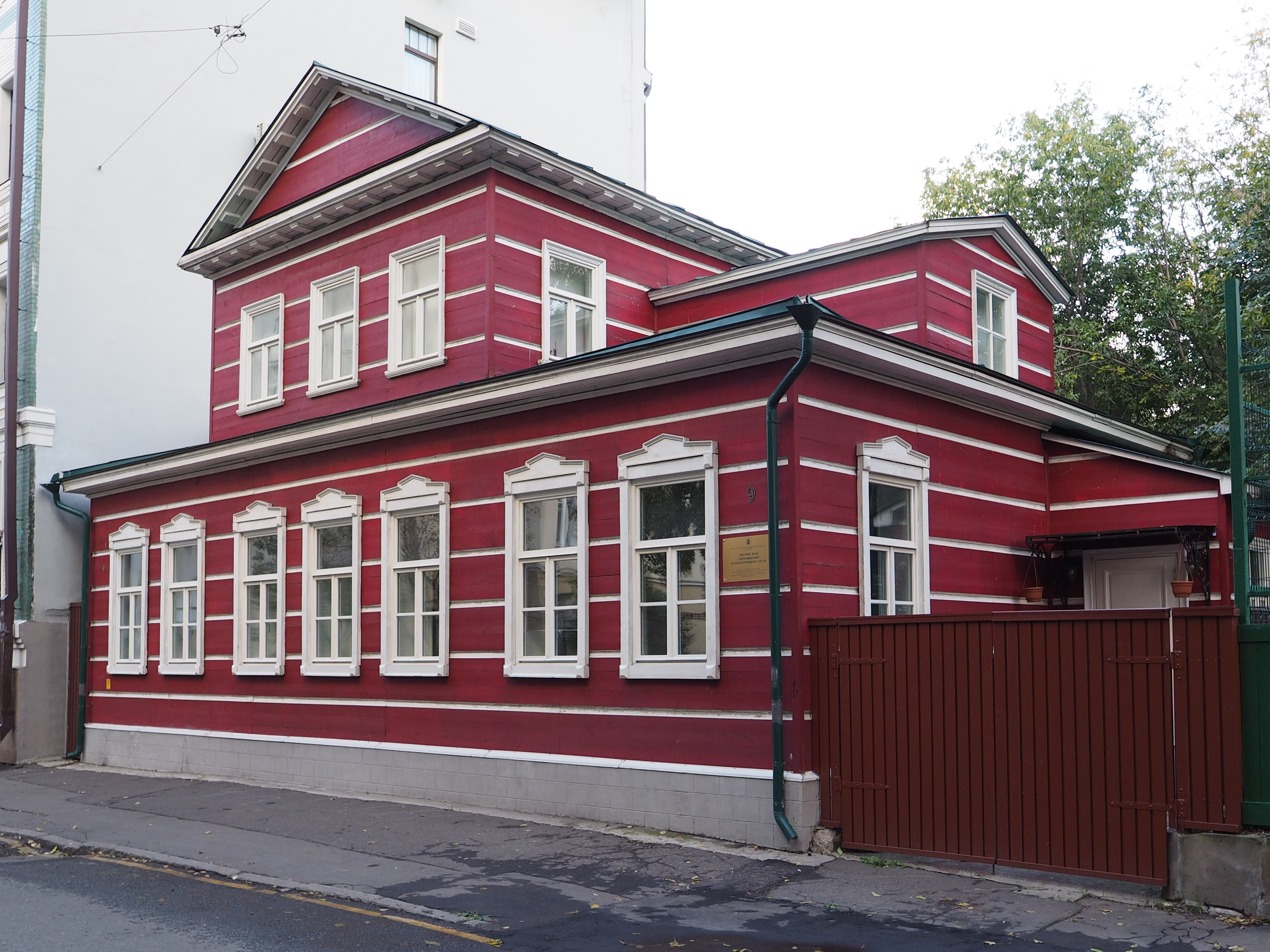
Traditional wooden house, Golikovsky Lane

The sloboda community was markedly disrupted in the early 18th century. In the 1690s, an uprising against Petrine reforms led to the arrest and execution of many Moscow Streltsy troops. In 1713, the royal court moved to Saint Petersburg and craftsmen lost their customers.

The district was gradually re-settled by farmers and merchants. The wealthier class of conservative businessmen concentrated in Pyatnitskaya and Ordynka streets. Zamoskvorechye became a quiet, spacious neighbourhood of single-story houses and new churches such as the Church of the Savior on Bolvany founded in 1755.

In 1782, Catherine II divided Moscow into 20 police districts. Zamoskvorechye and Yakimanka became separate districts. After Moscow flooded in 1783, the city built the Vodootvodny Canal, thus creating a new island following the bend of the Moskva river to reduce ongoing flood risk and the north and southward movement of the river course. Large areas east of the Tatarskaya streets were flooded to create a river harbour and a fortified grain port. The developments did not eventuate and in the 1820s the flooded land was reclaimed for use as pastures and gardens. The New Kriegskomissariat fort at the east of the island represented a continuing police presence.

=== 19th century ===
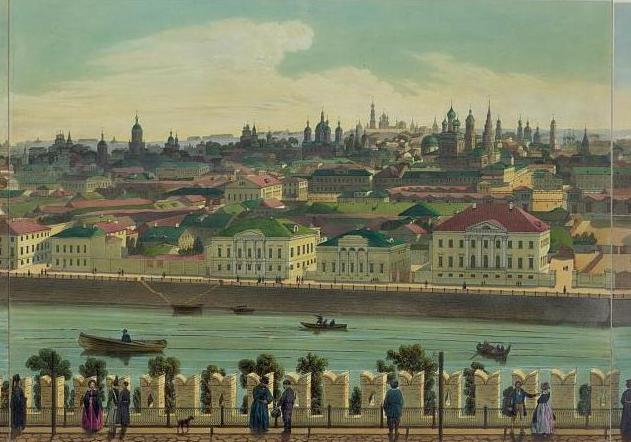
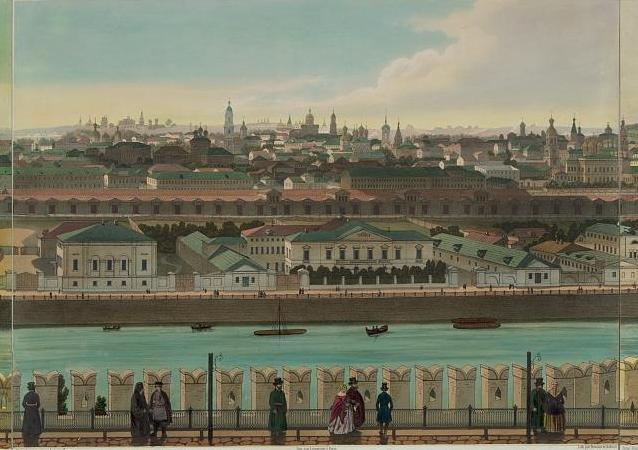
View from the Kremlin by Benoist et Aubrun (mid-19th century)

Construction of Babiegorodskaya Dam and the clearing of the Vodootvodny Canal in the 1830s reduced the flood hazard, but the surrounding land remained cheap. This led to industrialization of Zamoskvorechye, starting with small home-based factories continuing sloboda traditions.

Soon after the Emancipation reform of 1861, vacant lots in Sadovniki and Tatarskaya Streets became sites of a variety of small industry. Construction of the Pererva and Kolomna dams between 1874 and 1877 aimed to improve shipping but at this time, transport by rail was preferred.

In 1857, English brothers Theodore and Edward Bromley founded a small hand tools manufacturing business south of the Garden Ring. The business grew and by 1917, the brothers had established a number of plumbing and railroad fixture factories around the around the Paveletsky railroad. The Smirnoff Distillary was established at the intersection of Pyatnitskaya street and the canal in 1862. The MOGES-1 power station was built in Sadovniki in 1896.

The Paveletsky Rail Terminal (Ryazan-Ural Railroad Terminal or Saratov terminal) was completed in 1900 leading to rapid industrial expansion south of Garden Ring. A plan to continue the railway to Boloto Square near the canal opposite the Kremlin did not come to fruition.

=== Modern history ===
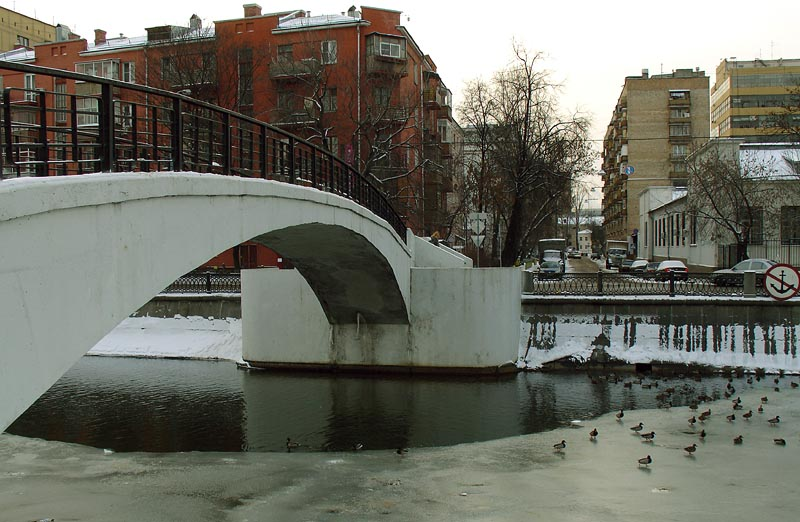
Zverev Bridge. The place stands unchanged since the 1920s; see 1930s photo

In 1922, the Bolsheviks looted and closed 22 churches in Zamoskvorechye and Yakimanka. Eventually, only one functioning church was left in each district. In addition to institutional chapels, 17 religious buildings remained standing including the Old Believers Church of Novozybkov Bespopovtsy and the Historique Mosque established in 1823.

Housing construction, mostly large Soviet constructivist apartment blocks, proceeded slowly in the 1920s.

A 1935 Moscow master plan directed the completion of the Boulevard Ring through Zamoskvorechye. A thin line of Stalinist buildings near the Bolshoy Ustinsky Bridge is a local remnant of this unfinished project. Other Stalinist buildings were built near the Garden Ring and the embankments which were reinforced with granite facing. Bridges from the district to central Moscow were widened.

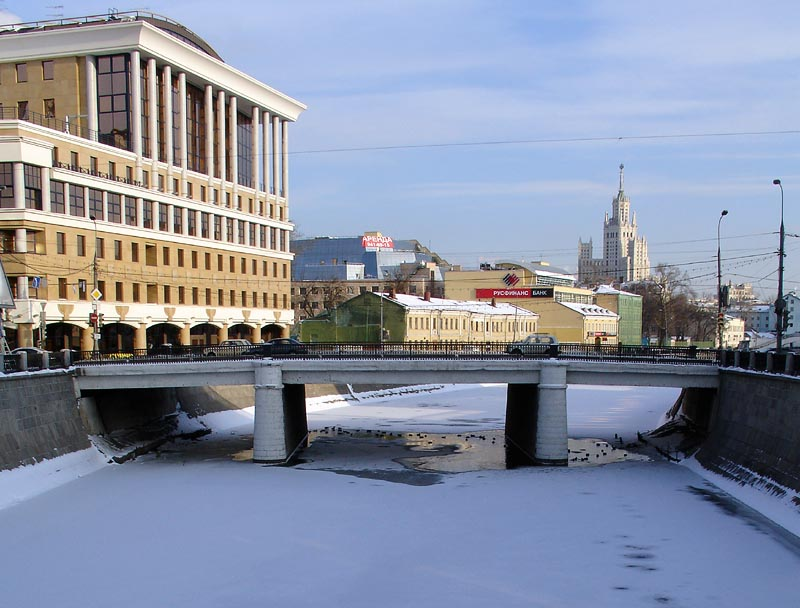
Modern offices in Balchug. A typical façadist structure in the background (with red-black billboard)

In 1941, in World War II the Twelfth Militia Division of Kirovsky District (дивизия народного ополчения Кировского района), later called the 139th Rifle Division, was raised with men from Zamoskvorechye and fought at the Yelnya offensive and at the Mozhaisk Defense Line.

The 1960s and 70s brought modern building methods (large-panel-system building) to Zamoskvorechye. Also called a plattenba, one of these projects was a filming location of Ivan Vasilievich: Back to the Future (1973). In the 1990s and 2000s, tower block construction occurred with facadist preservation of the old two-story buildings. Some local inhabitants had to leave the area.

== Notable buildings, cultural and educational facilities ==
=== Museums ===
- Bakhrushin Theatre Museum (1896)
- Paveletsky Rail Terminal Vladimir Lenin Memorial Train.
- Tretyakov Gallery, Yakimanka District.

=== Churches ===
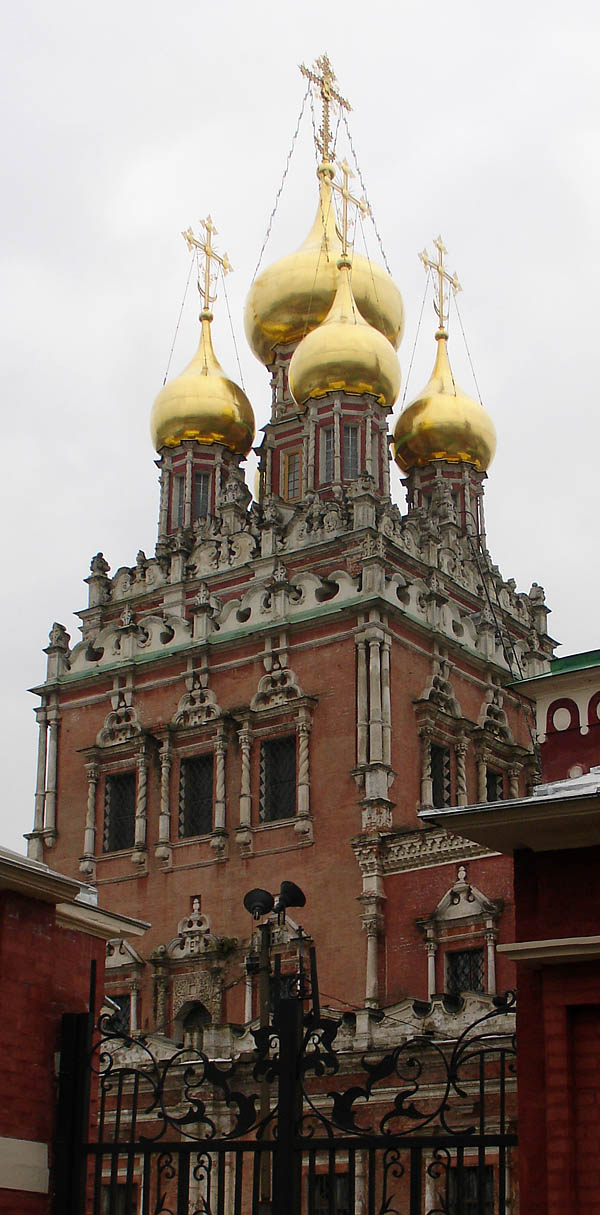
The Kadashi Church is a delightful example of Naryshkin Baroque

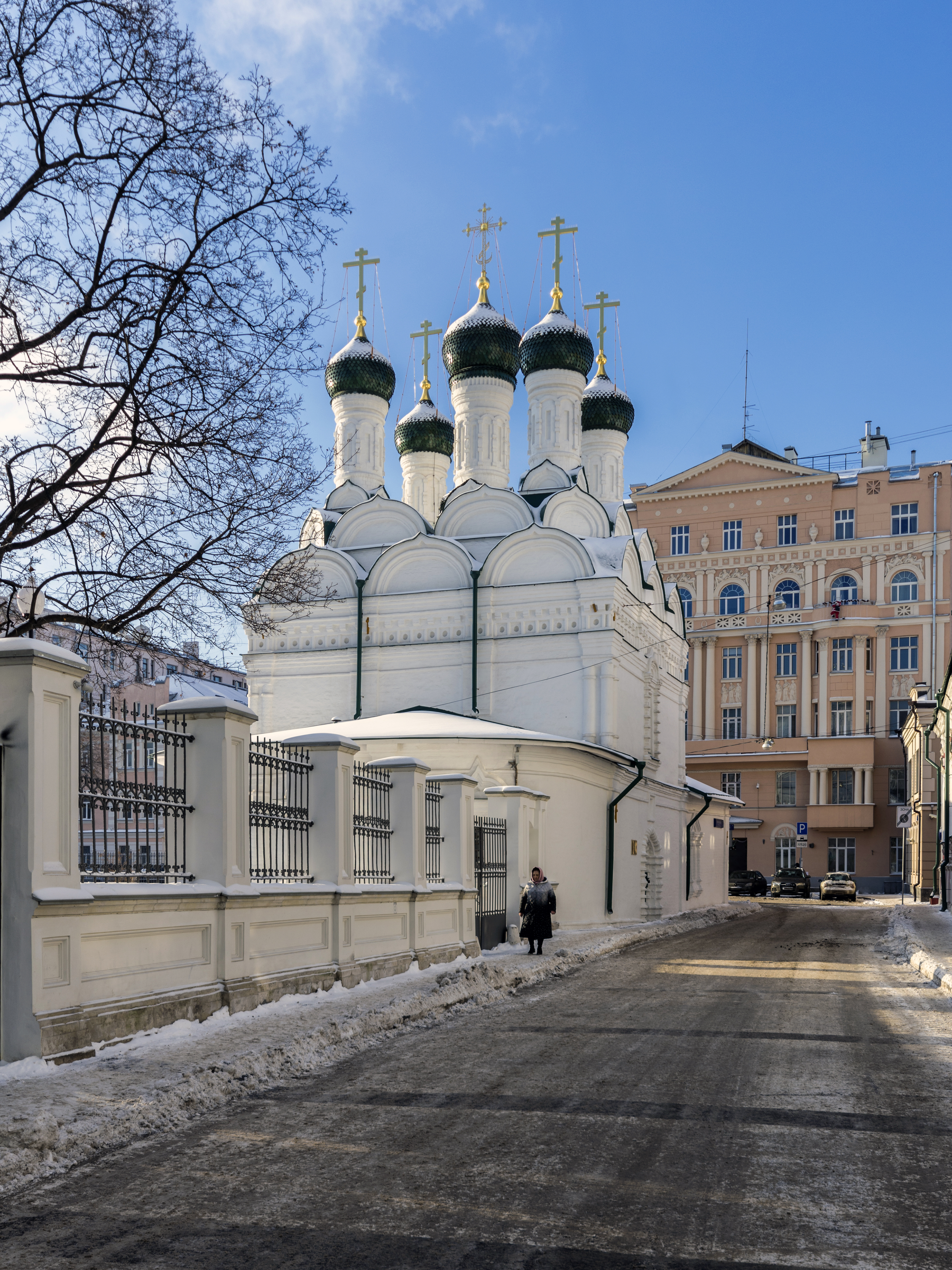
Church of Saints Mikhail and Fyodor, Martyrs of Chernigov

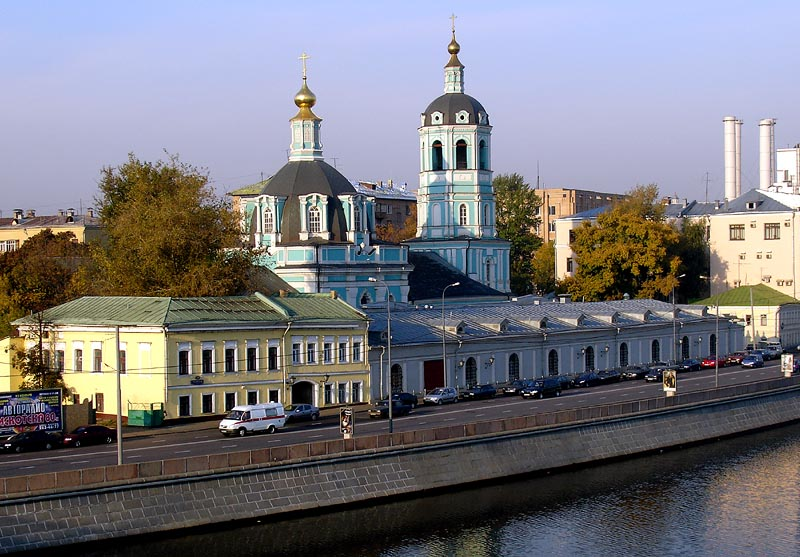
Baroque church of Saint Nicholas in Zayaitskoye (1741–1759, attributed to architect Ivan Michurin). Compare to 1882 photograph.

- Church of Beheading of John the Baptist (18th century), Pyatnitskaya, 4
- Church of St. George in Yendova (1653), Sadovnicheskaya Street, 6
- Church of Resurrection behind Serpukhov Gates (1762), Bolshaya Serpukhovskaya, 24
- Church of Iberian Theotokos in Vspolye (1791–1802), Bolshaya Ordynka, 39
- Church of Icon of Theotokos the Mother of the Dead, Zatsepa, 41
- Church of Icon of Theotokos the Mother of Joy in Sorrow, Bolshaya Serpukhovskaya, 31–4
- Church of Intercession of Theotokos, Novokuznetskayam 38–1, of Old Believers Russian Old-Orthodox Church
- Church of life-giving Trinity in Vishnyaki (1824–1826, architect: Afanasy Grigoriev), Pyatnitskaya, 51
- Church of Archangel Michael in Ovchinniki, Sredny Ovchinnikovsky, 7
- Church of Saint Clement, Pope of Rome, Pyatnitskaya, 26/7
- Church of Saints Mikhail and Fyodor, Martyrs of Chernigov (1675), Chernigovsky, 3. Named for two martyrs slain when they would not renounce their Christian faith
- Church of Saint Martyrs Frol and Lavr in Zatsepa (1778), Dubininskaya, 9/3
- Church of Saint Nicholas in Zayaitskoye (1741–1759, attributed to architect Ivan Michurin, Second Raushsky, 1-3
- Church of Saint Nicholas in Kuznetskaya and Church of Saint Vladimir, Vishnyakovsky, 15
- Church of Saint Nicholas in Pyzhi, Bolshaya Ordynka, 27
- Church of Transfiguration of Savior in Bolvanovka (1755, disputed), Second Novokuznetsky, 10

=== Theaters ===
- Moscow International House of Music in Red Hills
- Maly Theater, second stage (built in 1915 as Struisky Theater), Bolshaya Ordynka, 69
- Teatr Luny (Театр Луны), Malaya Ordynka, 31

=== Listed memorial buildings ===
- 18th - early 19th century buildings in Pyatnitskaya Street (Nn. 18, 19, 31, 44, 46, 67 etc.)
- 18th - early 19th century buildings in Bolshaya Ordynka Street (Nn. 21, 41, 45 etc.)
- 19th century housing and military institutions in Sadovnicheskaya Street (Nn. 57, 59 etc.)
- 19th century buildings in Novokuznetskaya Street (Nn. 28, 29, 31 etc.)
- New Kriegskomissariat, Kosmodamianskaya, 24-26 and adjacent historical buildings (Nn. 28)
- School 518 (1935), the only listed postconstructivism memorial building

== Public transportation access ==
Moscow Metro:

- Novokuznetskaya, Tretyakovskaya - north and center
- Dobryninskaya, Serpukhovskaya - south-west
- Paveletskaya-Radialnaya, Paveletskaya-Koltsevaya - south-east
- Tulskaya - southern extremity
