= Paveletskaya (Zamoskvoretskaya line) =

Moscow Metro station

Paveletskaya Павелецкая
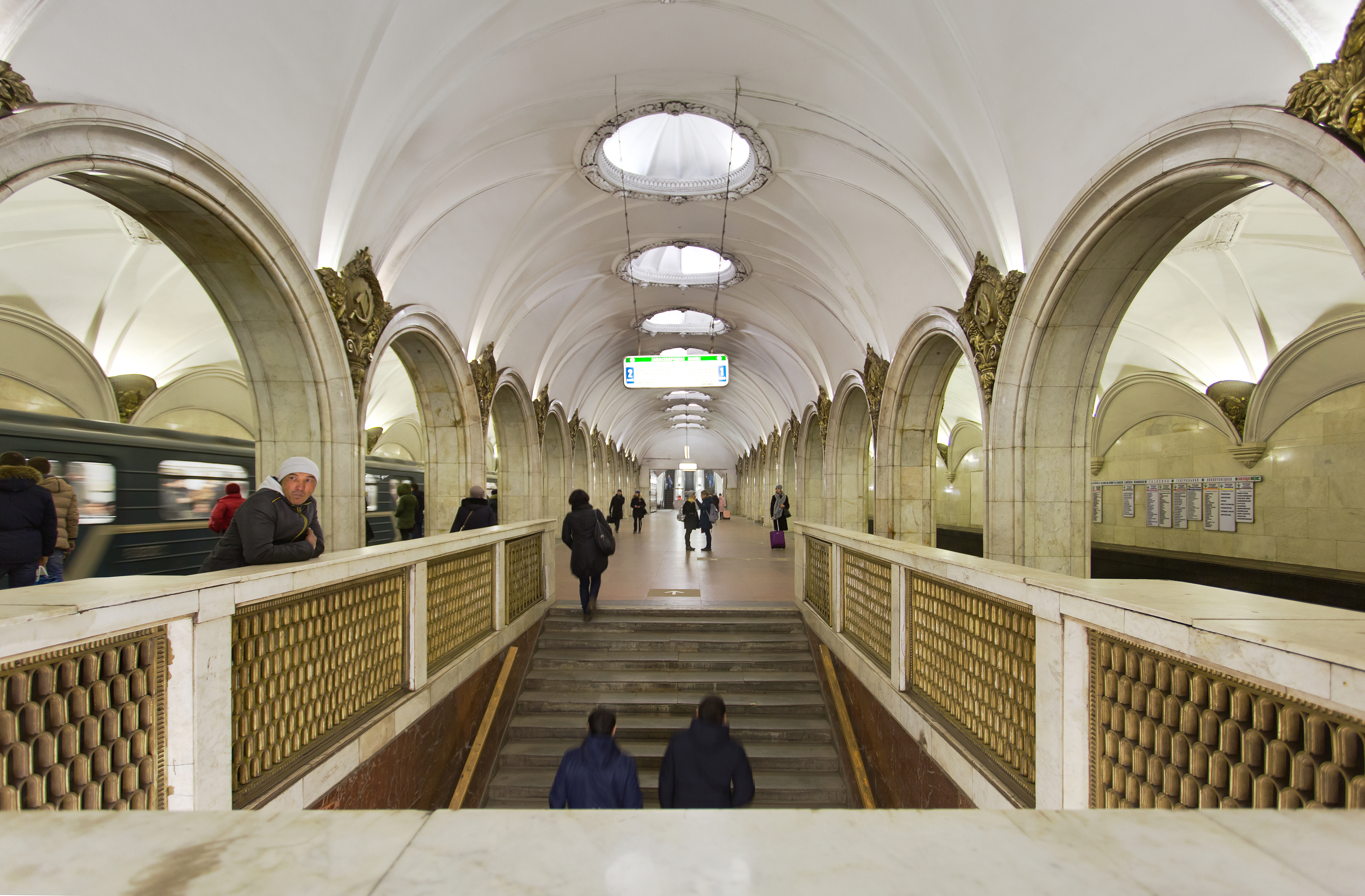

General information
- Location: Zamoskvorechye District; Central Administrative Okrug; Moscow; Russia
- Coordinates: 55.7305°N 37.6377°E
- System: Moscow Metro station
- Owner: Moskovsky Metropoliten
- Line: Zamoskvoretskaya line
- Platforms: 1 island platform
- Tracks: 2
- Connections: Tram: A, 3, 38, 39; Bus: Б (along the Garden ring), 913, с920, с932. Night routes: н8.

Construction
- Structure type: Pylon station
- Depth: 33.5 metres (110 ft)
- Platform levels: 1
- Parking: No

Other information
- Station code: 030

History
- Opened: 20 November 1943; 82 years ago

Passengers
- 2002: 19,220,900

Services
| Preceding station | Moscow Metro | Following station |
|---|---|---|
| Novokuznetskaya towards Khovrino | Zamoskvoretskaya line | Avtozavodskaya towards Alma-Atinskaya |
| Taganskaya anticlockwise / outer | Koltsevaya line transfer at Paveletskaya | Dobryninskaya clockwise / inner |
Route map
Location
- Location within Central Moscow

Paveletskaya (Russian: Павелецкая) is a Moscow Metro station on the Zamoskvoretskaya line, located in the Zamoskvorechye District, Central Administrative Okrug. The station has entrances to the Paveletsky rail terminal and the Garden ring. It was opened in 1943 and was designed by S.V. Lyashchenko and E.S. Demchenko. Paveletskaya features tall white marble pillars decorated with the hammer and sickle and a high, arched ceiling. The walls are faced with white marble.

== Construction history ==
The long run between Teatralnaya (then Ploshchad Sverdlova, opened in 1938) and Avtozavodskaya was opened January 1, 1943. Work on Novokuznetskaya and Paveletskaya continued throughout 1943, and these two stations were opened 20 November 1943. Novokuznetskaya was commissioned as a completed station (most of its 1943 interiors surviving to date); Paveletskaya was built to a design by Alexey Dushkin as a temporary deep (33.5 meters underground) pylon station of London type - with two side platforms, but without a central hall.

Work on converting Paveletskaya to a fully functional station commenced in 1950; the station was reopened February 21, 1953. Fragments of original pylons were retained in the southern end of the station; the rest was expanded to a spacious column type hall of the same structure as Mayakovskaya. Bronze-coloured inserts with hammer and sickle motive, the sole example of figurative art in this station, were actually painted ceramic castings.

== Accidents ==
- On 20 April 1987, at 19:55 local time, fire erupted in a northbound train approaching Paveletskaya. The train reached Paveletskaya, all passengers disembarked safely (the sole injury was a subway worker hospitalized with smoke poisoning). However, the train burnt out completely, damaging the interiors in the southern end on the station. It had to be partially rebuilt again.
- On 6 February 2004, at 08:40 local time, 40 passengers were killed in a terrorist attack on a train that left Avtozavodskaya for Paveletskaya.
- On 15 January 2007, both Paveletskaya stations were evacuated due to a fire in the tunnel connecting them. No injuries were reported.

== Transfers ==
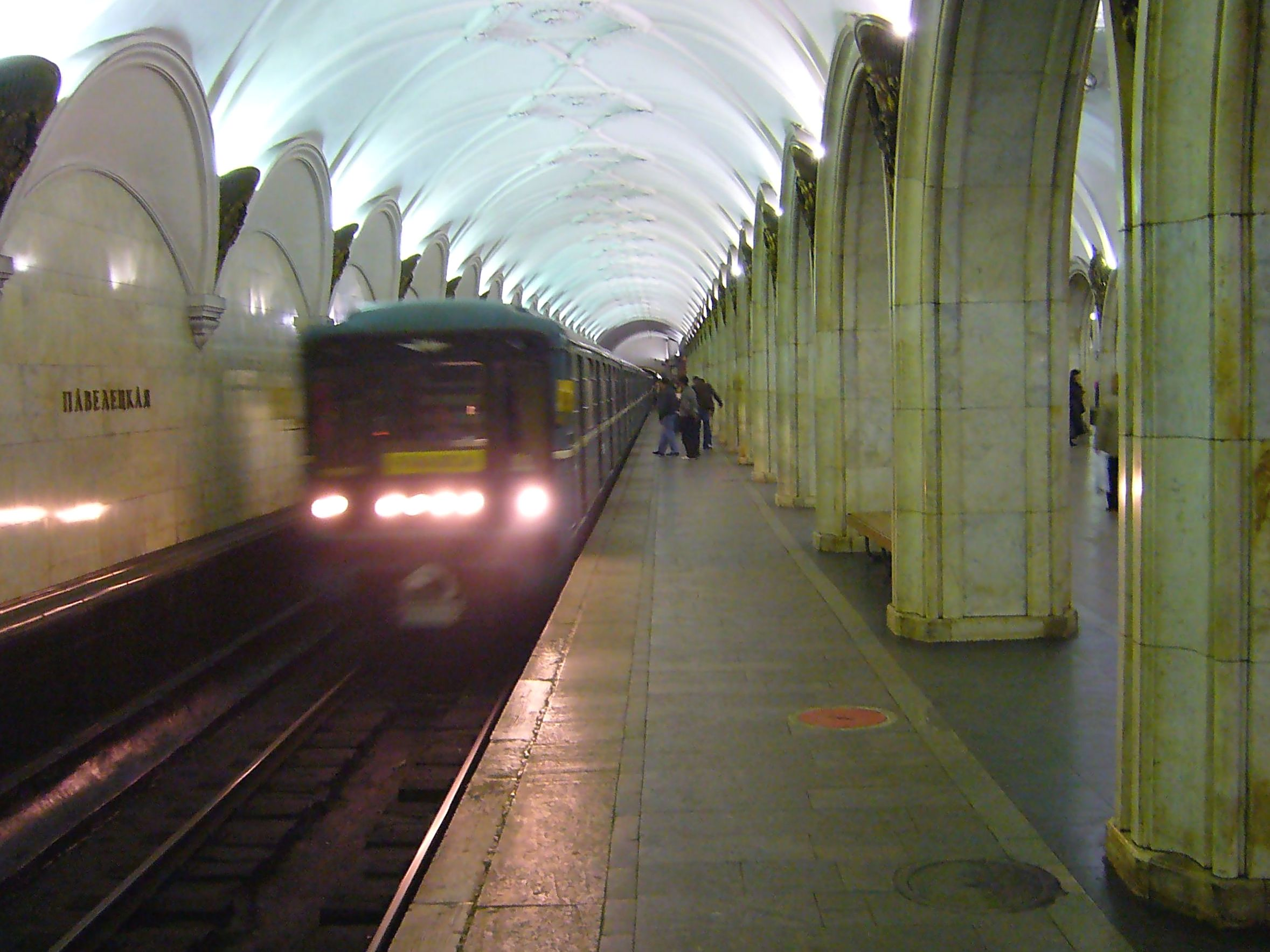
Incoming train on the platform

- Paveletskaya has two transfers to a station of the same name on the Koltsevaya line – either through tunnel, or through the common surface vestibule on the northern side of Garden Ring.
- Southern exit directly connects to Paveletsky railway terminal which, in particular, provides express train service to Domodedovo International Airport.
