= Petrovsky Passage =

Elite department store in downtown Moscow, Russia

Coordinates: 55°45′45″N 37°37′8″E

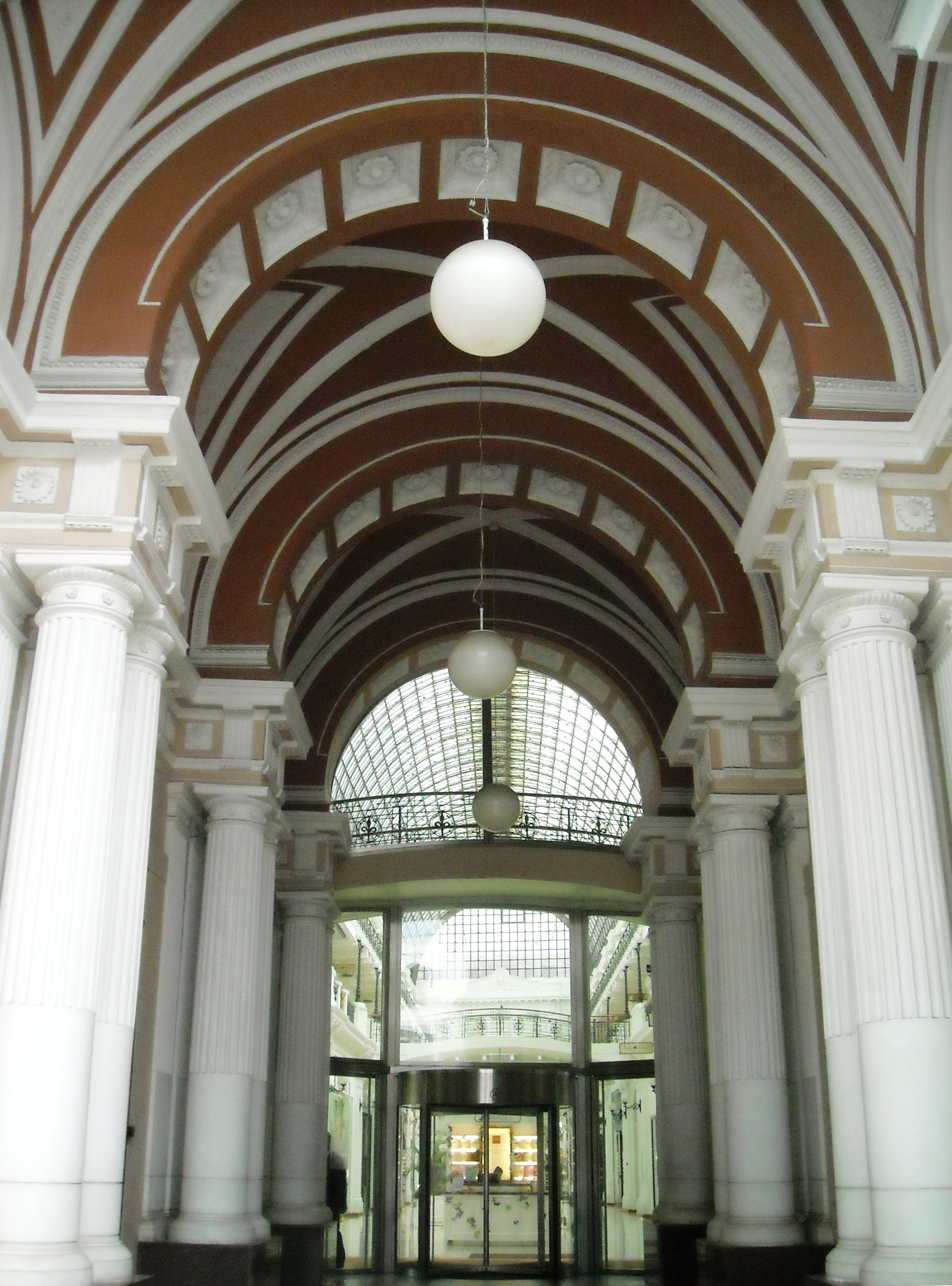
Petrovsky Passage

Petrovsky Passage (Russian: Петровский Пассаж) is an elite department store that opened on Petrovka Street in downtown Moscow in 1906. The engineer Vladimir Shukhov, also responsible for the GUM and the Shabolovka tower, designed a covered arcade with two wide three-storey galleries covered with high-pitched semi-cylindrical glass vaulting. The second storeys of opposite galleries are connected by exquisitely designed ferroconcrete catwalks. In the 1990s, the shop was revamped as the centre of one of the most expensive shopping areas in Europe.

== Gallery ==
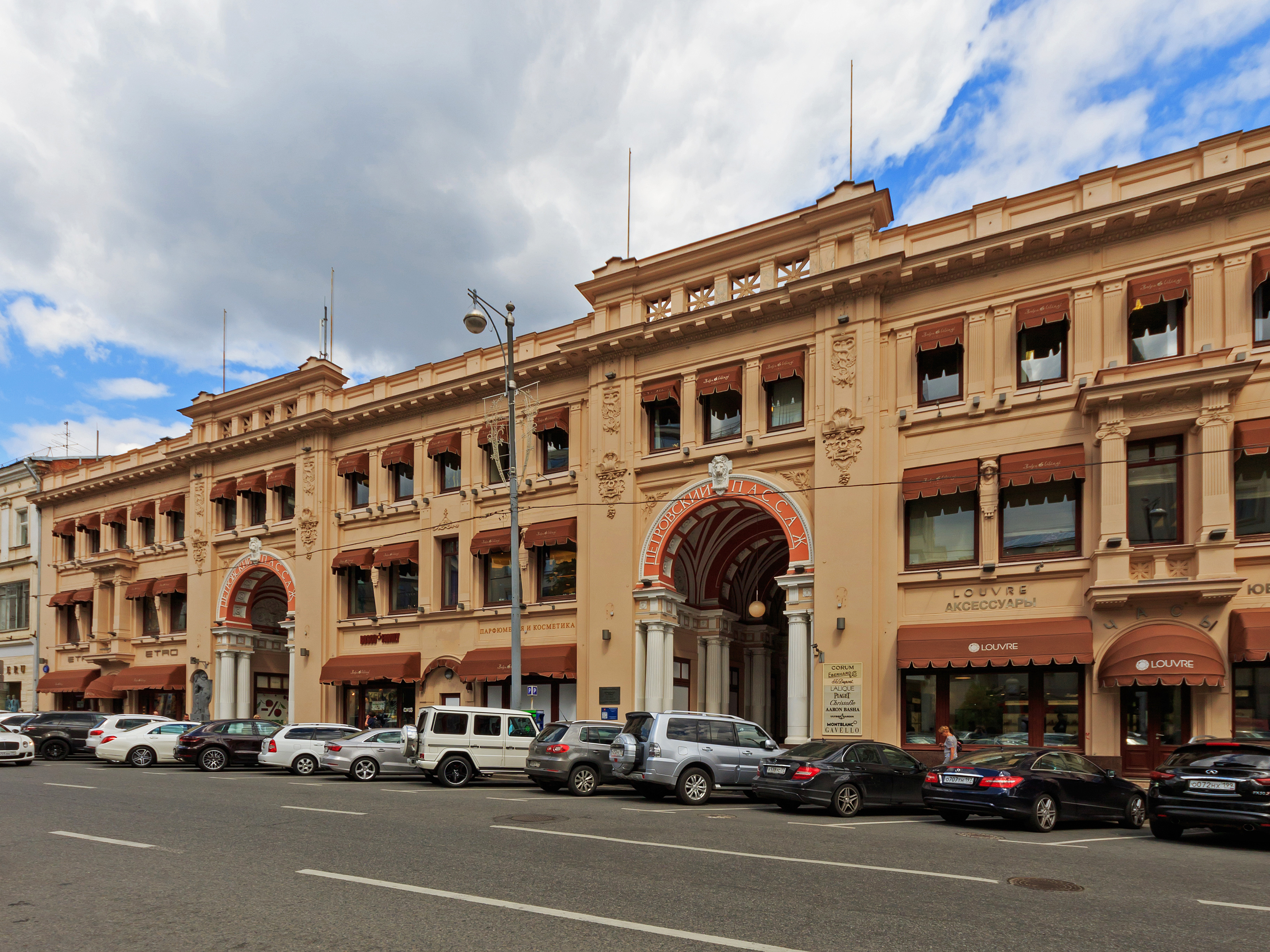
View from the Petrovka Street

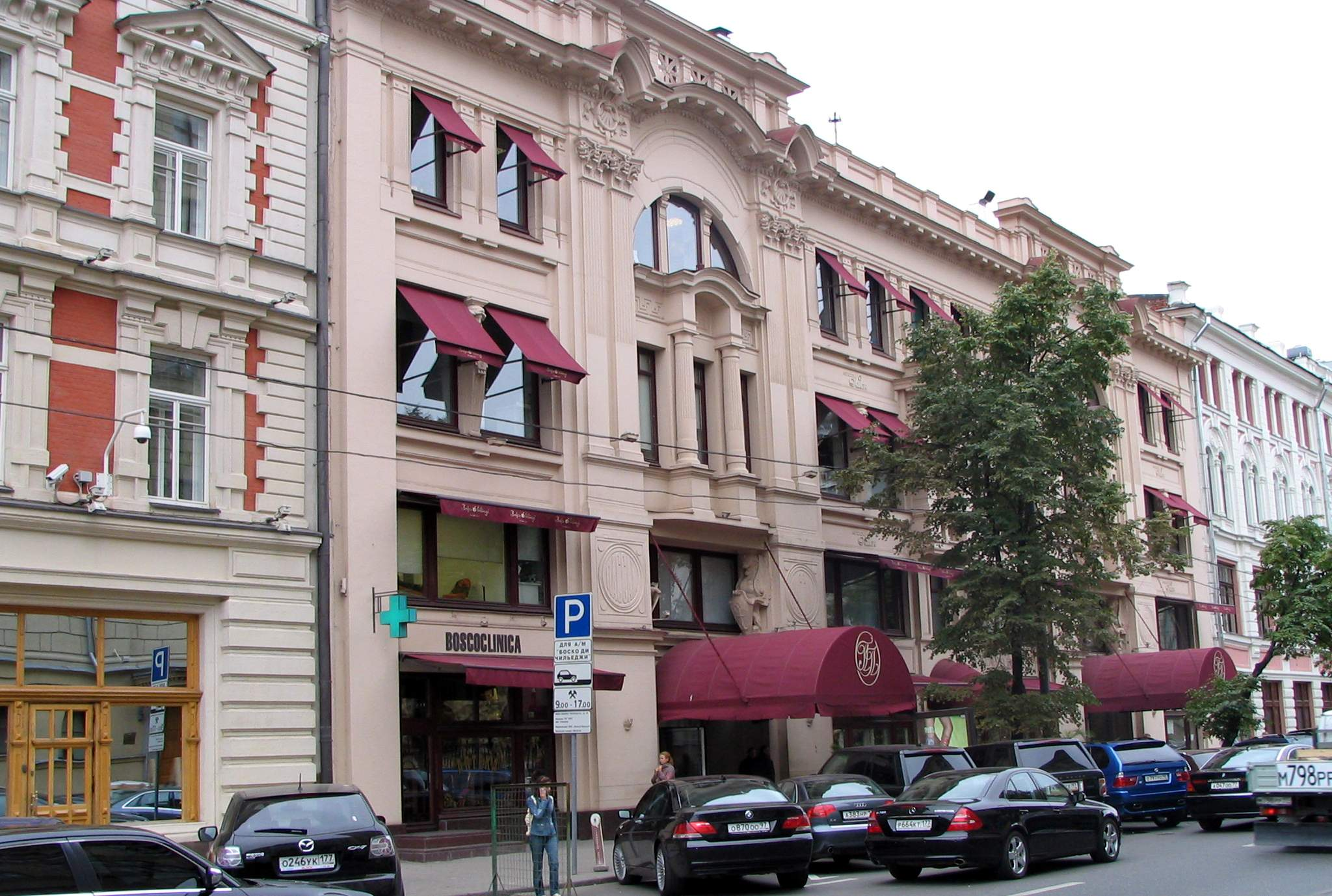
View from the Neglinnaya Street

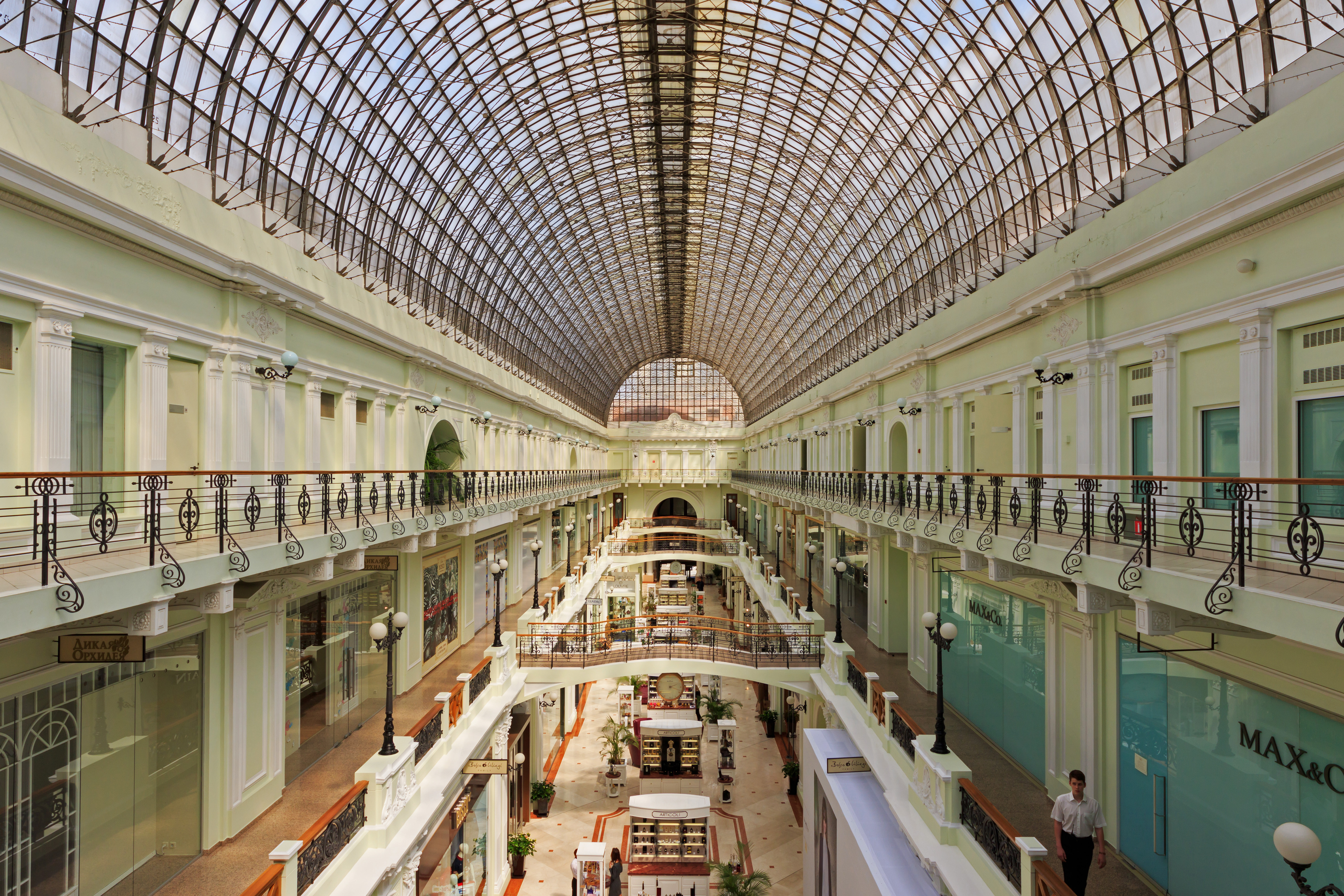
Interior

== See also ==
- Tretyakov Drive
- The Passage
