= Novokuznetskaya =

Moscow Metro station

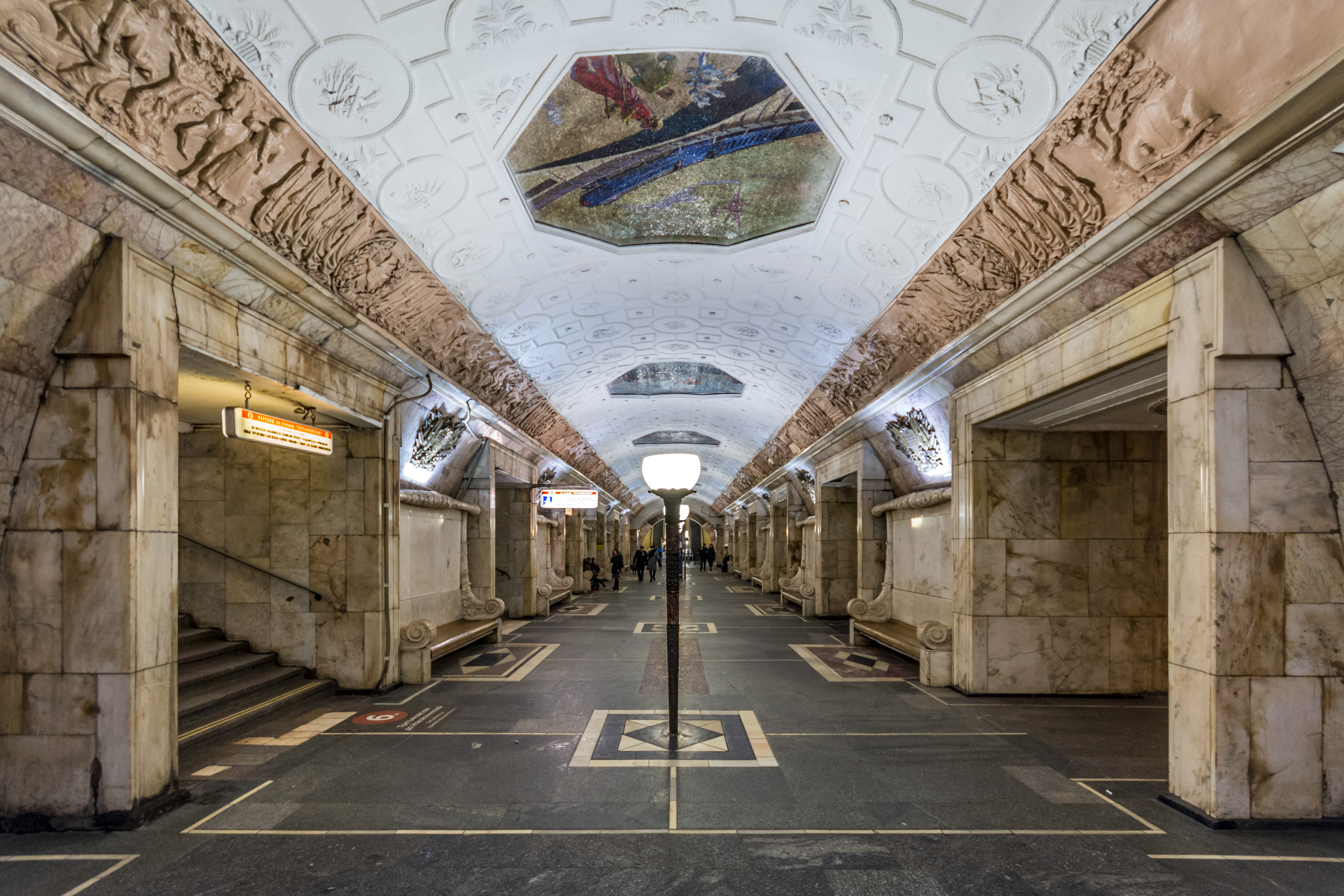

General information
- Location: Zamoskvorechye District; Central Administrative Okrug; Moscow; Russia
- Coordinates: 55.7415°N 37.6295°E
- System: Moscow Metro station
- Owner: Moskovsky Metropoliten
- Line: Zamoskvoretskaya line
- Platforms: 1 island platform
- Tracks: 2
- Connections: Bus: м90, н8 (night route); Tram: A, 3, 39

Construction
- Depth: 37.5 metres (123 ft)
- Platform levels: 1
- Parking: No

Other information
- Station code: 031

History
- Opened: 20 November 1943; 82 years ago

Services
Preceding station	Moscow Metro	Following station
Teatralnaya towards Khovrino	Zamoskvoretskaya line	Paveletskaya towards Alma-Atinskaya
Oktyabrskaya towards Novoyasenevskaya	Kaluzhsko-Rizhskaya line transfer at Tretyakovskaya	Kitay-gorod towards Medvedkovo
Terminus	Kalininsko-Solntsevskaya line (Kalininsky radius) transfer at Tretyakovskaya	Marksistskaya towards Novokosino
Route map
Location
- Location within Central Moscow

Novokuznetskaya (Russian: Новокузнецкая) is a Moscow Metro station on the Zamoskvoretskaya Line. The station was opened on 20 November 1943.

== History ==
Construction of the station began shortly after the launch of the second stage in 1938. Despite World War II the station was opened on time. Later in 1978 the platform was lengthened. This part is in a more modern style than the rest of the station.

== Design ==
The station honors the Soviet fighting men with its heavy ornamentation. The architects, I. Taranov and N. Bykova, won a USSR State Prize for their design.

The decorations include seven octagonal ceiling mosaics by Vladimir Frolov on the theme of wartime industry and bas-reliefs running along the base of the ceiling (by artists N.V. Tomsky, A.E. Zelensky, S.M. Rabinovich, and N.M. Shtamm) depicting the soldiers of the Red Army in combat. The pink and white marble pylons are also decorated with cast-bronze portraits of Russian war heroes like Mikhail Kutuzov and Alexander Nevsky. Floor lamps, long since replaced with more up-to-date lighting in other Metro stations, still give Novokuznetskaya an atmosphere of brooding shadow.

There is an urban legend that the station's ornate benches were made of Carrara marble taken from the Cathedral of Christ the Saviour just before it was demolished (in 1931), but it is not true, and the marble was from Ural, not Italy.

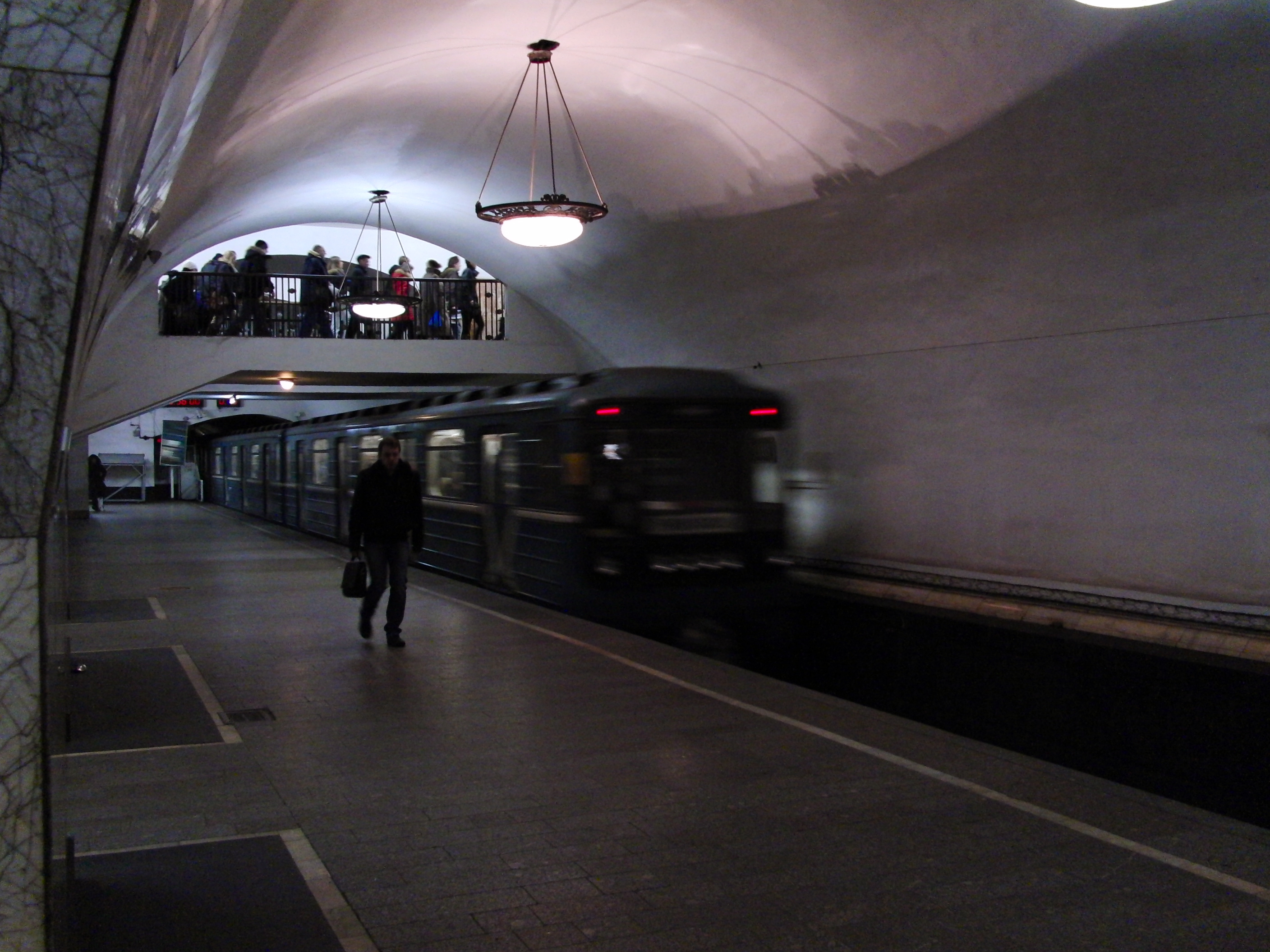
Station platform with leaving train. Note the upper pass connects with Tretyakovskaya station, served by the Kaluzhsko-Rizhskaya Line and the Kalininskaya Line

== Exits ==
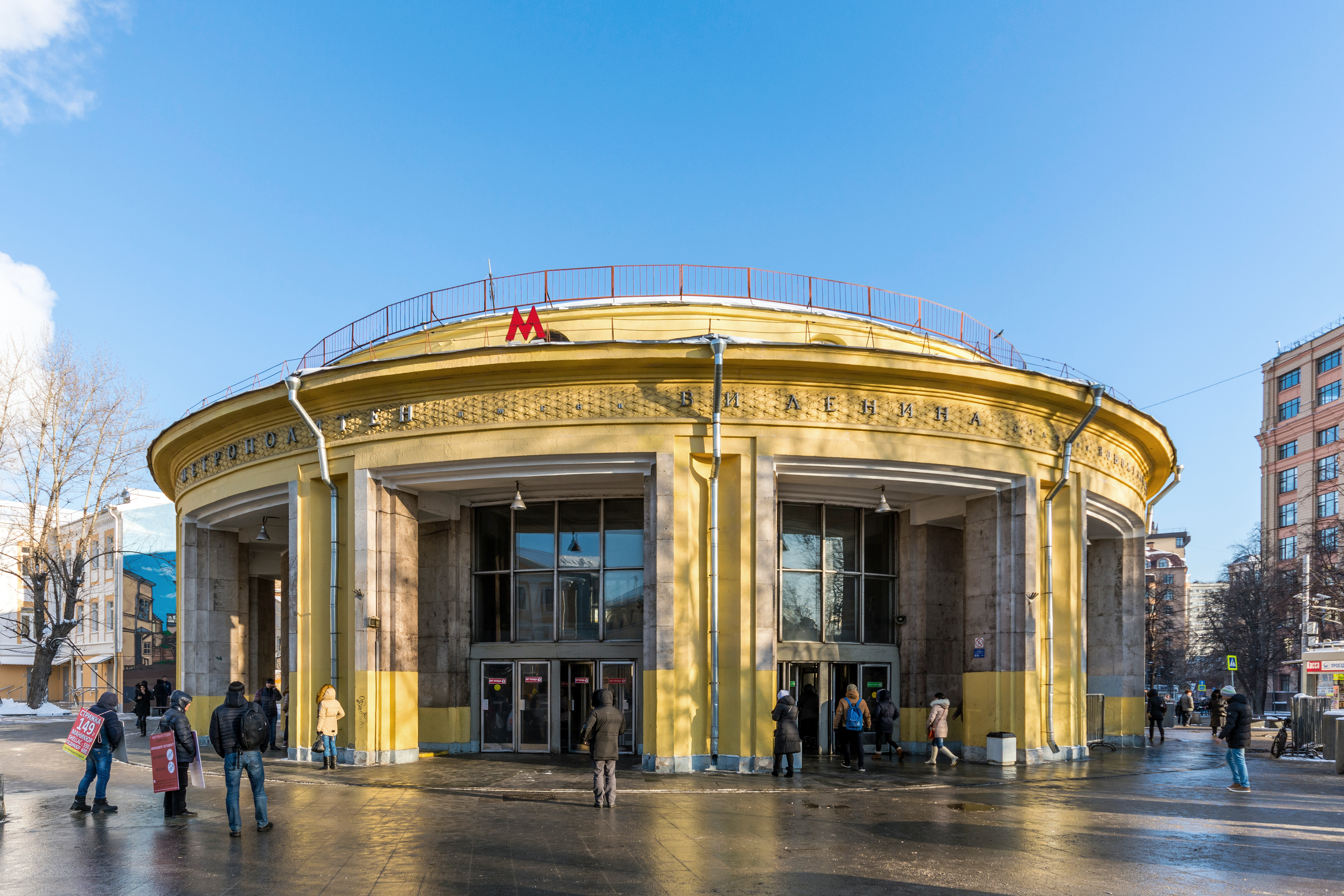
Novokuznetskaya vestibule

Novokuznetskaya's round entrance vestibule is located off Pyatnitskaya Street, north of the intersection with Klimentovsky lane.

== Transfers ==
From this station it is possible to transfer to Tretyakovskaya, a cross-platform station serving both the Kaluzhsko-Rizhskaya Line and the Kalininskaya Line.
