= Yakimanka District =

District of Central Administrative Okrug, Moscow, Russia

Yakimanka District район Якиманка (Russian)
- District
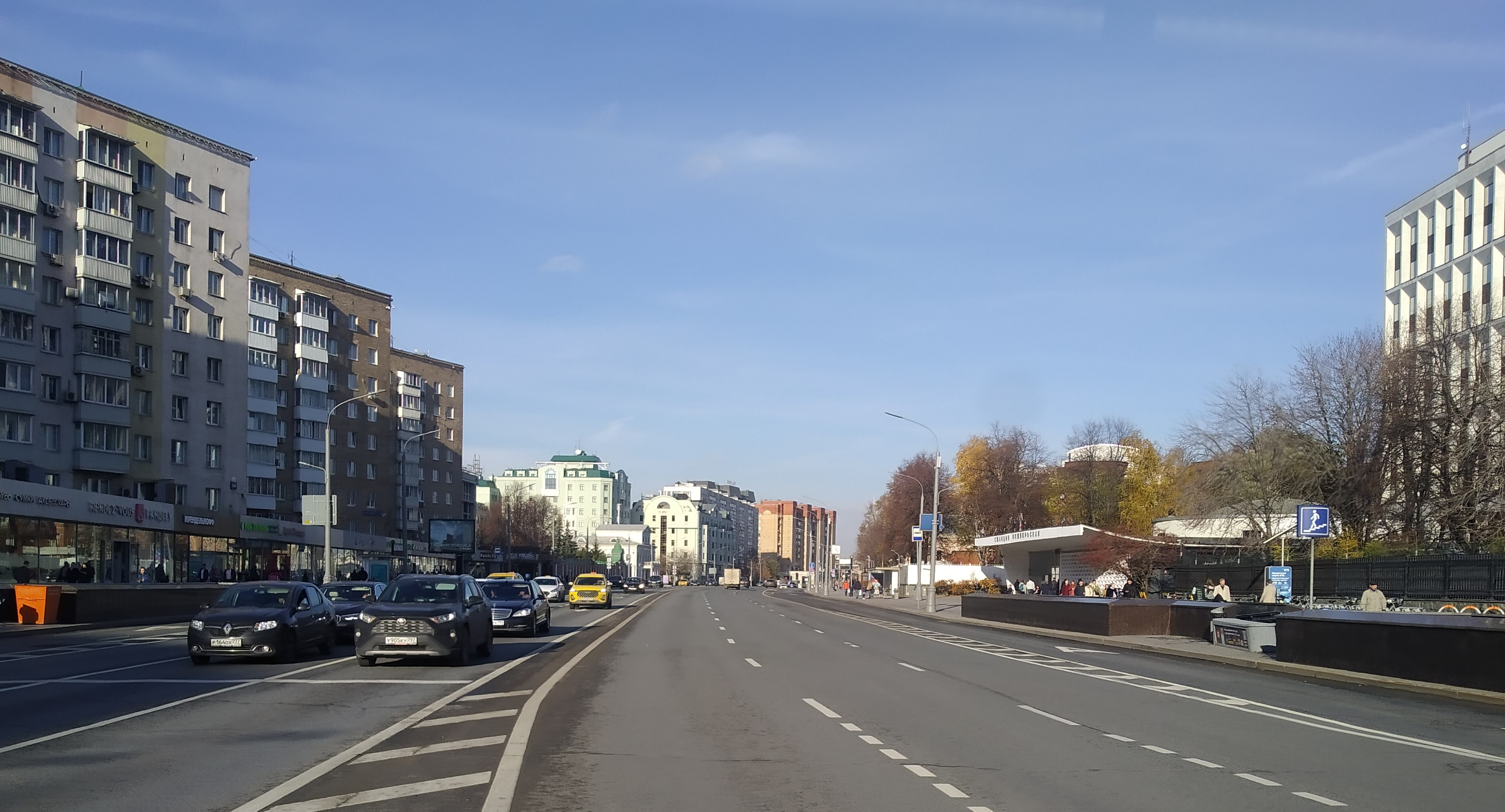

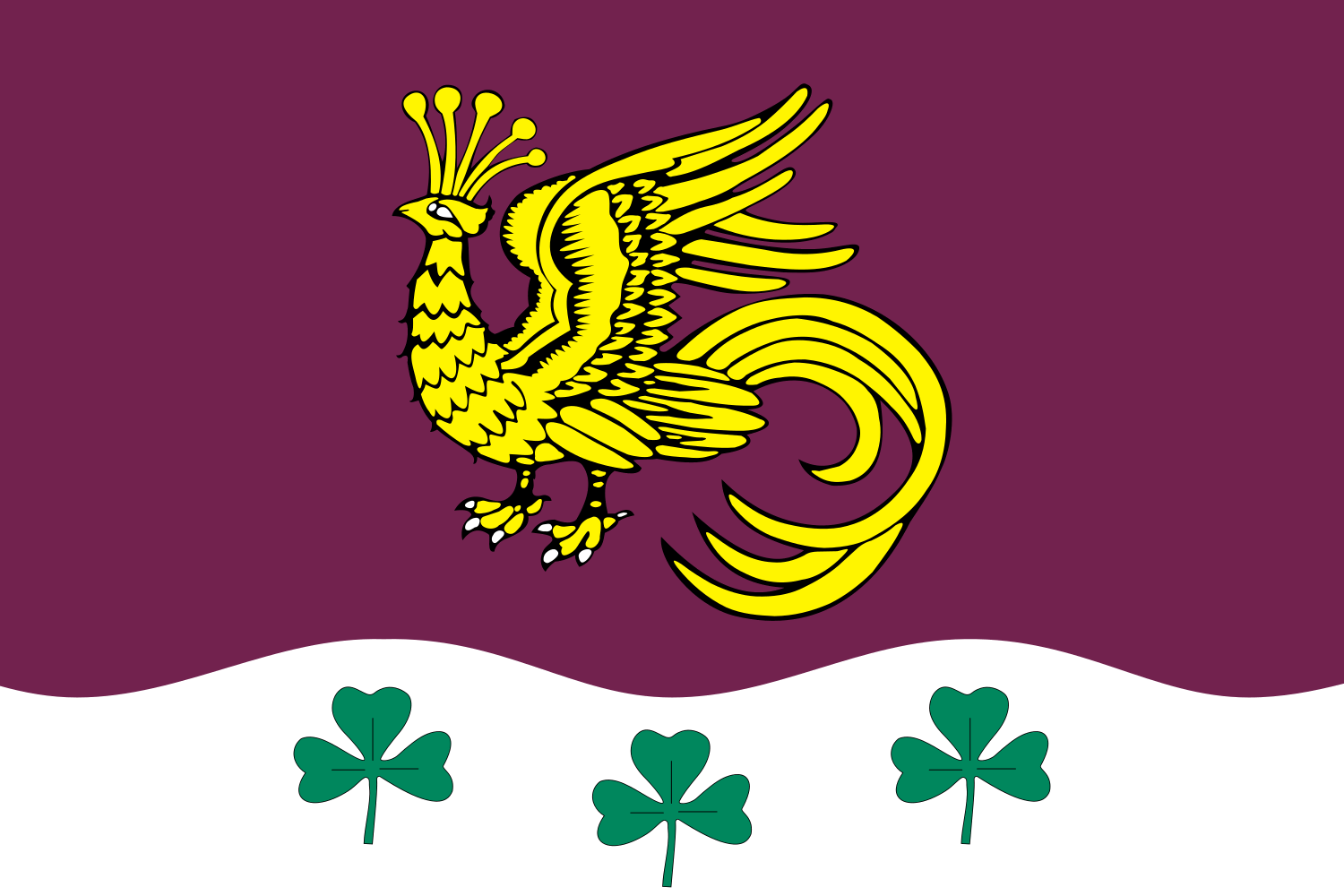
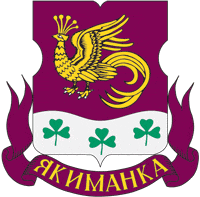
- Flag Coat of arms
- Interactive map of Yakimanka District
- Coordinates: 55°43′53″N 37°36′14″E
- Country: Russia
- Federal subject: Moscow
- Time zone: UTC+3 (MSK)
- OKTMO ID: 45384000

Yakimanka District in Moscow

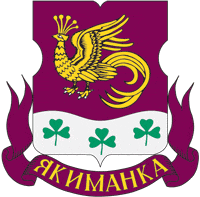
Coat of arms of Yakimanka District

Yakimanka District (Russian: райо́н Якима́нка) is a district of Central Administrative Okrug of the federal city of Moscow, Russia. Population: 26,578 (2010 census); 22,822 (2002 census).

It is named after the former church of Saint Joachim and Saint Anne. Yakimanka contains the western half of the historical Zamoskvorechye area (its eastern half is administered as Zamoskvorechye District proper), including the Tretyakov Gallery and the territories of Gorky Park and Neskuchny Sad. The boundary between Yakimanka and Zamoskvorechye districts follows Balchug Street and Bolshaya Ordynka Street (north of the Garden Ring), Korovy Val and Mytnaya Streets (south of the Garden Ring).

== History ==
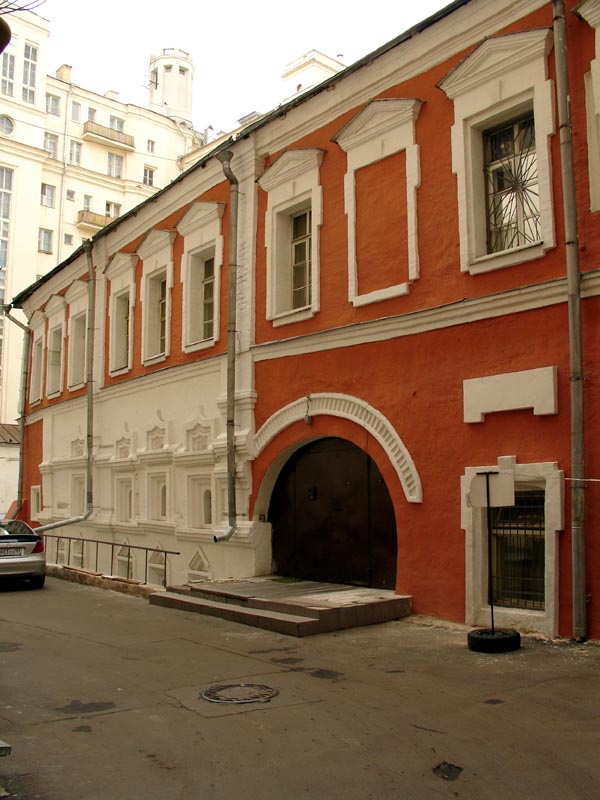
17th-century palace, Ordynsky Tupik. Writers' Apartments in the background

=== Old Muscovy ===
Territories on the right (southern) bank of Moskva River, now known as Zamoskvorechye, were colonized from the fourteenth century. Two river crossings, west and east of the Kremlin walls, continued south to Kaluga and Serpukhov, and served as main axes of settlement. The western part of Yakimanka District (between the Moskva River and Bolshaya Yakimanka Street) was regularly flooded, and thus its inhabited area was contained within a 700-meter-wide tract of land between Bolshaya Yakimanka and Bolshaya Ordynka streets (formerly the Kaluga and Serpukhov roads). The floodland was gradually built out in the nineteenth century when the Babiegorodskaya Dam was completed, but even then a large field existed near Krymsky Bridge until 1972, when the new building of the Tretyakov Gallery was built. The clover leaves on the district's coat of arms are a memory of these fields. (See Balchug for an explanation of the Vodootvodny Canal flood control development that separated the Bersenevka and Boloto neighborhoods from the mainland and the history of the island.)

The lands south of the Moskva River, exposed to southern enemies, were regularly destroyed by raiders, notably by Algirdas in 1366 and 1368, Tokhtamysh in 1382, Edigu in 1408, and the Tatar pretender Mazovsha in 1451. Permanent militarized settlements of Muscovites, called slobodas, were established by Prince Vasili III in the early sixteenth century. The fortified line on the site of the present-day Garden Ring was built in 1591–1592 in the reign of Feodor I. The church of St. Joachim and St. Anne at Bolshaya Yakimanka, 13, which gave the district its name, was initially built in 1493 and subsequently rebuilt before being destroyed by the Soviet government (see 19th century photo).

Yakimanka District has had a diverse and rapidly changing ethnic and social composition:

- Continuous presence of Tatars since 14th century; Ordynka Street is named after the Golden Horde (in Russian, orda). Chernigov Lane was named in memory of Prince Mikhail of Chernigov, killed by the Horde and buried in the area.
- 16/17th-century settlement of foreign mercenaries employed by Vasili III, Ivan Grozny, and the early Romanovs.
- 17th-century settlement of former Polish prisoners of war who remained in Moscow after the Time of Troubles, known as Babiy Gorodok (Бабий городок, "women's town").
- A settlement of court translators (tolmachi), who dealt with foreign visitors (current Tolmachevsky Lanes).
- 16/17th-century settlements of Cossacks (current Kazachy Lanes) and Streltsy, dispersed after the Streltsy Uprising of 1698 (Pyzhevsky Lane, after the streltsy colonel Bogdan Pyzhov; formerly Griboedovsky Lane).
- Golutvin sloboda, owned by the Kolomna Golutvin Monastery (current Golutvinsky Lanes)
- Barrel makers sloboda (kadashi, Kadashevsky Lanes).
- Mint workers (Staromonetny Lane).

=== 18th century ===
The century was preceded by mass executions of streltsy. September 30, 1698 Peter I hanged 36 soldiers at the Serpukhov Gate, 36 at the Kaluga Gate, etc., physically destroying the human core of the sloboda system. By 1720, all streltsy troops were disbanded. At the same time, craftsmen lost their businesses when the royal court relocated to Saint Petersburg. The patchwork sloboda system of Zamoskvorechye fell apart, and within the 18th century social diversity settled down. Bolshaya Yakimanka remained a quiet street of single-family households, many of them still farming on the floodlands; Bolshaya Ordynka was inhabited by wealthy merchants. Zamoskvorechye merchant became a catchword for an ultraconservative, bearded, pious archetype, the subject of Aleksandr Ostrovsky's plays. Even the wealthiest of them lived in country-style single-story houses on spacious lots, a few of which remain today. The areas on the edge of the city, where Peter hanged his soldiers, were taken over by grain warehouses and market squares, commemorated in the names of Zhitnaya ("wheat") and Mytnaya ("tax") streets.

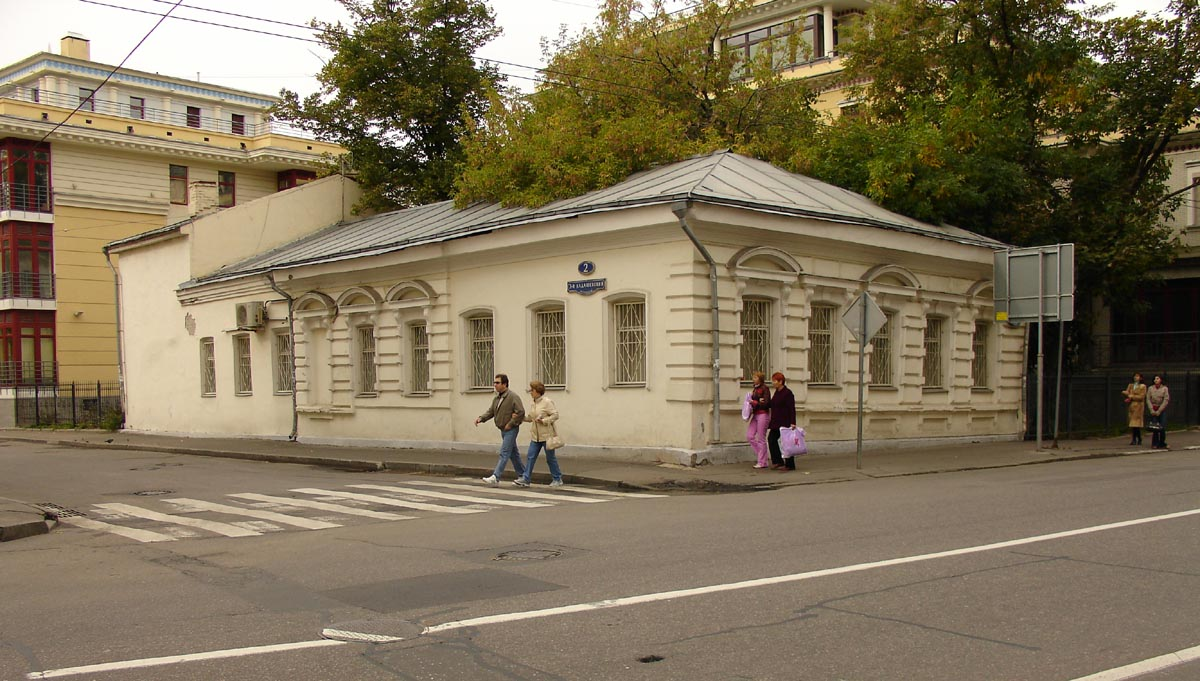
Bolshaya Ordynka, 16, one of the remaining historical houses

Yakimanka was established as an administrative district in 1782, when Catherine II divided Moscow into 20 police districts. In particular, Zamoskvorechye was divided between the Yakimanka and Pyatnitzkaya police precincts.

A different development began at the end of the century on the Kaluga road outside the Garden Ring (which at that time was a city rampart, not a garden or a street). The present-day territory of Gorky Park and Neskuchny Sad, between the Kaluga road and the Moskva River, was home to the country houses of the Golitsyn, Demidov, Trubetskoy, Stroganov and later Orlov families. In 1793, Prince Dmitry Golitsyn bequeathed 900,000 roubles to build Moscow's first free public hospital. The project, supported by the dowager Empress Maria Feodorovna, was completed in 1796–1802 by Matvey Kazakov. Although the Golitsyn family owned lands nearby, the hospital was set on Stroganov family land. Hospital construction continued on Kaluga Road throughout the next century. Today, these hospitals belong to Yakimanka District and are known as First City (Первая Градская).

=== 19th century ===
Former British Embassy in Boloto, facing Kremlin, originally Gustav List mansion

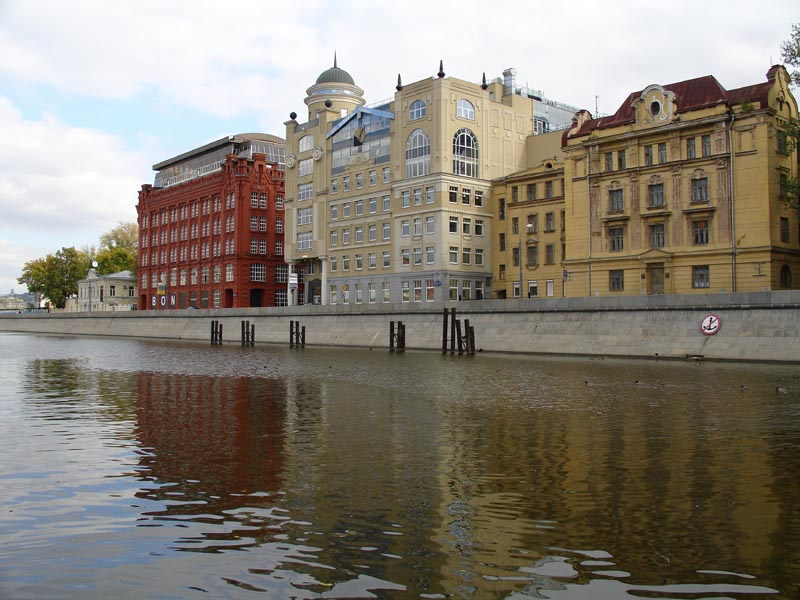
Golutvin Sloboda offices, converted 19th century factories

The Fire of 1812 swept the entire area except for a few blocks in the southern end of Bolshaya Yakimanka and Kazakov's hospital (which took care of both Russian and French troops). The construction of the Babiegorodskaya Dam and the clearing of the Vodootvodny Canal in the 1830s reduced the flood hazard, but the land remained cheap. This led to the steady industrialization of Zamoskvorechye. For example, Gustav List set up his first metalworking factory in Boloto, directly across from the Kremlin (his mansion, also in Boloto, would later house the British embassy).

While most of Yakimanka remained a traditional, low-rise merchant neighborhood, a cluster of large five- to seven-story factory buildings emerged in Golutvin and Bersenevka (Golutvin was the birthplace of Pavel Ryabushinsky). Most of these are now converted to office space, while Krasny Oktyabr chocolate factory (originally Einem) is scheduled for conversion soon. Hotels catering to businesspeople were built nearby in Boloto and Balchug Street.

In 1896, the city built an electrical power plant in Zamoskvorechye District (MOGES-1, the oldest existing power plant). The second power plant, built specifically for the tram network, emerged in Yakimanka District, also in Bersenevka, and operates today. Since that time, electrical and oiling offices are major tenants on the Balchug island.

The late nineteenth century was also a time of charity and social experiments. The Tretyakov Gallery, which started as Pavel Tretyakov's private collection in the 1850s, opened to the public in 1892. The existing building, with a facade designed by Apollinary Vasnetsov, was completed in 1899–1904. Pavel Tretyakov also financed the construction and operation of the free housing for widows and children of Russian artists, located north from the Gallery.

Morozov Hospital, the city's first surgical hospital for children, started in 1896 as a two-room Red Cross clinic. The Morozov family financed construction of the two-story existing building in Bolshaya Polyanka. Another free hospital was operated by the Marfo-Mariinsky Convent. Finally, the city and private philanthropists also provided cheap or free housing; the largest public housing projects were launched in the 1890s in Boloto. The best known of these projects, Bakhrushin Free Apartments (1898-1900, Sofiyskaya Embankment, 26), now houses Rosneft headquarters.

=== Modern history ===
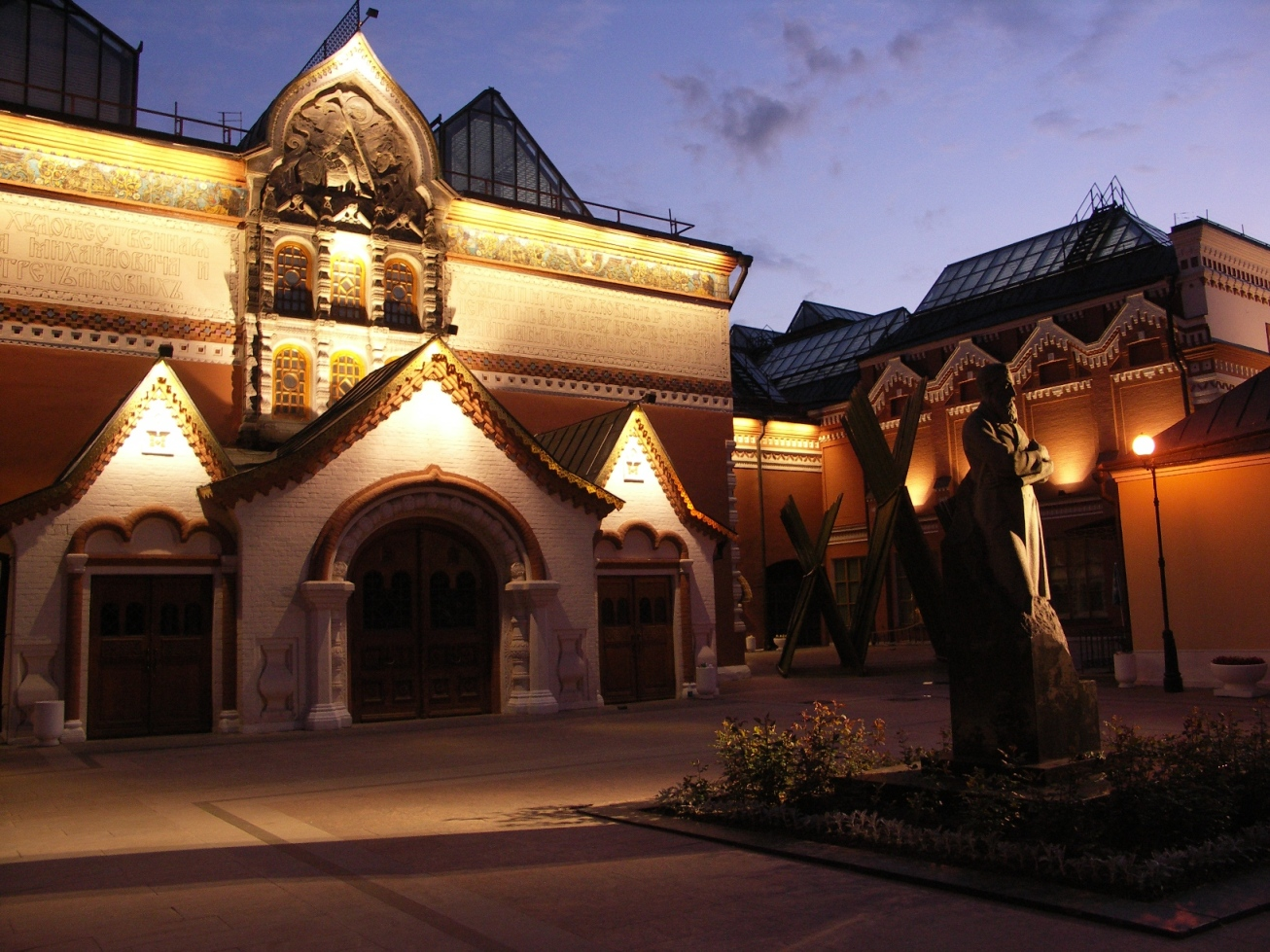
Tretyakov Gallery, recently expanded

In 1922, Bolshevik authorities closed and looted 22 churches in Zamoskvorechye, including the churches of St. Joachim and St. Anne, St. Maron, St. Gregory of Nyssa, and others; the Church of St. John the Warrior remained the only functioning church in Yakimanka. St. Joachim and St. Anne was torn down in 1933. However, compared to other districts, the Joseph Stalin era brought very little damage to Yakimanka; the area seemed to be neglected.

In the 1920s, the old Wine and Salt Court in Bersenevka was replaced by the House on Embankment; further south, Moscow's first cooperative apartment building was completed in 1926. Gorky Park development began in 1923 with the first All-Russian Agricultural Exhibition; in 1928, the fairgrounds were reopened as a public park. The existing Stalin-style entrance arch was added later, in 1950s.

The 1935 Moscow Master Plan called for completing the Boulevard Ring through Zamoskvorechye, which was not done. The only trace of this project is the 1937 Writers' Apartments building facing the Tretyakov building (expanded in the 1950s and 2000s); it housed elite writers like Yevgeny Petrov of Ilf and Petrov fame, Boris Pasternak, and Konstantin Paustovsky. Similar grand Stalinist buildings were planned all along the new route, but were cancelled.

The most important outcome of Stalin's projects came with completion of the 1932–1938 Moscow Canal: floods were no longer a threat for the Yakimanka lowlands. River banks that formerly shifted every season were firmly set in granite; all downtown Moscow river and Vodootvodny Canal bridges were rebuilt to six- to eight-lane capacity.

Major destruction of Yakimanka took place in Leonid Brezhnev's time. The western side of Bolshaya Yakimanka was rebuilt in the high-rise style typical of the time. Similar structures appeared in Polyanka Street, both as infills and as block-wide projects. This was followed by facadist "reconstruction" of the 1990s-2000s and new high-rises like the 15-story Copernicus building. The city, however, rejected construction of the avant-garde towers designed by Erick van Egeraat.

== Notable buildings, cultural and educational facilities ==
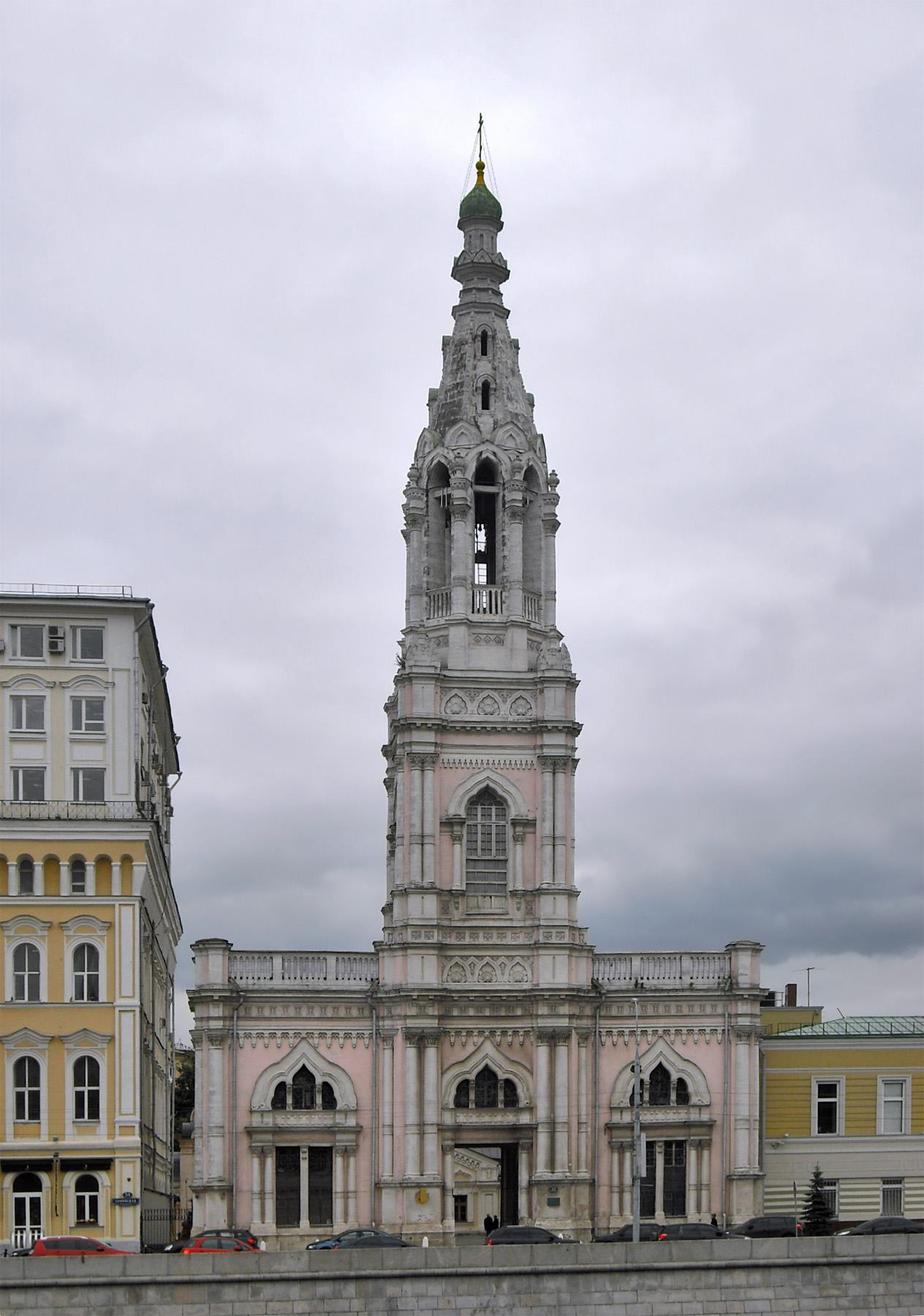
Belltower of St. Sophia church in Moscow

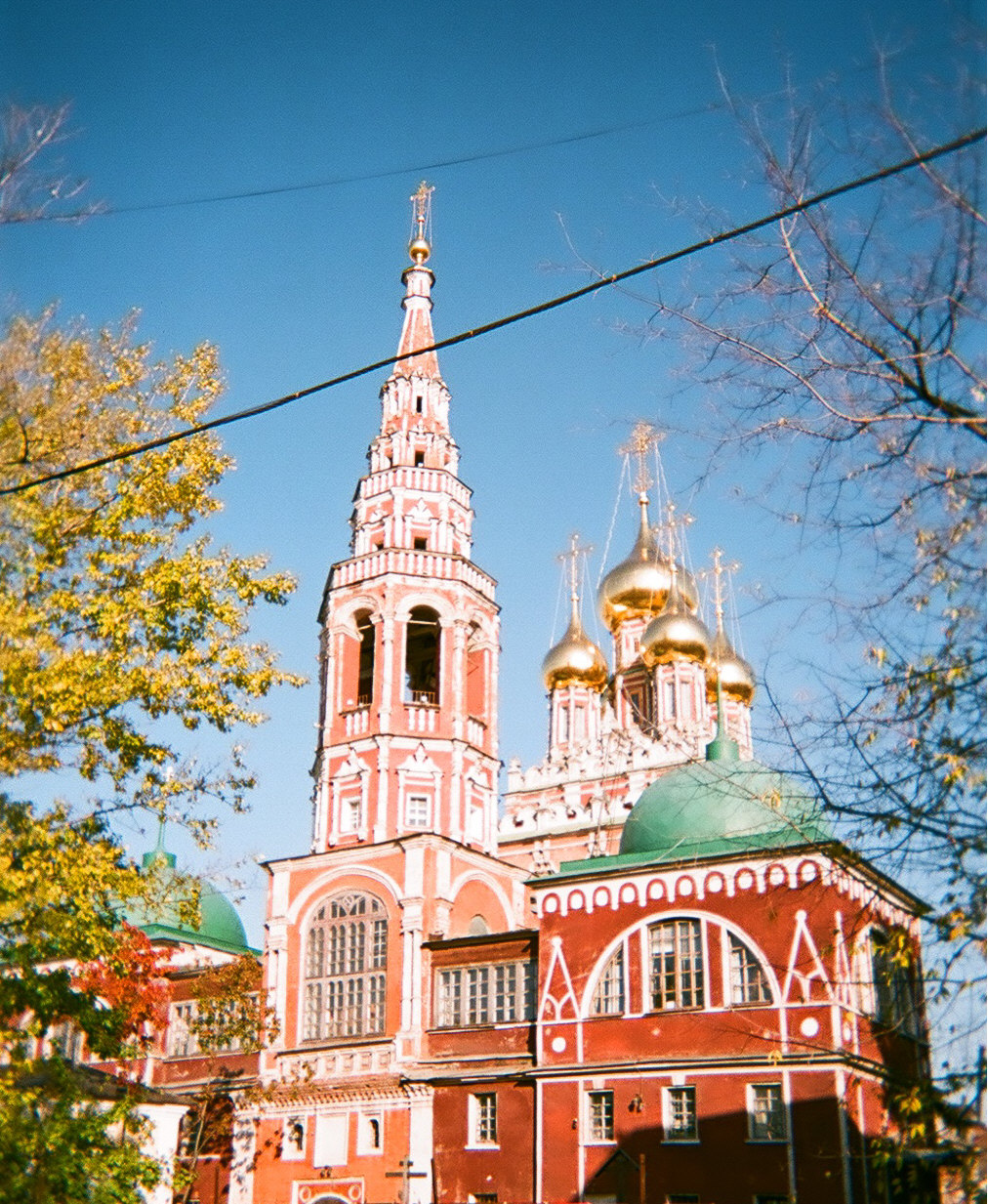
Church of the Resurrection in Kadashi

=== Museums ===
- Tretyakov Gallery
- Tretyakov Gallery exhibition hall on Krymsky Val, with the nearby sculpture park
- Art Museum of Vasili Tropinin and his contemporaries (Schetininsky, 10)
- Averky Kirillov estate in Bersenevka (by appointment)
- House on Embankment museum www.museum.ru (by appointment)
- Marat Gelman gallery (Malaya Polyanka, 7/7)

=== Churches ===
- Marfo-Mariinsky Convent (1908–1912, architect: Alexey Shchusev, Bolshaya Ordynka, 34)
- Church of the Dormition (1695–1697, Bolshaya Polyanka, 37) www.pravoslavie.ru
- Church of the Iberian Icon of Theotokos at Children's Hospital (1896–1901, Bolshaya Polyanka, 20) www.pravoslavie.ru
- Church of the Icon of Theotokos, the Joy in Sorrow (1831–1836, architect: Joseph Bove) photo www.pravoslavie.ru
- Church of the Resurrection in Kadashi (2nd Kadashevsky 7-14) www.pravoslavie.ru
- Saint Sophia Church in Sadovniki (1682–1686, belltower: 1862–1868, Sofiyskaya naberezhnaya, 32) photo
- Church of St. Catherine (1766–1767, architect: Karl Blank, Bolshaya Ordynka, 60/2) www.pravoslavie.ru
- Church of St. Gregory of Nyssa (1668–1679, Bolshaya Polyanka, 29A) www.pravoslavie.ru
- Church of St. John the Warrior (1704–1717, Bolshaya Yakimanka, 46) www.pravoslavie.ru
- Church of St. Maron the Hermit in Baby Gorodok, former Polish Sloboda (1727–1730, Bolshaya Yakimanka 32-2) www.pravoslavie.ru
- Church of St. Mikhail of Chernigov and Fyodor (1675, Chernigovsky, 3) www.pravoslavie.ru
- Church of St. Nicholas in Bersenevka (1656–1657, Bersenevskaya Naberezhnaya, 18)
- Church of St. Nicholas in Tolmachi (Maly Tolmachevsky, 9) www.pravoslavie.ru
- Church of the Trinity in Shabolovka (1885–1895, Shabolovka, 21)
- Churches of First City Hospital (Leninsky Prospect, 8)

=== Theaters ===
- Teatr Estrady in the House on Embankment

=== Memorial buildings ===
- Embassy of France, former Igumnov House, 1888–1895 (www.ambafrance.ru, www.rian.ru, o-moskve.narod.ru)
- Single-story house in Bolshaya Yakimanka, 8, remains of old Golutvin sloboda
- Writers' Building (Lavrushinsky lane, across Tretyakov Gallery)

== Government and infrastructure ==
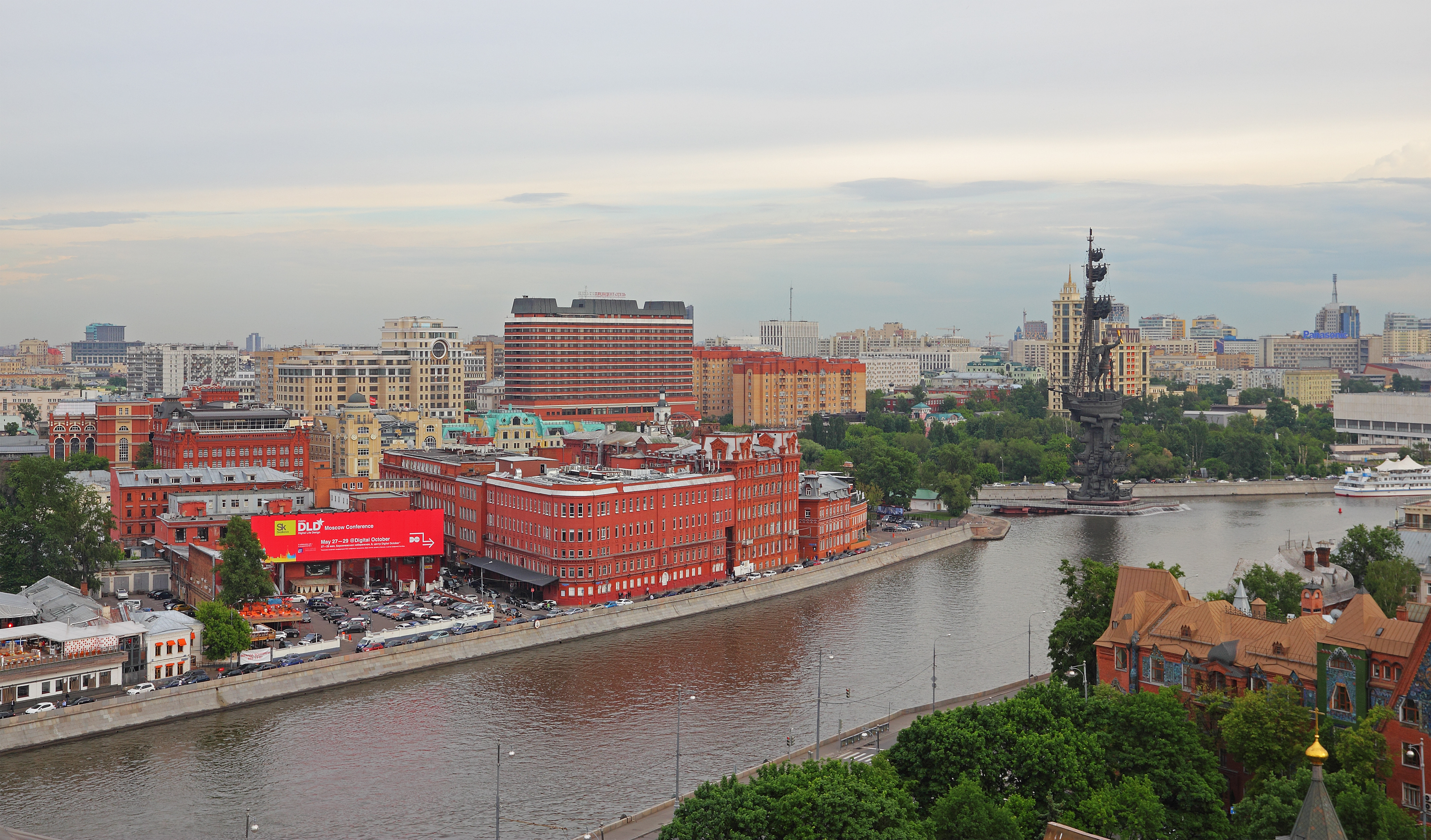
View of a part of Yakimanka from the Cathedral of Christ the Saviour

The Interstate Aviation Committee (IAC or MAK), the aviation accident technical investigation body of the Commonwealth of Independent States, has its head office in the district.

The Federal Penitentiary Service has its head office in Yakimanka District.

== Public transportation access ==
Moscow Metro:

- Polyanka, Tretyakovskaya - north and center
- Oktyabrskaya-Radialnaya, Oktyabrskaya-Koltsevaya - south
- Dobryninskaya, Serpukhovskaya - south-east
