= Serpukhovsky =

Serpukhovsky (masculine), Serpukhovskaya (feminine), or Serpukhovskoye (neuter) may refer to:

- Serpukhovsky District, a district of Moscow Oblast, Russia
- Serpukhovskaya, a station of the Moscow Metro, Moscow, Russia
