= Yuri Kazarnovsky =

Russian poet

Yuri Alexandrovich Kazarnovsky (1904/5-1960?) was a Russian poet. He was born in Rostov-on-Don. As a student, he was a member of a subversive literary circle called Vremennik and was arrested by the Soviet authorities in 1926/1927. He spent the next four years (1928 to 1932) imprisoned in the Solovki prison camp. His poems of camp life were published in the OGPU-run prison journal "Solovetsky Islands". He also worked on the construction of the White Sea–Baltic Canal.

In 1936 he published his only book Stikhi or Poems. Soon after, in 1937, he was caught up in Stalin's purges, and spent four years in the Kolyma gulag (1938–1942). It is speculated that he was one of the last people to have met the poet Osip Mandelstam, who died in the gulag in 1938. He also worked in the camp in Mariinsk, Siberia. He spent his later years in poverty and addiction, in Tashkent and in Moscow, where he corresponded with a contemporary, the poet Ilya Selvinsky (1899–1968).

He was rehabilitated by the state in 1955 within his lifetime, and is believed to have died in 1960.
