= Church of St. John the Warrior =

Church in Moscow, Russia

Coordinates: 55°43′57″N 37°36′40″E

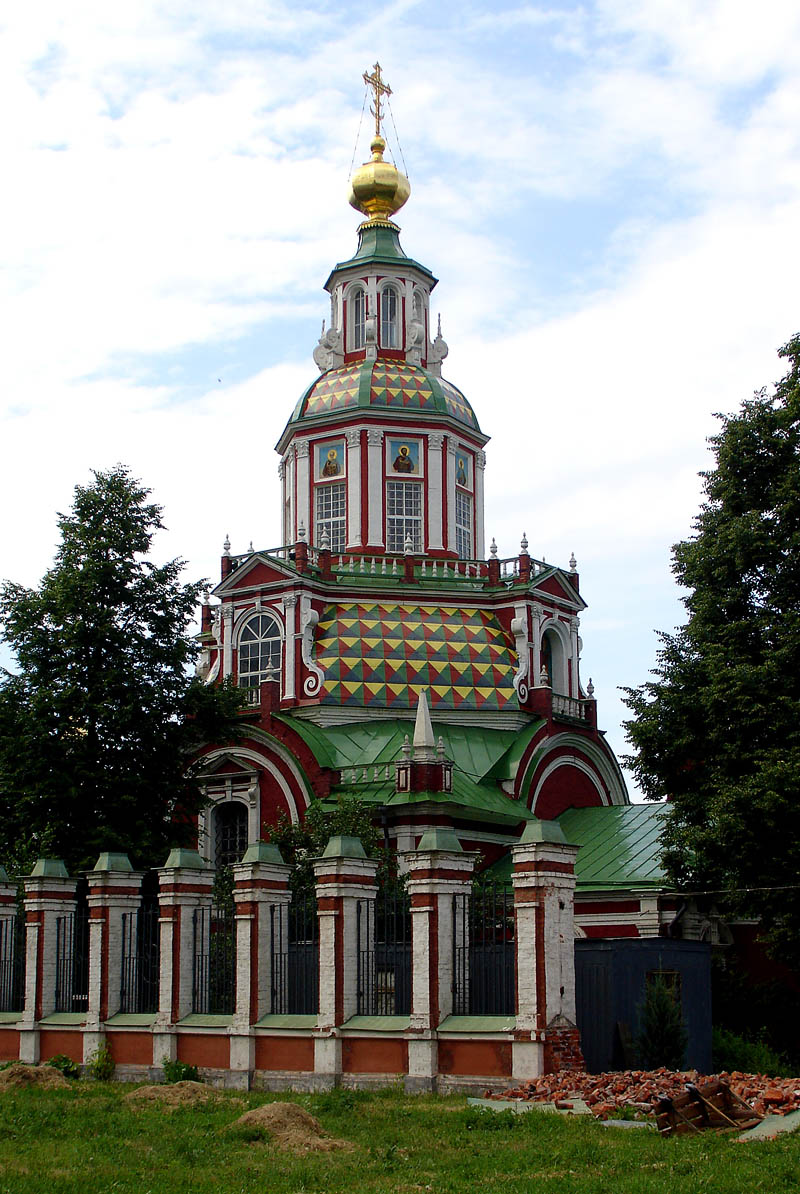
- Interactive map of the Church of St. John the Warrior area

General information
- Architectural style: Baroque
- Location: Yakimanka District, Moscow, Russia
- Construction started: 1704 or 1709
- Completed: 1717

Technical details
- Structural system: masonry

Design and construction
- Architect: attributed to Ivan Zarudny

Church of St. John the Warrior on Yakimanka Street (Russian: Церковь Иоанна Воина, Tserkov' Ivana Voina) is a Russian Orthodox church in Yakimanka District of Moscow erected in 1704–1717, during the reign of Peter the Great. It is attributed to architect Ivan Zarudny. The church address is 46, Bolshaya Yakimanka.

== History ==
The lowlands between present-day Bolshaya Yakimanka Street and Moskva River were regularly flooded in spring; they were occupied by sloboda settlements of Streltsy, Poles and ordinary farmers.

Legendary accounts link the present-day church with Peter I. Peter, examining the damage done by the flood, noticed the ruined church of St. John (1625). He ordered to rebuild in on a higher, safer lot, and financed the construction to commemorate the Battle of Poltava. The fence around St.John was erected later, in 1754–1758. In 1779–1791, the church was decorated by Gavriil Domozhirov (frescoes) and Vasili Bazhenov (iconostasis); this artwork was lost in 1860s. In 1928, the church was refitted with an iconostasis taken from the demolished Three Saints church at Red Gates.

After the Russian Revolution, numerous icons and relics from the churches destroyed by the Communists were stored in the Church of St. John. The church itself operated continuously through the entire Soviet period.

== Architecture ==
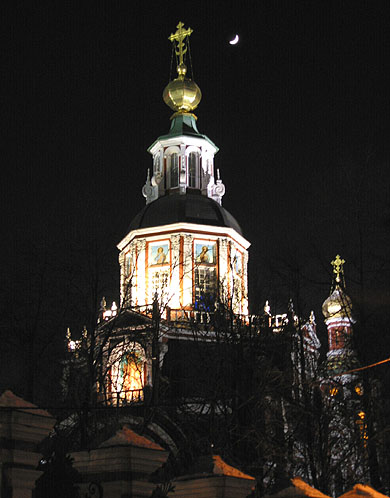
The church at night

The church combines elements of the Muscovite baroque style with the Ukrainian baroque and European influences prevalent in Russian architecture of Peter's reign. Architect remains unknown; similarities with Menshikov Tower suggest the work of Ivan Zarudny. The main building is a traditional muscovite octagon on a square (восьмерик на четверике), however, this time there are two coaxial octagons, each crowned with a half-dome.
