= Arise, Russian People! =

Song composed by Sergei Prokofiev

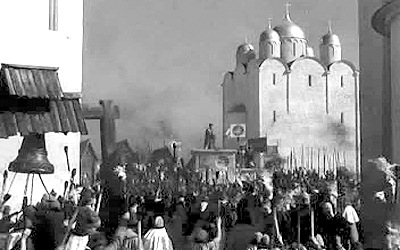
Scene from the film Alexander Nevsky

"Arise, Russian People!" (Russian: Вставайте, люди русские!, romanized: Vstavayte, lyudi russkiye!) is a patriotic song from the Soviet film Alexander Nevsky (1938) directed by Sergei Eisenstein. The music is composed by Sergei Prokofiev, with lyricist Vladimir Lugovskoy.

"Arise, Russian people!" is also the fourth movement of the Prokofiev cantata "Alexander Nevsky" (adapted from the film score in 1939), which has seven parts: "Russia under the Mongolian Yoke," "Song about Alexander Nevsky," "Crusaders in Pskov," "Arise, Russian People!" "Battle of the Ice," "Field of the Dead," and "Alexander's Entry into Pskov." In the primary theme of "Arise, Russian People!" Prokofiev makes use of ancient Russian motifs and evokes sounds of traditional Russian musical instruments.

== See also ==
- "The Sacred War"
- If War Comes Tomorrow
