= Ilya Selvinsky =

Soviet writer (1899–1968)

- Илья Сельвинский
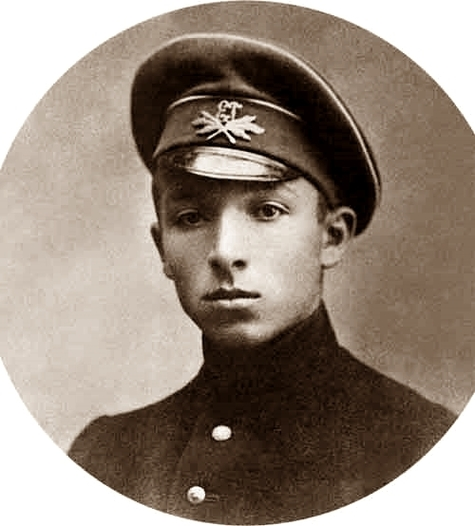
- Selvinsky in 1910
- Born: October 24, 1899; Simferopol, Russian Empire
- Died: 22 March 1968; Moscow, Soviet Union
- Resting place: Novodevichy Cemetery
- Education: Moscow State University
- Occupations: Poet, dramatist, essayist
- Awards: Order of the Patriotic War; Order of the Red Banner of Labour; Order of the Red Star; Medal "For the Defence of Moscow"; Medal "For the Victory over Germany in the Great Patriotic War 1941–1945"

Ilya Lvovich Selvinsky (Russian: Илья Львович Сельвинский, 24 October 1899 – 22 March 1968) was a Soviet poet, dramatist, memoirist, and essayist born in Simferopol, Crimea.

== Biography ==
Selvinsky grew up in Yevpatoria in a Jewish family. His father was a furrier merchant. In 1919, Selvinsky graduated from a gymnasium in Yevpatoria, spending his summers as a vagabond and trying his hands at different trades, including sailing, fishing, working as a longshoreman and circus wrestler, and acting in an itinerant theater.

Selvinsky published his first poem in 1915 and in the 1920s experimented with the use of Yiddishisms and thieves' lingo in Russian verse. He is credited with innovations in Russian versification, including the proliferation of taktovik, a Russian nonclassical meter. Extensive travel and turbulent adventures fueled Selvinsky's longer narrative works and cycles, "loadified" (term used by the Russian constructivists) with local color. Selvinsky briefly joined the anarchist troops in the Russian Civil War but later fought on the side of the Reds. He moved to Moscow in 1921 and studied law at Moscow University, graduating in 1922. From 1924 until its dismantlement in 1930, Selvinsky was the leader of the Literary Center of Constructivists (LTsK), an early Soviet modernist group, and edited several landmark anthologies by constructivist authors (e.g., The State Plan of Literature). In the late 1920s, the LtsK counted among its members poets Eduard Bagritsky, Vera Inber, and Vladimir Lugovskoy; critic Kornely Zelinsky; prose writer Yevgeny Gabrilovich; and others. In the middle to late 1920s, after the publication of Records, The Lay of Ulyalaev (1924) and the narrative poem Notes of a Poet (1927), Selvinsky achieved fame and acclaim. In 1929, his tragedy Army 2 Commander was staged by Vsevolod Meyerhold. Selvinsky's major early Jewish works include Bar Kokhba (1920, published 1924), a powerful monument to Jewish—and Judaic—survival; "Anecdotes about the Karaite Philosopher Babakai-Sudduk" (1931); "Motke Malech-hamovess [Motke the Angel of Death]" (1926); and The Lay of Ulyalaev. "Portrait of My Mother" (1933) contains a constructivist bitter comment about Jewish-Soviet assimilation: "Henceforth her son's face will remain defiled/Like the Judaic Jerusalem,/Having suddenly become a Christian holy site."

In the late 1930s Selvinsky was an important mentor to the younger generation of Soviet Russian poets. During World War II, Selvinsky served as a military journalist and combat political officer in his native Crimea, North Caucasus, and Kuban. He joined the Communist Party in 1941, and was wounded and decorated for valor. In the poem "I Saw It!" ("Ia eto videl!"), composed in January 1942 and published shortly thereafter, Selvinsky depicted the aftermath of the mass execution, in November–December 1941, of thousands of Jews at the so-called Bagerovo anti-tank ditch outside the Crimean city of Kerch. According to the research of Maxim D. Shrayer, Selvinsky's "I Saw It!" was the first literary text about the Shoah to reach a nationwide audience. In late 1943, lieutenant colonel Selvinsky was summoned to Moscow, punitively dismissed from the army, and subjected to repressions. Especially devastating was the February 10, 1944 resolution of the Secretariat of the Central Committee of the Communist Party, "About I. Selvinsky's Poem 'To whom Russia sang a lullaby….'" In April 1945, Selvinsky's status was finally restored, and he was allowed to return to the frontlines. One of the principal Soviet literary witnesses to the Shoah, Selvinsky treated the topic of the mass extermination of Jews by the Nazis and their accomplices in two other works of 1942, "Kerch" and "A Reply to Goebbels," and in other wartime poems. Selvinsky's long poem Kandava (1945) unfolds around a nightmare in which he imagines himself and his wife "somewhere in Auschwitz/or Maidanek."

Through a combination of personal bravery and political navigation, Selvinsky weathered the storms of Stalinism. He remained a proud Jew during the most antisemitic of the Soviet years and despite direct official ostracism. Shortly before his death, Selvinsky published the autobiographical novel O My Youth (1966), where Jewish themes figured prominently. He lived in Writers' House in Lavrushinsky Lane. Selvinsky died in Moscow in 1968 and was buried at the Novodevichy Cemetery.

A poetic virtuoso of high caliber, Selvinsky holds a prominent place in the history of modern Russian poetry and in the history of Jewish literature and Shoah literature. Selvinsky's uneclipsed literary achievements include the epic poem The Lay of Ulyalaev and the novel in verse Fur Trade (1928).
