= Dobryninskaya =

Moscow Metro station

Dobryninskaya Добрынинская
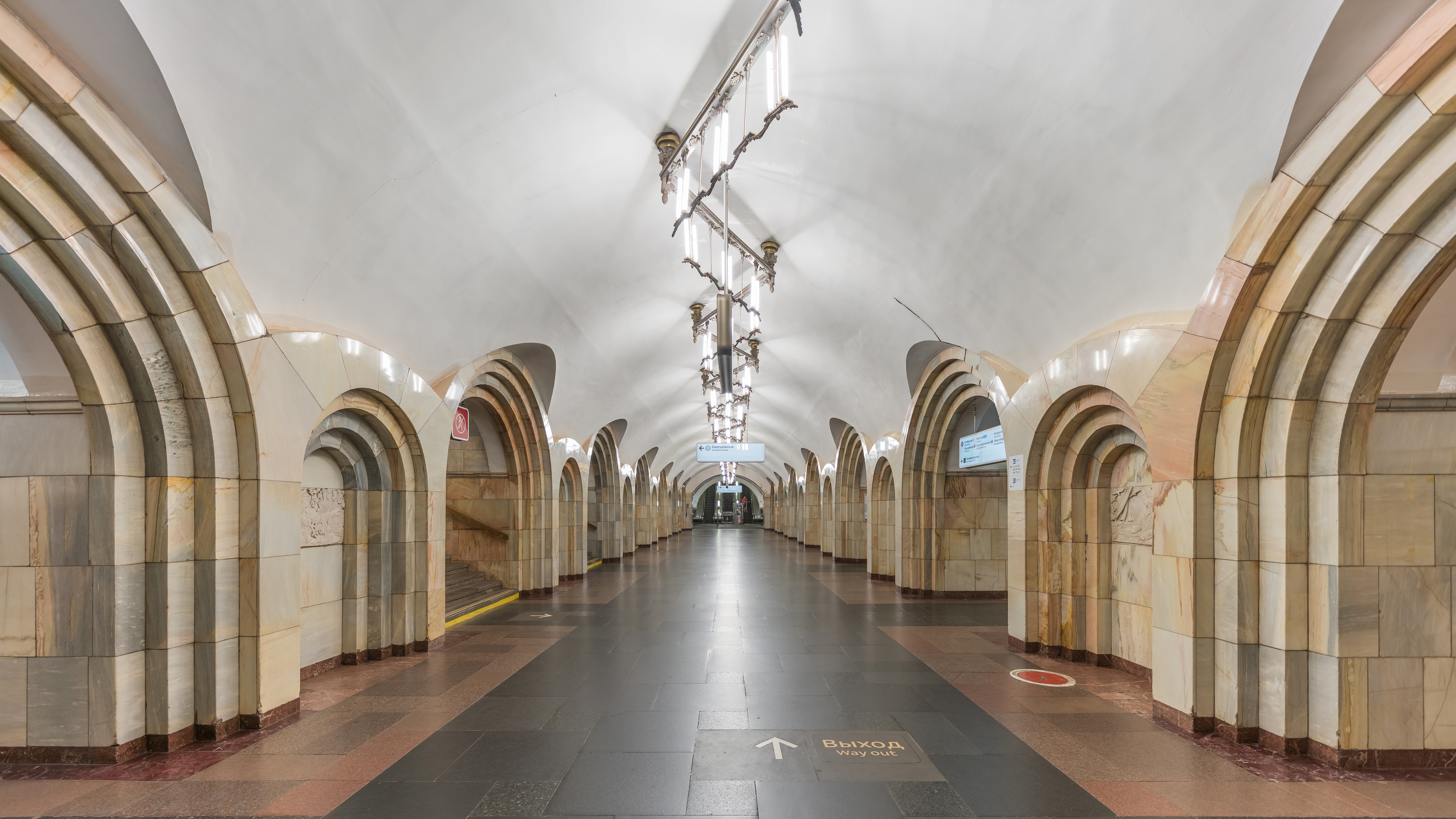

General information
- Location: Zamoskvorechye District; Central Administrative Okrug; Moscow; Russia
- Coordinates: 55.7291°N 37.6243°E
- System: Moscow Metro station
- Owner: Moskovsky Metropoliten
- Line: Koltsevaya line
- Platforms: 1
- Tracks: 2

Construction
- Depth: 35.5 metres (116 ft)
- Platform levels: 1
- Parking: No

Other information
- Station code: 074

History
- Opened: 1 January 1950; 76 years ago
- Former names: Serpukhovskaya

Passengers
- 2002: 12,702,000

Services
Preceding station	Moscow Metro	Following station
Paveletskaya anticlockwise / outer	Koltsevaya line	Oktyabrskaya clockwise / inner
Polyanka towards Altufyevo	Serpukhovsko-Timiryazevskaya line transfer at Serpukhovskaya	Tulskaya towards Bulvar Dmitriya Donskogo
Route map
Location
- Location within Central Moscow

Dobryninskaya (Russian: Добры́нинская) is a station on the Koltsevaya Line of the Moscow Metro. Opened on 1 January 1950 it was part of the first segment of the fourth stage of the system. It was originally named Serpukhovskaya (Russian: Серпуховская), after the Serpukhovskaya Square.

== History ==
On 6 June 1961 the station was renamed in honour of Peter Dobrynin a bust of whom was placed in front of the vestibule. In 1983, the station Serpukhovskaya of the Serpukhovsko-Timiryazevskaya Line was opened (also a work of Popov) and a transfer-passage was created from the middle of Dobryninskaya to the middle of the new station. On 22 December 2006 the vestibule was closed for nearly 18 months during which time the old escalators were replaced, new turnstiles were installed and a complete overhaul of all communication systems, new security and a thorough restoration was carried out. The renewed vestibule was re-opened on 11 June 2008.

== Architecture ==
The station has a pylon trivault built in the flamboyant architecture style of the late 1940s — early 1950s. Architect Leonid Popov and co-authors M. Zelenin and M. Ilin based their design on themes inspired by the city of Serpukhov, with the overall design referring to ancient Russian architecture and in particular the Church of the Intercession on the Nerl, which is repeated in the design of the portals and the beige marble composition.

Other innovations by Popov include the station walls on the platform halls where (above dark red marble) run white cylindrical marble plinths designed to reflect directly into the eyes of passengers. To keep the bright and light appearance of the station, the vaults of the station were left simply plastered and painted white, with lighting coming from a zigzag arrangement of horizontal fluorescent tubes. The floor is a dark grey granite, typical of older Orthodox Churches.

Contrasting with the ancient connotations are 12 bas-reliefs on the pylons by Yelena Yason-Manizer depicting traditional labours (hunting, fishing, grape-picking etc.) of different nationalities of the Soviet Union. Yelena Yason-Manizer was also sculptor of the original bas-relief at the end of the station which featured a large profile of Joseph Stalin and Coat of Arms of the Soviet Union. This was removed in 1961 and in 1967 replaced with the present mosaic by the same artist, titled Morning of the Cosmic Era.

Further works of Popov (and co-architect Tatarzhinskaya) include the station's large vestibule, located on the corner of Lyusinovskaya Street and Serpukhovskaya Square. Like the platform halls the portico was based on medieval Russian themes and the pilaster was copied from an archaeological discovery in Taman that dates to Byzantine times. The interior of the vestibule again depicts patriotic Soviet themes including three large floor-to-ceiling mosaics (artists G. Rublev and B. Iordansky). The central piece is a large banner with a profile of Vladimir Lenin and the 16 Coats of Arms of Soviet Socialist Republics, flanked by feature images of two Parades on Red Square: on the left Sports in Soviet Union|Soviet athletes and on the right the Soviet Military. This once featured a portrait of Stalin being carried; like the bas-relief in the Central Hall, this was removed in 1961 and carefully replaced with an image of Yuri Gagarin. Other features of the vestibules include the majestic blue torchieres which flank the escalator ascend and a massive chandelier which is adorned with a large red glass star.

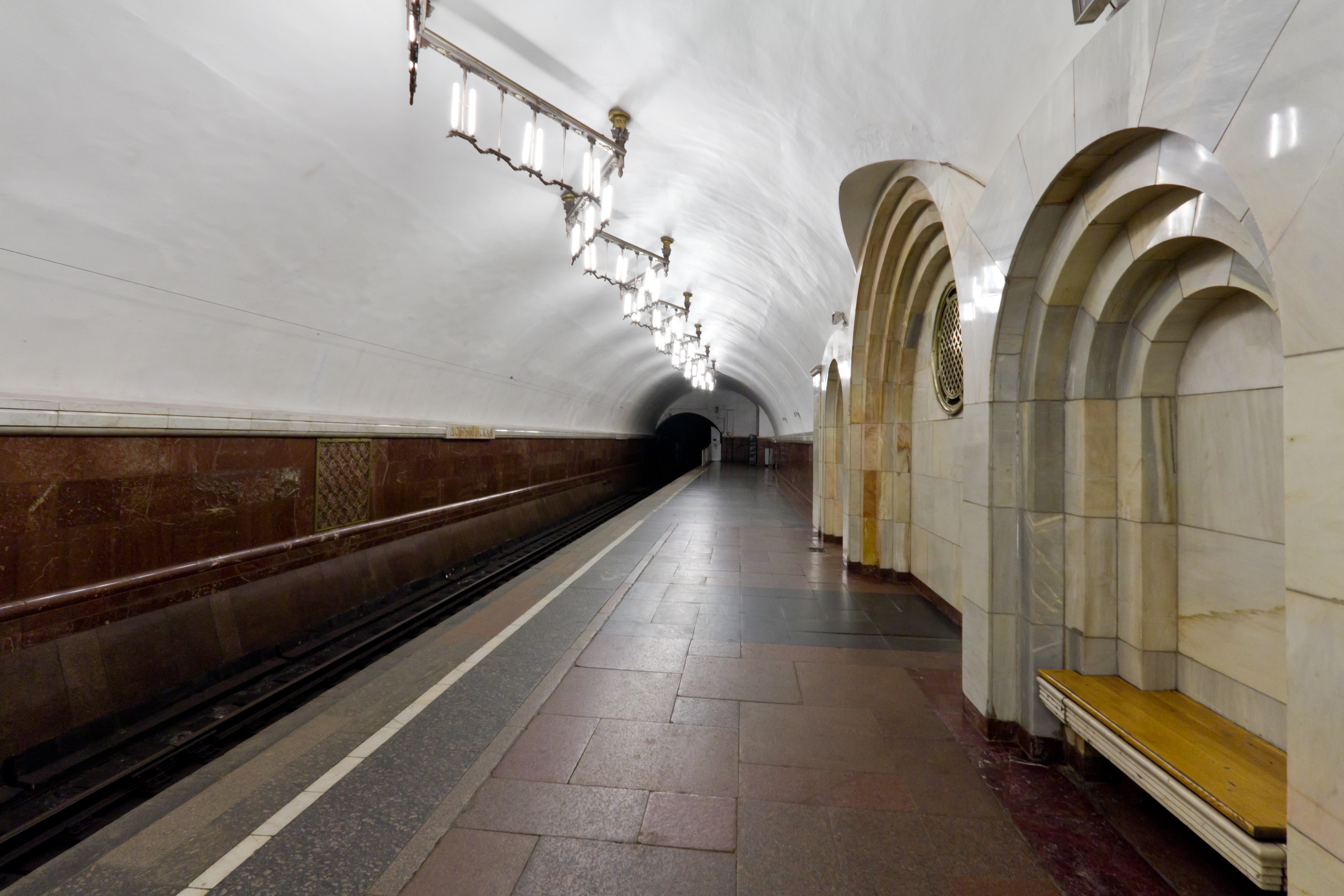
Platform of Dobryninskaya

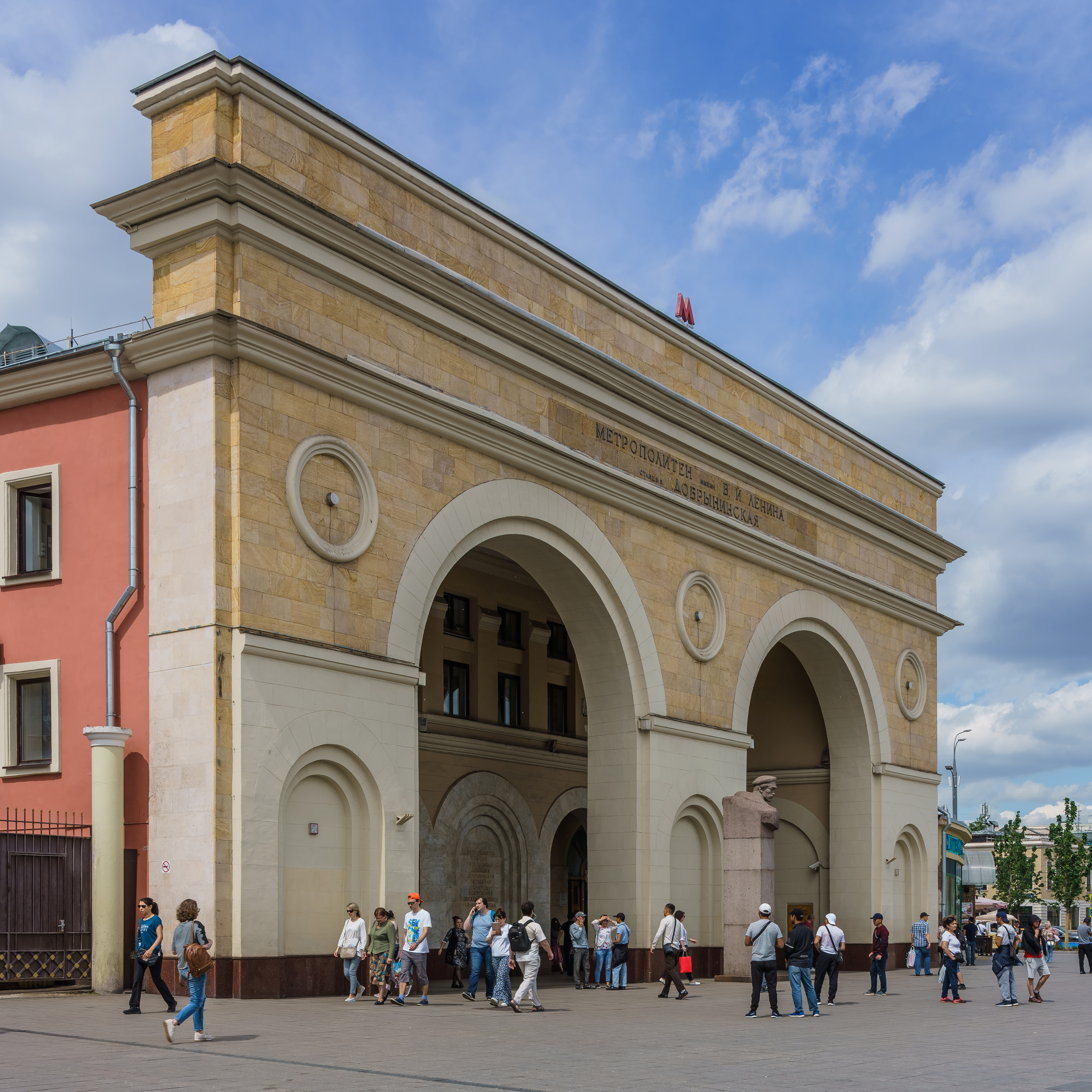
Entrance pavilion
