= Ivan Zarudny =

Baroque era wood-carver from Ukraine

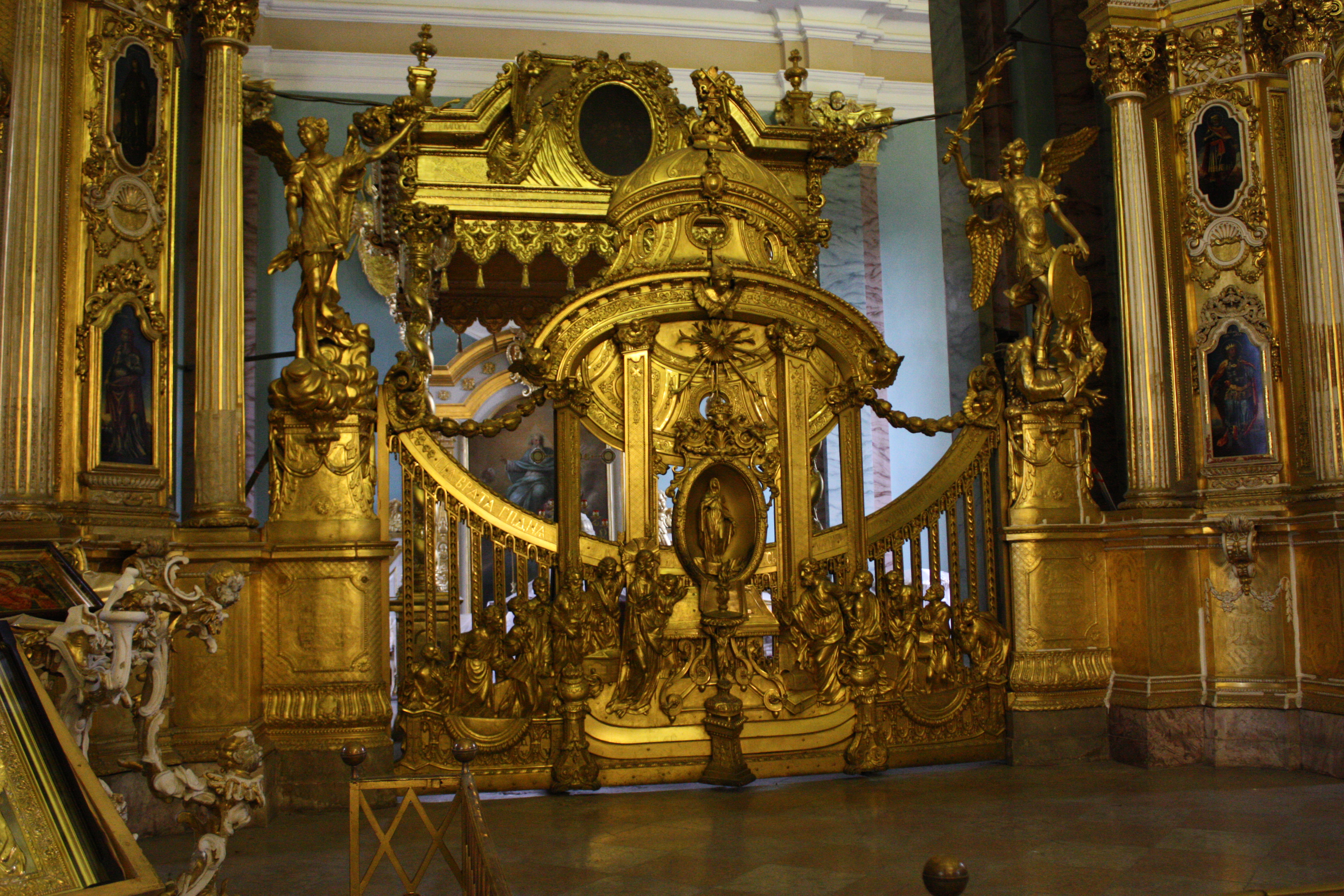
The icon screen of the Peter and Paul Cathedral has been attributed to Zarudny

Ivan Petrovich Zarudny was a Baroque wood-carver and icon-painter from Sloboda Ukraine who was active in Moscow in the reign of Peter the Great. Among his works are several elaborate icon screens and triumphal arches built in wood to celebrate Peter's victory in the Battle of Poltava. Very little is known about him. In the Soviet years much of early Petrine Baroque architecture in the Moscow region, including the Menshikov Tower and the Church of St. John the Warrior, was attributed to this mysterious figure. In more recent works Zarudny has been "classed as a skillful woodcarver and icon-painter in the employ of European masters imported by Peter I".
