= Kadashi Church =

Naryshkin Baroque church in Moscow

Coordinates: 55°44′35″N 37°37′20″E

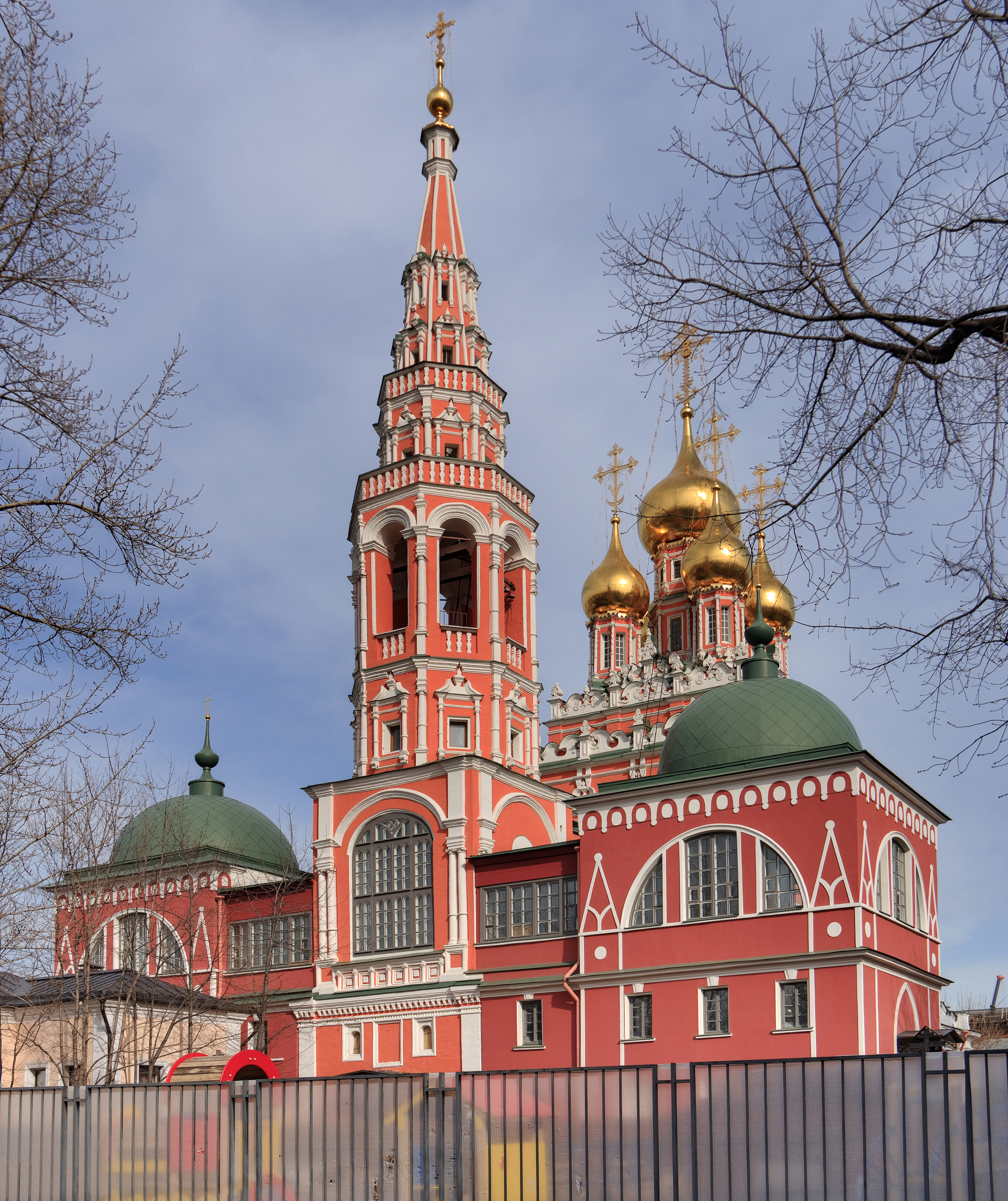
Church of Christ's Resurrection, Kadashi

The Resurrection Church in Kadashi Sloboda (Храм Воскресения Христова в Кадашах) is a major Naryshkin Baroque church in Moscow (Yakimanka District), formerly the tallest building in Zamoskvorechye. It may still be seen from Red Square.

A wooden church on this site was documented as early as 1493. The elongated five-domed church with an elegantly "laced" belfry was constructed between 1687 and 1695. The interior was frescoed in the late 17th century. Napoleon's soldiers desecrated the church, turning it into a stables. In the 19th century, the icon screen was restored, the galleries and apses were expanded, and several outsize domed porches were added. The church was closed by the Soviets in 1934 and was adapted for accommodation of a KGB archive. It was not returned to the Russian Orthodox Church until December 2006.

There was much media focus on the Kadashi Church in 2010 when Moscow mayor, Yuri Luzhkov, ordered the demolition of several old buildings near the church, including a deacon's house from 1813, in order to replace them with an elite apartment complex. The decision was viewed as Luzhkov's latest attack on Moscow's architectural heritage in the interests of building companies and sparked a resistance campaign labelled the "battle of Kadashi" by the Russian media.
