= Writers' House in Lavrushinsky Lane =

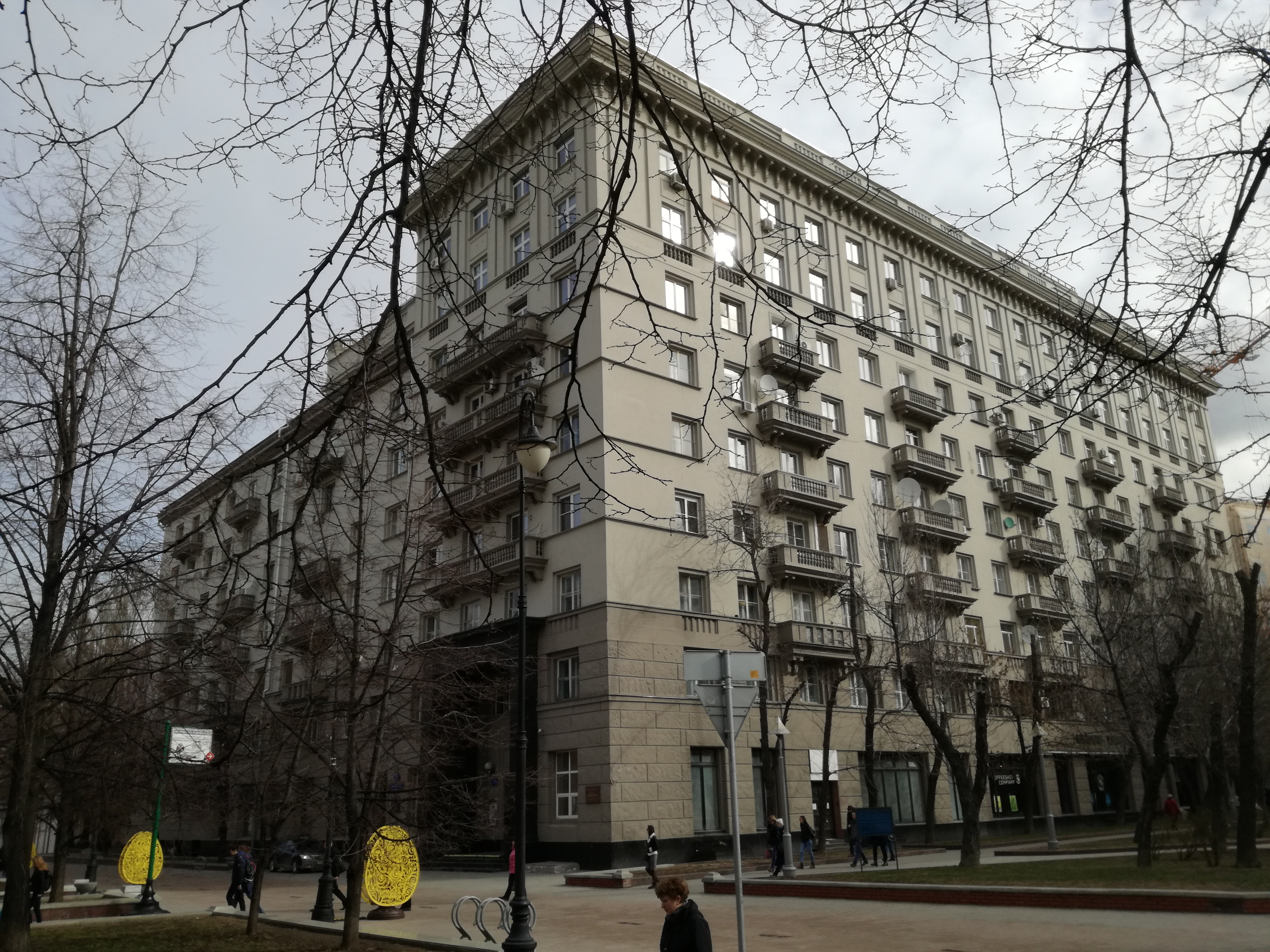
- Interactive map of the Writers' House in Lavrushinsky Lane area

General information
- Location: 17 Lavrushinsky Lane Moscow, Russia
- Coordinates: 55°44′28″N 37°37′19″E
- Completed: 1937

The Writers' House in Lavrushinsky Lane (Russian: Дом писателей в Лаврушинском переулке) is a residential building located in Moscow, Russia, an architectural monument and a cultural heritage site of Russia of regional significance.

== History ==
In the 1660s, the site where the building is currently located was granted to the service nobleman Semyon Titov. He erected stone chambers that have survived to this day.

The 1935 General Plan for the Reconstruction of Moscow included the idea of extending the Boulevard Ring to Zamoskvorechye, the route of which was to pass, among other things, along Ordynsky Dead End and cross Lavrushinsky Lane. As part of the implementation of this idea, sites for the construction of new buildings along the red lines of the planned ring were outlined in Zamoskvorechye District. One of them was the site at the corner of Lavrushinsky Lane and Ordynsky Dead End where on the site of the outbuildings and other buildings, it was decided to build a residential building.

The leadership of the Union of Soviet Writers had to make a lot of efforts to achieve the transfer of the land allocated for construction to the housing and construction writers' cooperative "Soviet Writer". At the same time, renting apartments was not cheap: from 8,000 to 20,000 Soviet rubles.

The first stage of the house was completed in 1937 with significant shortcomings that were corrected only after the Great Patriotic War. At the same time, construction of the second stage began.

The writers Margarita Aliger, Agniya Barto, David Bergelson, Vladimir Bill-Belotserkovsky, Mikhail Bubennov, Pyotr Vershigora, Nikolai Virta, Vsevolod Vishnevsky, Valeria Gerasimova, Fyodor Gladkov, Nikolai Gribachev, Ilya Ilf, Veniamin Kaverin, Emmanuil Kazakevich, Lev Kassil, Valentin Kataev, Semyon Kirsanov, Fyodor Knorre, Vladimir Lugovskoy, Anton Makarenko, Lev Nikulin, Pavel Nilin, Yury Olesha, Lev Oshanin, Boris Pasternak (apt. 72), Konstantin Paustovsky, Yevgeny Petrov, Nikolai Pogodin, Mikhail Prishvin, Ilya Selvinsky, Vladimir Sokolov, Stanislav Stande, Konstantin Fedin, Vladimir Chivilikhin, Viktor Shklovsky, Stepan Shchipachev, Ilya Ehrenburg, Alexander Yashin, literary critics Osaf Litovsky, Iosif Yuzovsky, literary scholar Dmitry Blagoy, singer Lidia Ruslanova (apt. 39) and others.
