= Polyanka (Moscow Metro) =

Moscow Metro station

Polyanka Полянка
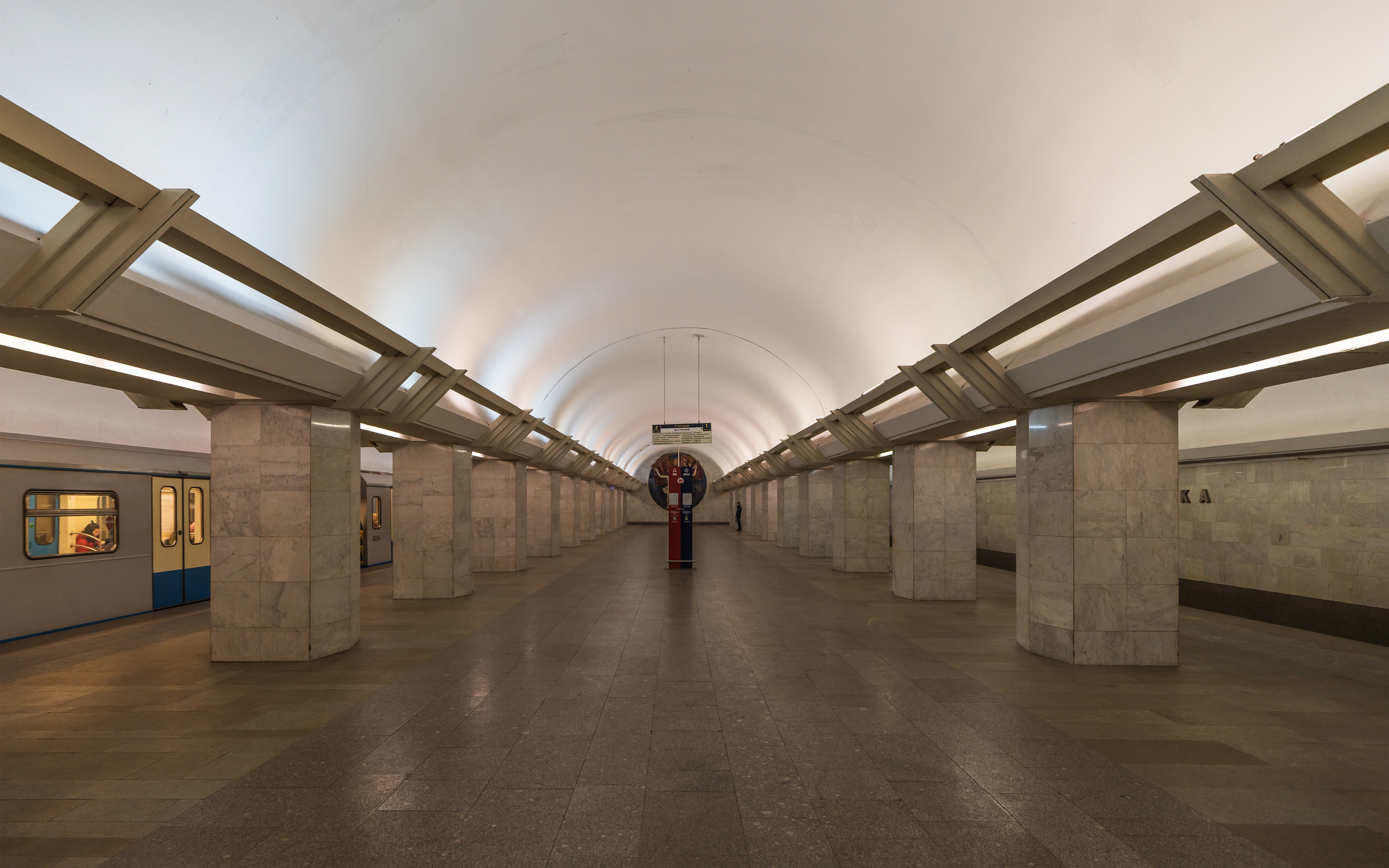

General information
- Location: Yakimanka District, Central Administrative Okrug; Moscow; Russia
- Coordinates: 55.7379°N 37.6180°E
- System: Moscow Metro station
- Owner: Moskovsky Metropoliten
- Line: Serpukhovsko-Timiryazevskaya line
- Platforms: 1
- Tracks: 2
- Connections: Trolleybus: 1

Construction
- Structure type: Column triple-vault
- Depth: 36.5 metres (120 ft)
- Platform levels: 1
- Parking: No

Other information
- Station code: 141

History
- Opened: 23 January 1986; 40 years ago

Services
Preceding station	Moscow Metro	Following station
Borovitskaya towards Altufyevo	Serpukhovsko-Timiryazevskaya line	Serpukhovskaya towards Bulvar Dmitriya Donskogo
Route map
Location
- Location within Central Moscow

Polyanka (Russian: Полянка) is a Moscow Metro station in the Yakimanka District, Central Administrative Okrug, Moscow, Russia. It is on the Serpukhovsko-Timiryazevskaya Line. It was opened in 1986. The station is a column-trivault, with a large sculpture presenting a couple with a child, inside a circle, at the end.

A transfer to the Kaluzhsko-Rizhskaya line at Yakimanka station was planned in the 1980s. The station was supposed to open between the mid-1990s and the early 2000s. The construction would have start in 1996 and be finished in 2000. It was later cancelled and the completion of the station has not yet to be occurred until further notice.

== Gallery ==
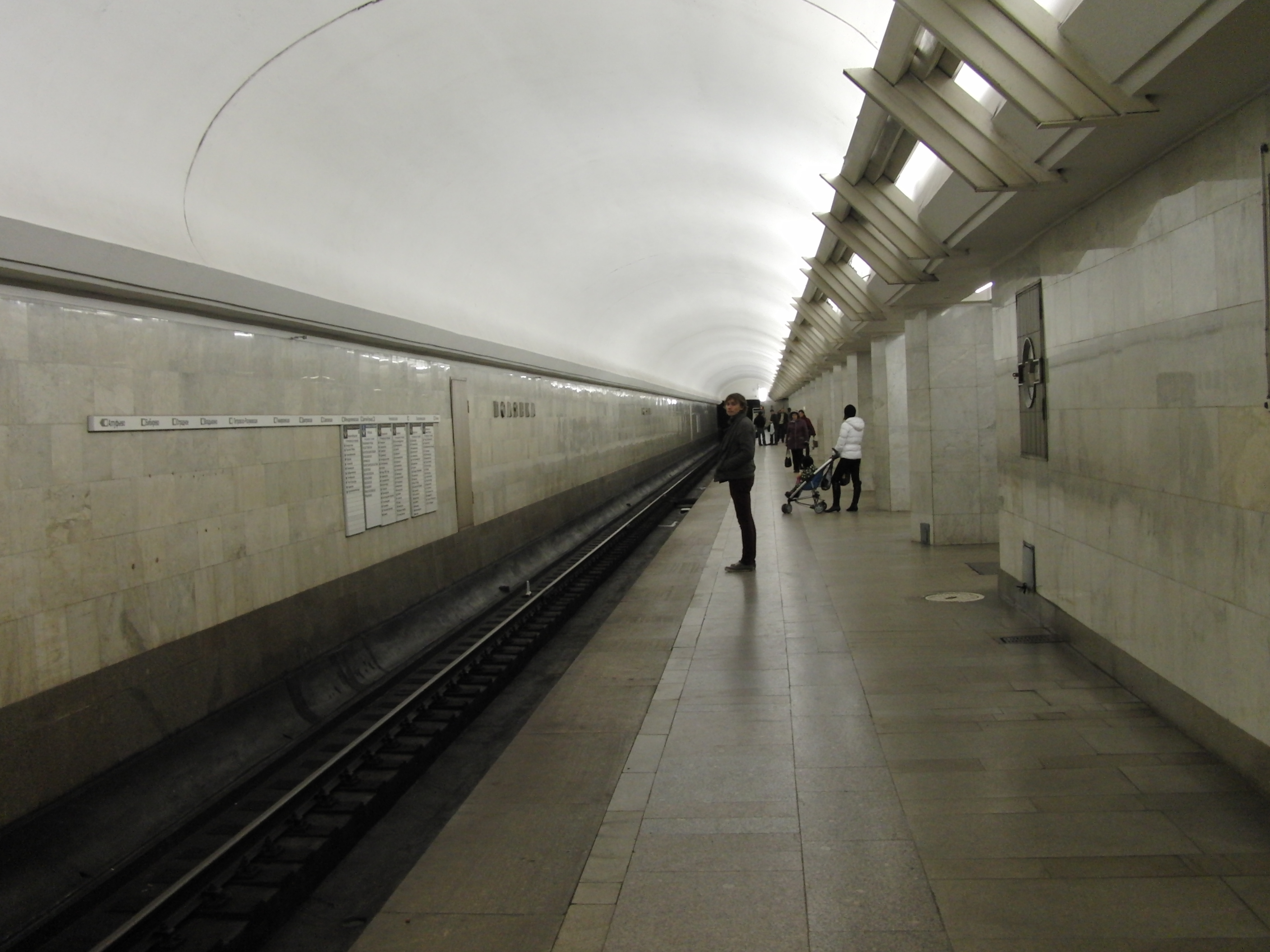
Station platform

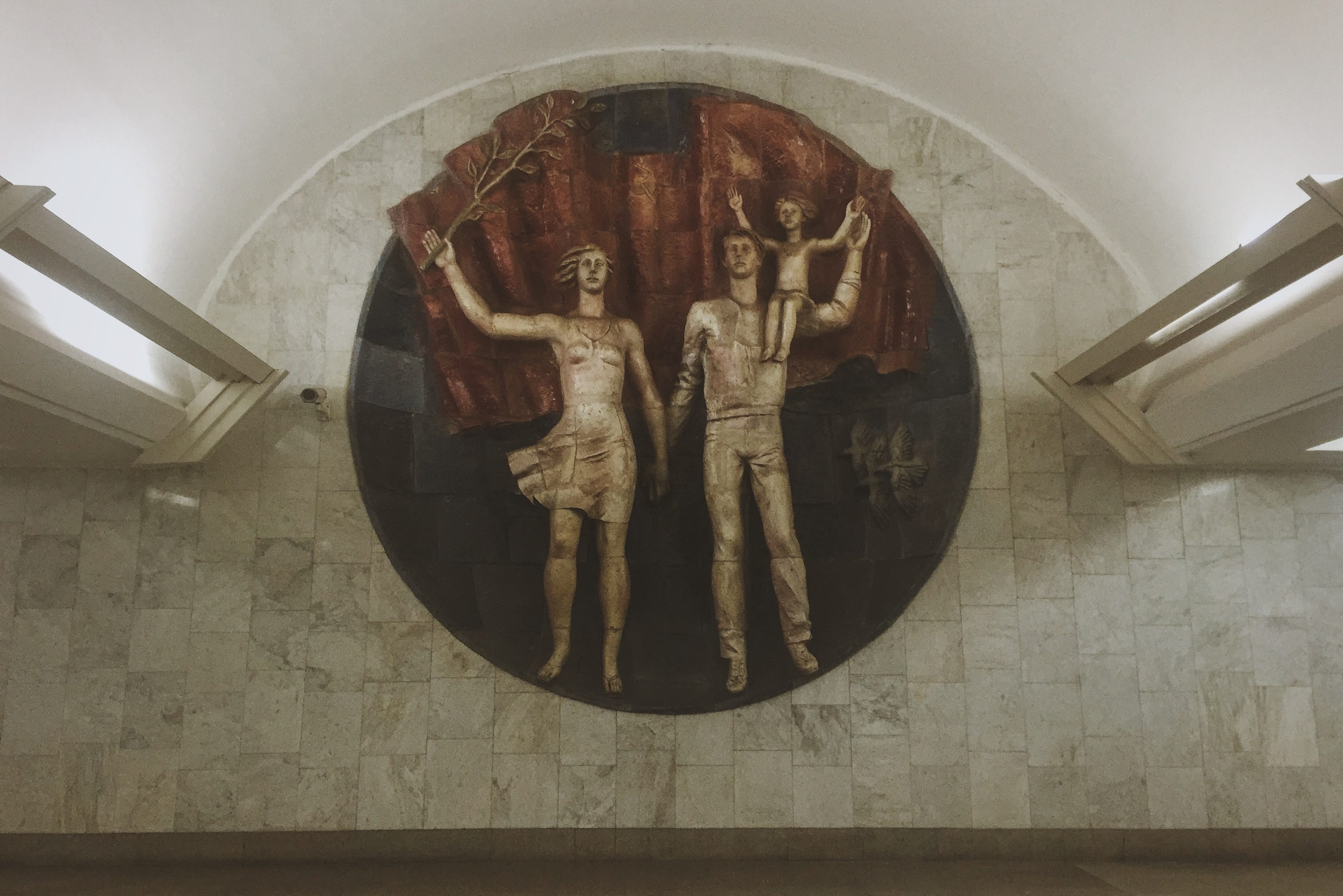
A sculpture at the end of the platform
