= Vladimir Lugovskoy =

- Владимир Луговской
- Born: 1 July 1901; Moscow, Russian Empire
- Died: 5 June 1957 (aged 55); Yalta, Soviet Union
- Resting place: Novodevichy Cemetery
- Education: Vsevobuch
- Occupations: Poet, journalist
- Awards: Order of the Badge of Honour

Vladimir Alexandrovich Lugovskoy (Russian: Влади́мир Алекса́ндрович Луговско́й; July 1, 1901 Moscow - June 5, 1957 Yalta) was a Russian constructivist poet.

Born in to the family of a teacher of the First Moscow Gymnasium and a mother who was a professional singer. He graduated from the gymnasium and entered the Moscow State University but his studies were cut short after he was enrolled in the Red Army's Western Front and served in a field hospital.

After returning from the front he started study at the general school of Vsevobuch. He served in the department of internal affairs of the Kremlin and in the military school of the All-Russian Central Executive Committee. The Russian Revolution, the subsequent Civil War, Russian history and the nature of the North, where the poet's father came from, formed the initial circle of impressions and poetic images of V.A Lugovsky.

Lugovskoy began writing poetry in 1924 and associated himself with the constructivists. In 1930 he joined the Russian Association of Proletarian Writers and became a member of the editorial staff of the magazine "Znamya". Among his better known works is the choir of "Arise, Russian People!" for the film Alexander Nevsky.

He participated as a war correspondent in the Polish campaign of the Soviet Union in 1939. However he didn't participate in World War II due to his health complications and was evaluated to Tashkent in 1941.

He lived at the Writers' House in Lavrushinsky Lane. Vladimir Lugovskoy died on June 5, 1957, in Yalta . He is buried in Moscow at the Novodevichy Cemetery. His daughter Maria (1930–2004) and her husband Valentin Sedov were prominent archaeologists.

== Works ==
- Flashes. - M .: Uzel, 1926;
- Muscle. - M .: Federation, 1929 (the collection is full of rational pathos of self-giving to the masses);
- The suffering of my friends. - M .: Federation, 1930;
- To the Bolsheviks of the desert and spring. - M., 1930, 1931, 1933, 1934, 1937, 1948;
- Poems (1923-1930). - M., 1931;
- Europe. - M .: Federation, 1932 (collection of publicistic poems);
- East and West. - M., 1932;
- Selected Poems. - M., 1932;
- A life. - M .: Soviet Literature, 1933;
- Selected Poems. - M., 1935;
- One-volume work. - M., 1935;
- Caspian Sea. - M .: Goslitizdat, 1936;
- New poems. - M., 1941;
- Poems and poems. - Simferopol, 1941;
- Favorites. - M., 1949;
- Poems about Uzbekistan. - Tashkent, 1949;
- Owners of the land. - M., 1949;
- Poems. - M., Goslitizdat, 1952;
- Desert and Spring (1937–52). - M., Soviet writer, 1953;
- Crimean poems. - Simferopol, 1954;
- Lyrics. - M .: Soviet writer, 1955;
- Song of the Wind. - M., 1955;
- Poems about Turkmenistan. - Ashgabat, 1955;
- Solstice. - M., Soviet writer, 1956;
- Middle of the century, 1958 (lyric-epic work, consisting of 25 poems)
- Blue Spring, 1958;
- Meditation on Poetry, 1960
