= Serpukhovskaya =

Moscow Metro station

Serpukhovskaya Серпуховская
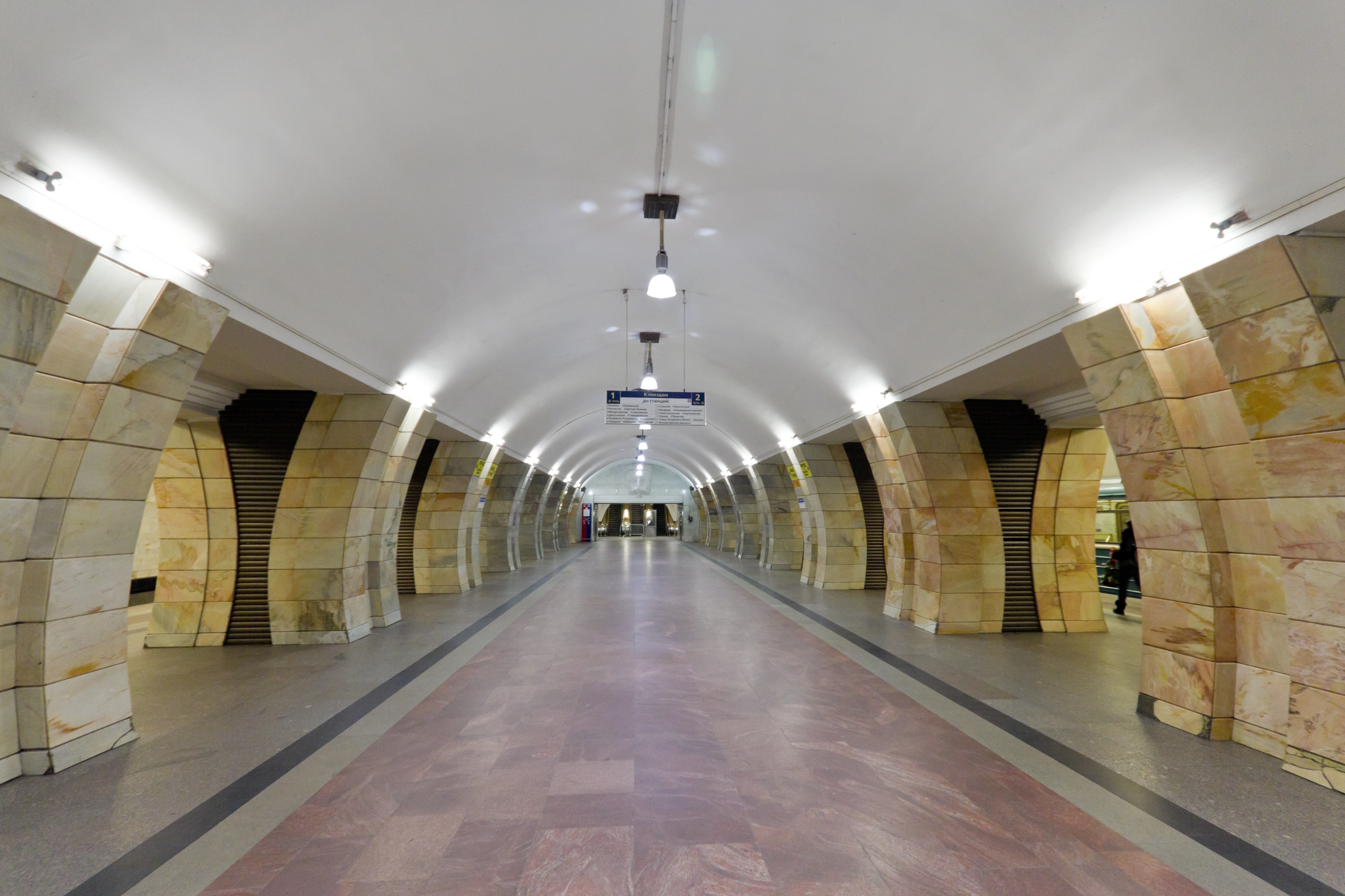

General information
- Location: Zamoskvorechye District, Central Administrative Okrug; Moscow; Russia
- Coordinates: 55.7280°N 37.6246°E
- System: Moscow Metro station
- Owner: Moskovsky Metropoliten
- Line: Serpukhovsko-Timiryazevskaya line
- Platforms: 1
- Tracks: 2
- Connections: Trolleybus: 1

Construction
- Structure type: Column triple-vault
- Depth: 43 metres (141 ft)
- Platform levels: 1
- Parking: No

Other information
- Station code: 142

History
- Opened: 8 November 1983; 42 years ago

Services
Preceding station	Moscow Metro	Following station
Polyanka towards Altufyevo	Serpukhovsko-Timiryazevskaya line	Tulskaya towards Bulvar Dmitriya Donskogo
Paveletskaya anticlockwise / outer	Koltsevaya line transfer at Dobryninskaya	Oktyabrskaya clockwise / inner
Route map
Location
- Location within Central Moscow

Serpukhovskaya (Russian: Серпуховска́я) is a Moscow Metro station in the Zamoskvorechye District, Central Administrative Okrug, Moscow, Russia. It is on the Serpukhovsko-Timiryazevskaya Line. The station opened on November 8, 1983. Serpukhovskaya is 43 metres (141 feet) underground. Its name originates from the namesake street, which in turn originates from the historic town of Serpukhov.

== Station design ==
Serpukhovskaya station was designed by Nina Aleshina with Leonid N. Pavlov and Lydia Y. Gonchar (Russian: Лидия Юрьевна Гончар). The station features grey and white vaults. There is a three-vault span with white marble lines in the main hallway. The bottoms of the columns holding the ceiling are clad in marble carved so as to look like brick and stone. The shiny textures and surfaces cause intense light reflection. A string of lights hung in the main archway; it was dismantled on 2 March 2006.

== Line transfers ==
Serpukhovskaya offers a transfer to the Dobryninskaya station of the Koltsevaya Line.
