= List of hyperboloid structures =

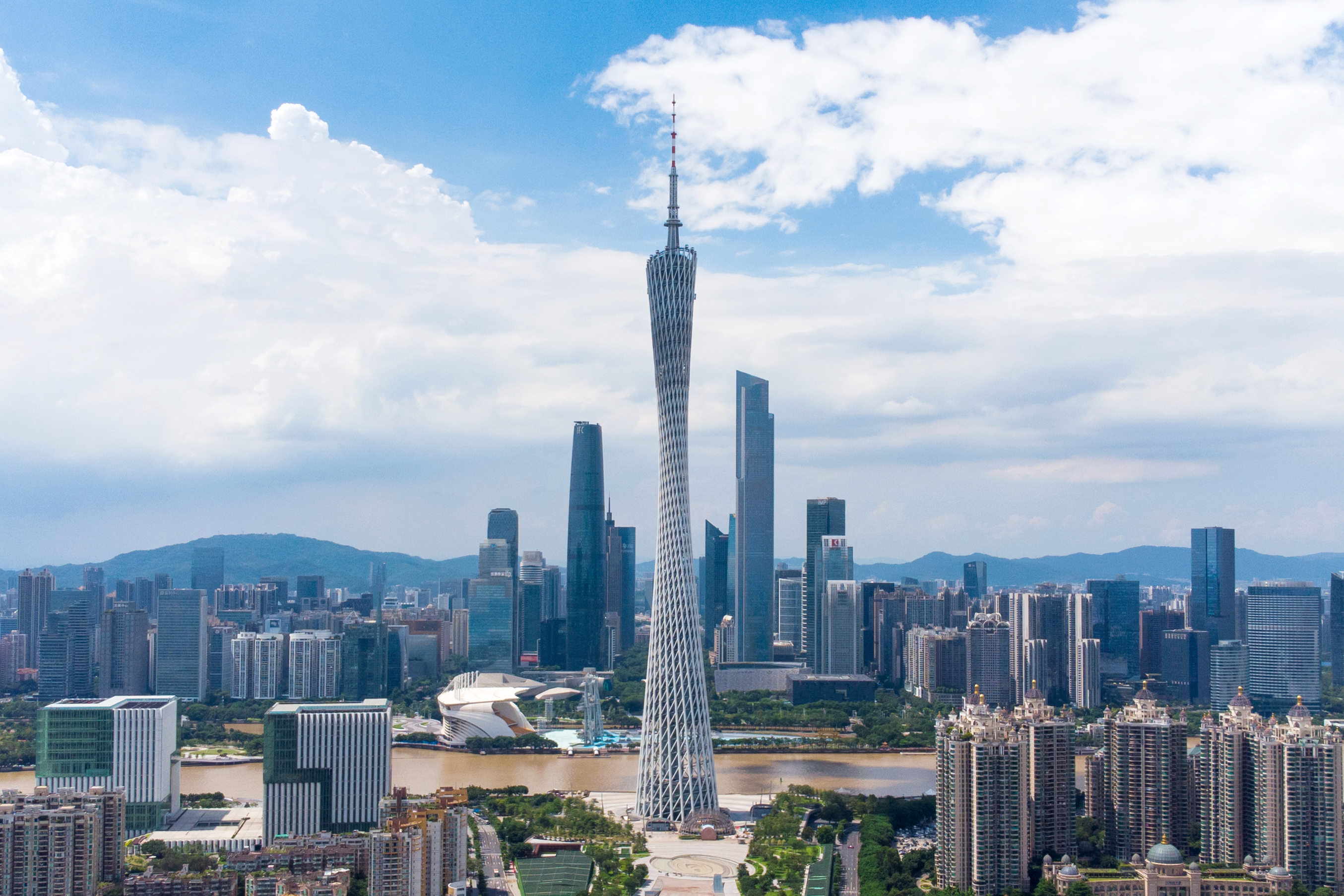
Canton Tower, Guangzhou, China

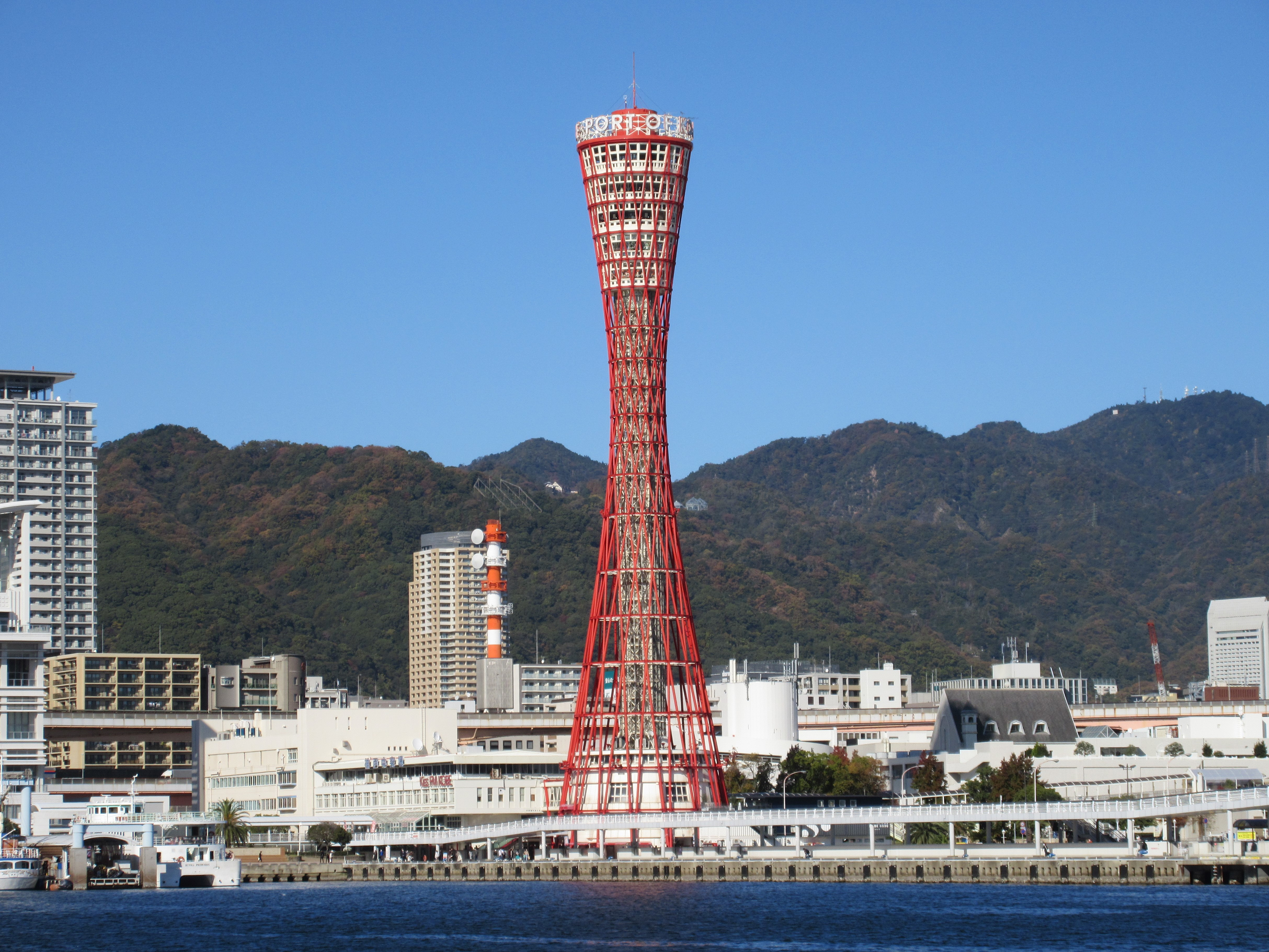
Kobe Port Tower, Kobe, Japan

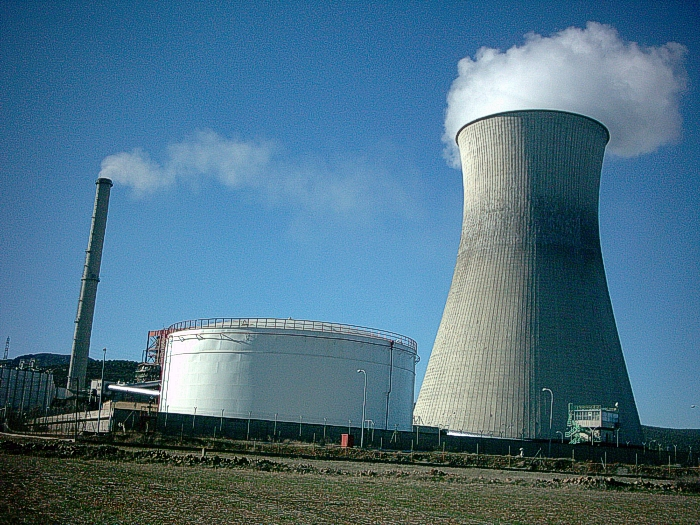
Cooling tower, Puertollano, Spain

This is a list of hyperboloid structures. These were first applied in architecture by Russian engineer Vladimir Shukhov (1853–1939). Shukhov built his first example as a water tower (hyperbolic shell) for the 1896 All-Russian Exposition. Subsequently, more have been designed by other architects, including Le Corbusier, Antoni Gaudí, Eduardo Torroja, Oscar Niemeyer and Ieoh Ming Pei.

The shapes are doubly ruled surfaces, which can be classed as:

- Hyperbolic paraboloids, such as saddle roofs
- Hyperboloid of one sheet, such as cooling towers
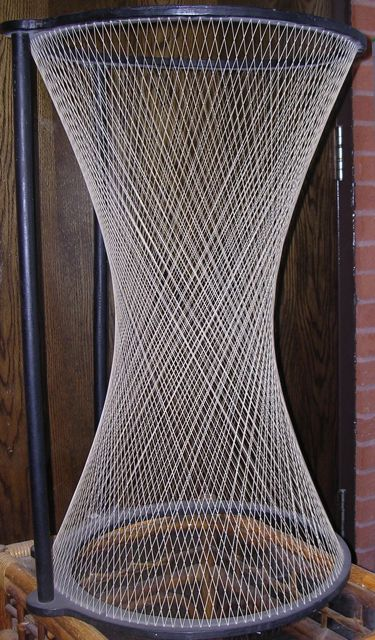
A hyperboloid of one sheet is a doubly ruled surface, and it may be generated by either of two families of straight lines.

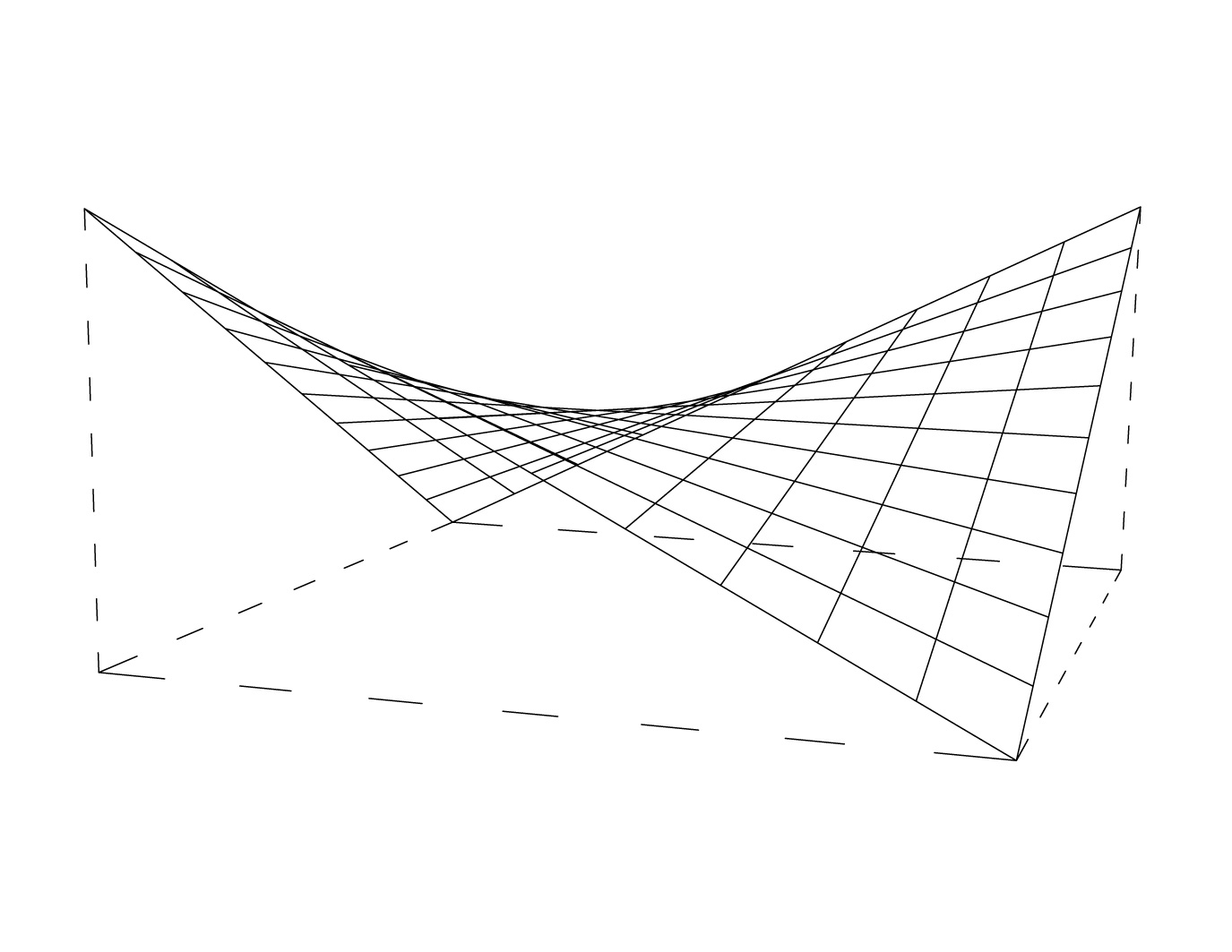
The hyperbolic paraboloid is a doubly ruled surface so it may be used to construct a saddle roof from straight beams.

== Notable projects ==
Structure	Image	Date completed	Location	Country	Function	Height	Architect	Notes
Shukhov Tower in Polibino		1896	Polibino	Russia	Hyperboloid water tower	37 m (121 ft)	Vladimir Shukhov	The world's first hyperboloid structure featured at the 1896 All-Russian Exposition in Nizhny Novgorod, Russia.
Adziogol Lighthouse		1911	Kherson	Ukraine	Hyperboloid lighthouse tower	64 m (211 ft)	Vladimir Shukhov	Illustrates a hyperboloid lattice.
Stanislav Range Front Light		1911	Kherson	Ukraine	Hyperboloid lighthouse tower	26 m (85 ft)	Vladimir Shukhov	
Church of Colònia Güell		1915	Santa Coloma de Cervelló	Spain	Hyperboloid building cathedral vaults		Antoni Gaudí	An unfinished building with hyperbolic paraboloid vaults.
Shukhov Tower		1922	Moscow	Russia	Hyperboloid broadcast tower	160 m (525 ft)	Vladimir Shukhov	Unless the international campaign can save it, the 1922 Shukhov Tower is under current threat of demolition.
Shukhov tower on the Oka River		1929	Nizhny Novgorod	Russia	Hyperboloid electricity pylon towers	128 m (420 ft)	Vladimir Shukhov	The Shukhov Tower on the Oka River is the world's only diagrid hyperboloid electricity pylon transmission tower. In 2005 one tower was illegally taken down to re-sell the metal.
Dorton Arena		1952	Raleigh, North Carolina	United States	Hyperbolic paraboloid saddle roof on arena		Maciej Nowicki	
Transmitter Building of Europe 1		1954	Überherrn	Germany	Hyperbolic paraboloid saddle roof	16 m (52 ft)		transmitter building of a 2000 kW longwave broadcasting transmitter
Fedala Reservoir		1957	Mohammedia	Morocco	Hyperboloid water tower		Eduardo Torroja	
Ochsenkopf TV Tower		1958	Ochsenkopf	Germany	Hyperboloid broadcast tower	163 m (535 ft)		Radio and TV tower made of reinforced concrete.
Philips Pavilion		1958	Brussels, Belgium	Belgium	A cluster of nine hyperbolic paraboloid concrete roofs		Le Corbusier	Commissioned by the Netherlands electronics company Philips, the pavilion at the World's Fair Expo '58 in Brussels was designed by Le Corbusier to house a multimedia spectacle that celebrated postwar technological progress.
Mürwik Wasserturm (Mürwik Water Tower)		1961	Flensburg	Germany	Hyperboloid water tower			
Warszawa Ochota railway station		1962	Warsaw	Poland	Hyperbolic paraboloid saddle roof on train station			
Church Army Chapel, Blackheath		1963	Blackheath, south east London	United Kingdom	Hyperbolic paraboloid saddle roof on church		E.T. Spashett	
Kobe Port Tower		1963	Kōbe	Japan	Hyperboloid observation tower	108 m (354 ft)	Nikken Sekkei Company	
Saint Louis Science Center's James S. McDonnell Planetarium		1963	St. Louis, Missouri	United States	Hyperboloid building museum planetarium		Gyo Obata of Hellmuth, Obata and Kassabaum	
Möglingen Wasserturm (Möglingen Water Tower)		1965	Ludwigsburg	Germany	Hyperboloid water tower		R. Kessler	
Święty Krzyż TV Tower		1966	Łysa Góra	Poland	Hyperboloid broadcast tower	157 m (515 ft)		
Water tower in Rishon LeZion	Hyperboloid water tower in Rishon LeZion	1967	Rishon LeZion	Israel	Hyperboloid water tower	33.5 m (109.9 ft)		
Newcastle International Airport air traffic control tower		1967	Newcastle upon Tyne	United Kingdom	Hyperboloid observation tower			
Cockfosters Water Tower		1968	London	United Kingdom	Hyperboloid water tower		Edmund C. Percey of Scherrer and Hicks and J.W. Milne	Cockfosters Water Tower is in Cockfosters Road, north London, on the edge of Trent Park.
Ještěd Tower		1968	Liberec	Czech Republic	Hyperboloid broadcast tower	94 m (308 ft)	Karel Hubáček	
Wrexham Swimming Baths, now the Wrexham Waterworld Leisure and Activity Centre		1969	Wrexham, Wales	United Kingdom	Hyperbolic paraboloid saddle roof on indoor swimming pool		F.D. Williamson associates of Bridgend	
Cathedral of Brasília		1970	Brasília	Brazil	Hyperboloid building cathedral	42 m (138 ft)	Oscar Niemeyer	
Scandinavium		1971	Gothenburg	Sweden	Hyperbolic paraboloid saddle roof on arena		Poul Hultberg, for Nils Olsson's Gothenburg firm	
Ciechanów Water Tower		1972	Ciechanów	Poland	Hyperboloid water tower		Jan Bogusławski, Jerzy Michał Bogusławski	A toroidal water tower tank on a doubly ruled hyperboloid structure.
Gettysburg National Tower		1974-2000	Gettysburg, Pennsylvania	United States	Hyperboloid observation tower	120 m (390 ft)	Joel H. Rosenblatt	Demolished in 2000.
de:BIZ-Turm (BIS Tower) of the Bank for International Settlements		1977	Basel	Switzerland	Hyperboloid skyscraper tower	69.5 m (228 ft)	Martin Burckhardt	Tower for the untouchables.
Sydney Tower		1981	Sydney	Australia	Hyperboloid observation tower	309 m (1,014 ft)	Donald Crone, Australian	
Le Havre's House of Culture, a.k.a. fr:Le Volcan (salle) (The Volcano (hall/auditorium))		1982	Le Havre	France	Hyperboloid building concert hall		Oscar Niemeyer, Brazilian	
Roy Thomson Hall		1982	Toronto	Canada	Hyperboloid building concert hall		Arthur Erickson and Mathers and Haldenby, Canadian	
Scotiabank Saddledome		1983	Calgary	Canada	Hyperbolic paraboloid saddle roof on indoor arena		Graham McCourt Architects	
THTR-300 thorium nuclear reactor cooling tower		1983	Hamm-Uentrop	Germany	Hyperboloid cooling tower	180 m (590 ft)	Schlaich Bergermann & Partner	The THTR-300 cable-net dry cooling tower for the now decommissioned thorium high-temperature nuclear reactor.
Canada Place		1985	Vancouver, British Columbia	Canada	Hyperbolic paraboloid saddle roofs in series with masts and fabric resembling sails		Zeidler Roberts Partnership in joint venture with Musson Cattell Mackey Partnership and DA Architects + Planners.	Canada Place houses the Vancouver Convention Centre, the Pan Pacific Vancouver Hotel, Vancouver's World Trade Centre, the virtual flight ride FlyOver Canada, and is the main cruise ship terminal for the region.
Tractricious		1988	Fermilab, Batavia, Illinois	United States	Hyperboloid public art sculpture		Robert R. Wilson	The Tractricious sculpture in front of Fermilab's Illinois Accelerator Research Center (IARC), Illinois, designed by Robert R. Wilson who derived the name Tractricious from tracktrix, a curve such that any tangent segment from the tangent point on the curve to the curve's asymptote have constant length, a concept first introduced by Claude Perrault in 1670.
Yangudun Radio and Television Tower		1994	Qingdao	China	Hyperboloid observation tower	108 m (354 ft)		
Corporation Street Bridge		1999	Manchester	United Kingdom	Hyperboloid building enclosed walkway		Hodder + Partners	
Orion Tower		2001	Samara	Russia	Hyperboloid broadcast tower	201 m (660 ft)		Radio and TV steel lattice tower
Killesberg Tower		2001	Stuttgart	Germany	Hyperboloid observation tower	40.4 m (133 ft)	Jörg Schlaich and Schlaich Bergermann Partner	Originally planned for the 1993 World Horticultural Exposition, it was only erected in 2001.
Aussichtsturm Schlossberg (Schlossberg View Tower) a.k.a. Castle Hill Tower		2002	Freiburg im Breisgau	Germany	Hyperboloid observation tower	35 m (115 ft)	Hubert Horbach, Freiburg	
Hitachinaka Power Plant		2003	Hitachinaka	Japan	Hyperboloid smokestack	230 m (754 ft)		
Radio Mast at Krupskoi Street		2003	Perm	Russia	Hyperboloid broadcast tower	180 m (591 ft)		Radio and TV steel lattice tower
Messe Wien Turm / Messeturm (Vienna Trade Fair Tower / Exhibition-tower)		2004	Vienna	Austria	Hyperboloid public art sculpture decorative illuminated tower landmark	63 m (207 ft)	Gustav Peichl, Rudolf F. Weber, Katharina Fröch, Christoph Lechner, Paul Katzberger, Gerhard Moßburger, Norbert Erlach	The largest trade fair in Austria and one of the most important economic factors of Vienna.
Barcelona–El Prat Airport air traffic control tower		2005	El Prat de Llobregat, near Barcelona	Spain	Hyperboloid observation tower		Ricardo Bofill, Spanish	
Borůvka Tower		2005	Chrudim	Czech Republic	Hyperboloid observation tower	18.5 m (61 ft)	Martin Novák and Antonín Olšina	
de:TBZ-Turm (TBZ Tower)		2005	Zürich	Switzerland	Hyperboloid observation tower	13.3 m (47 ft)	Daniel Roth (artist), German	The winner of a 2003 competition had his tower built on the roof of the Zürich's Technical Vocational School. Initially accessible, the observation tower has been closed indefinitely due to student mischief.
Aspire Tower a.k.a. "The Torch Doha"		2007	Doha	Qatar	Hyperboloid skyscraper tower	300 m (984 ft)	Hadi Simaan and AREP and engineer Ove Arup and Partners	
BMW Welt (BMW World)		2007	Munich	Germany	Hyperboloid building event venue and museum		Viennese professor Wolf D. Prix and architect firm Coop Himmelb (l) au	
Tornado Tower a.k.a. the "QIPCO Tower"		2008	Doha	Qatar	Hyperboloid skyscraper tower	195 m (640 ft)		
de:Lörmecke-Turm (Lörmecke Tower)		2008	Warstein, Arnsberg, North Rhine-Westphalia	Germany	Hyperboloid observation tower	35 m (115 ft)	Joh.-Ulrich Blecke and Dr. Ing. Michael Maas	
Slunečná Tower		2009	Velké Pavlovice	Czech Republic	Hyperboloid observation tower	18.6 m (61 ft)	Ing. Martin Novák in cooperation with Antonín Olšina	
Canton Tower a.k.a. Guangzhou Tower		2010	Guangzhou	China	Hyperboloid skyscraper tower	604 m (1,982 ft)	Dutch architects Mark Hemel and Barbara Kuit of Information Based Architecture, together with Arup, the international design, engineering and business consulting firm headquartered in London	The Canton Tower is in the Haizhu District of the city of Guangzhou (historically known as Canton), in Guangdong, China.
Ferrari World Abu Dhabi		2010	Yas Island in Abu Dhabi	United Arab Emirates	Hyperboloid building			the largest space frame structure ever built
de:Jübergturm (Jüberg Tower)		2010	de:Jüberg, Hemer, Märkischer Kreis, Arnsberg, North Rhine-Westphalia	Germany	Hyperboloid observation tower	23.5 m (77 ft)	Beat Müller and Katharina Schewe, Swiss + Birk and Heilmeyer, Stuttgart	The first wooden hyperboloid tower structurally supported only by the outer wood framework.
Khan Shatyry Entertainment Center		2010	Khan Shatyr, Astana	Kazakhstan	Hyperboloid superstructure	150 m (492 ft)	Norman Foster of Foster and Partners	The highest tensile structure in the world.
Lee Valley VeloPark a.k.a. London VeloPark		2011	Queen Elizabeth Olympic Park, East London	United Kingdom	Hyperbolic paraboloid saddle roof on cycling centre arena		Hopkins Architects, Grant Associates	
Mae West (sculpture)		2011	Munich	Germany	Hyperboloid public art sculpture	52 m (171 ft)	Rita McBride	
San Clan		2012	Tankwa Karoo National Park	South Africa	Hyperboloid public art sculpture tower			A temporary tower and ephemeral effigy constructed to intentionally burn in celebration at AfrikaBurn 2012, a Burning Man regional event.
Vysoká u Tachova Tower		2014	Tachov	Czech Republic	Hyperboloid observation tower		Hysek architectural studio	
Perm TV Tower		2016	Perm	Russia	Hyperboloid broadcast tower	275 m (902 ft)		A radio and TV steel lattice tower
Warsaw Spire		2016	Warsaw	Poland	Hyperboloid skyscraper tower	220 m (721 ft)	Jaspers-Eyers Architects and PROJEKT Polsko-Belgijska Pracownia Architektury	The Warsaw Spire is a complex of Neomodern office buildings in Warsaw, Poland.
Camp Adventure		2018	Gisselfeld Klosters forests, between Haslev and Næstved,	Denmark	Hyperboloid observation tower	45 m (148 ft)	EFFEKT Architects	45m spiral walkway.
Vakif Bank Headquarters Tower		2023	Istanbul Financial Center, Istanbul	Turkey	Hyperboloid skyscraper tower	222 m (726 ft)	Tabanlıoğlu Architects	The Vakif Bank Headquarters Tower is a project of Istanbul Financial Center (IFC) office buildings in Istanbul, Turkey.
Les Essarts-le-Roi Château d'Eau (Les Essarts-le-Roi Water Tower)			Les Essarts-le-Roi, Yvelines	France	Hyperboloid water tower			
Gen Coel Building			Heerlerheide, Heerlen	Netherlands	Hyperboloid building public library, shopping, and community centre			Utilizes geothermal mine water ("Mijnwater") heating and cooling. See also: nl:Aardwarmte#Aardwarmte uit mijngangen.
Tempo (sculpture), a.k.a. Samspel (interaction/interplay/teamwork)			Husnes	Norway	Hyperboloid public art sculpture		LEADinc	Commissioned by Hydro Husnes, formerly Sør-Norge Aluminium AS.
Sagrada Família			Barcelona	Spain	Hyperboloid building cathedral vaults and windows		Antoni Gaudí	Under construction since 1882 with an estimated completion in 2026.
Markham Moor Scorer Building		1960	Markham Moor junction	United Kingdom	Café		Sam Scorer	

=== Notable projects never built ===
Structure	Location	Country	Function	Height	Architect	Notes
Burj Al Alam	Business Bay, Dubai	United Arab Emirates	Hyperboloid skyscraper tower	510 m (1,670 ft)	Nikken Sekkei	Cancelled in 2013
Crystal Island	Moscow	Russia	Hyperboloid superstructure	450 m (1,476 ft)	Norman Foster of Foster and Partners	In 2009, due to the 2008 financial crisis, financial backing for the project was lost, and construction of the project was postponed.
Delta Tower	Mexico City	Mexico	Hyperboloid skyscraper tower	350 m (1,148 ft)	S*ARC Salvador Rivas Architects	Designed in 2017
Vortex Tower	London	United Kingdom	Hyperboloid skyscraper tower	300 m (984 ft)	Ken Shuttleworth	Designed in 2012

== Gallery of more hyperbolic paraboloid structures ==
The hyperbolic paraboloid is a doubly ruled surface, and thus can be used to construct a saddle roof from straight beams.

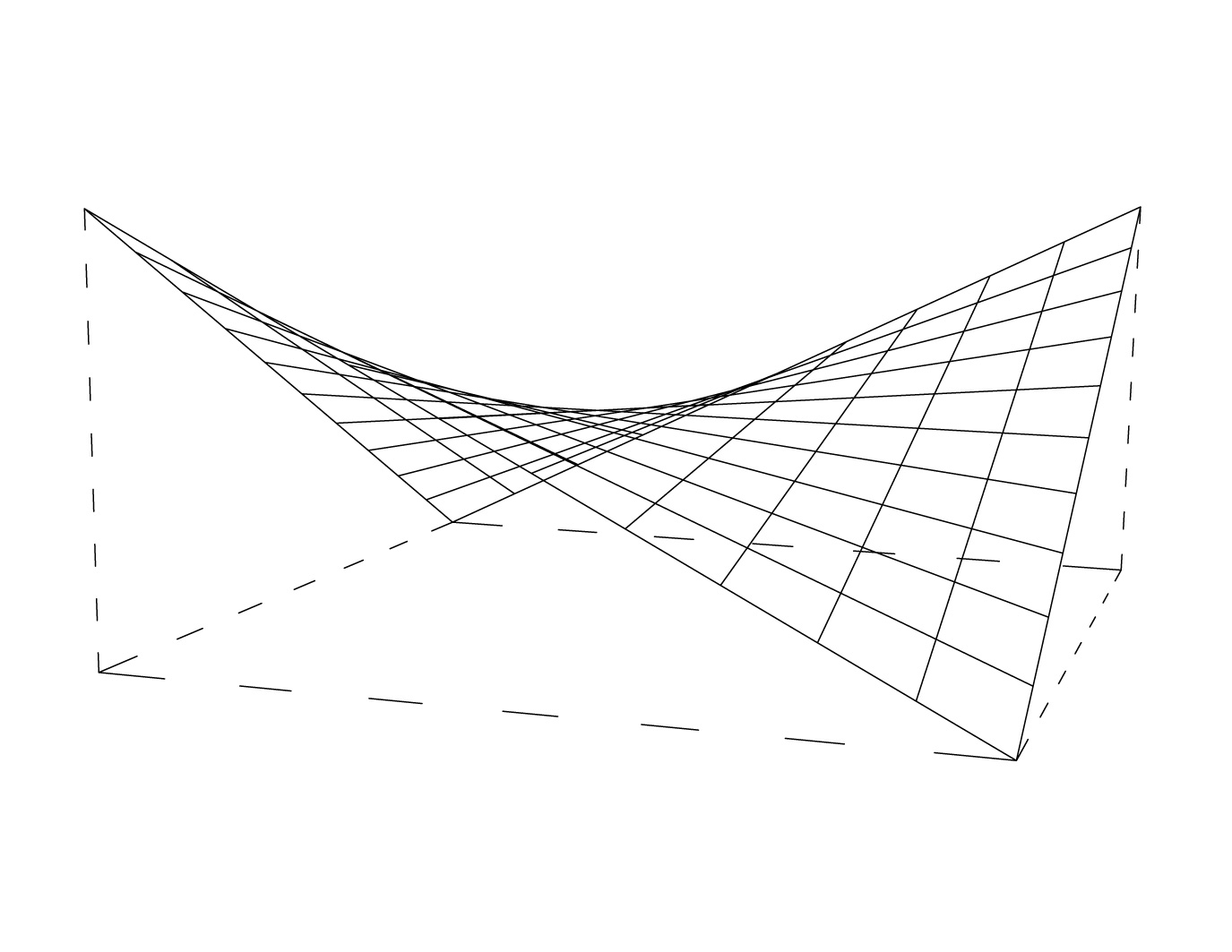
A saddle roof is a hyperbolic paraboloid, that mathematically, as a doubly ruled surface, can be constructed from two rows of straight beams.

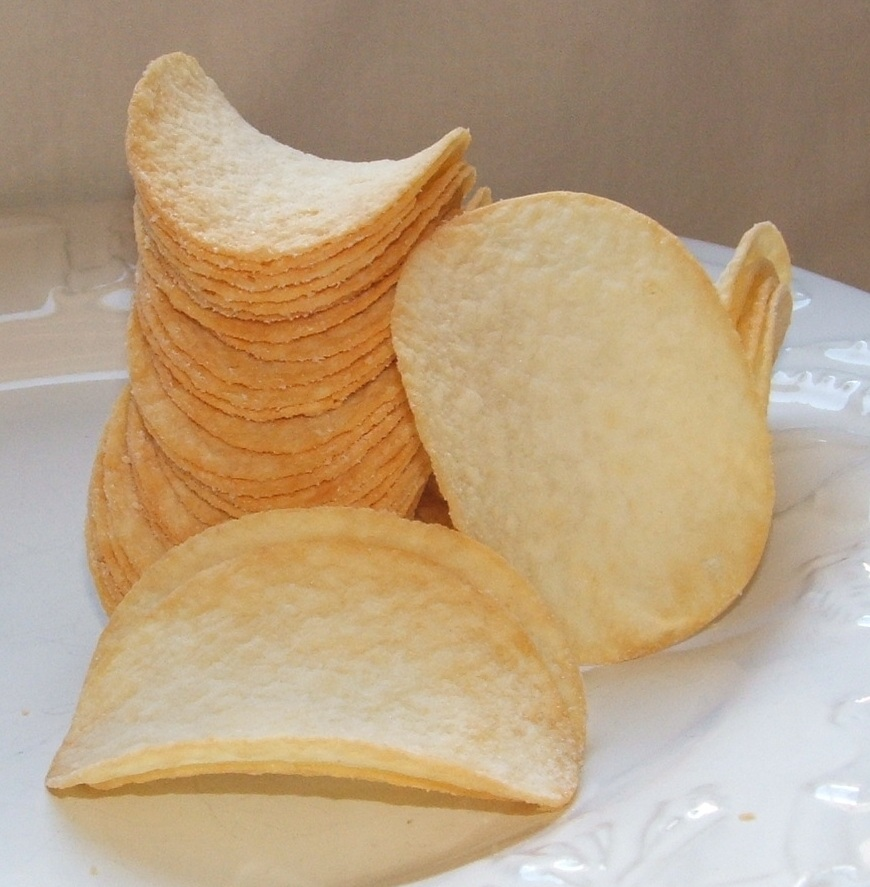
Pringles are examples of hyperbolic paraboloids.

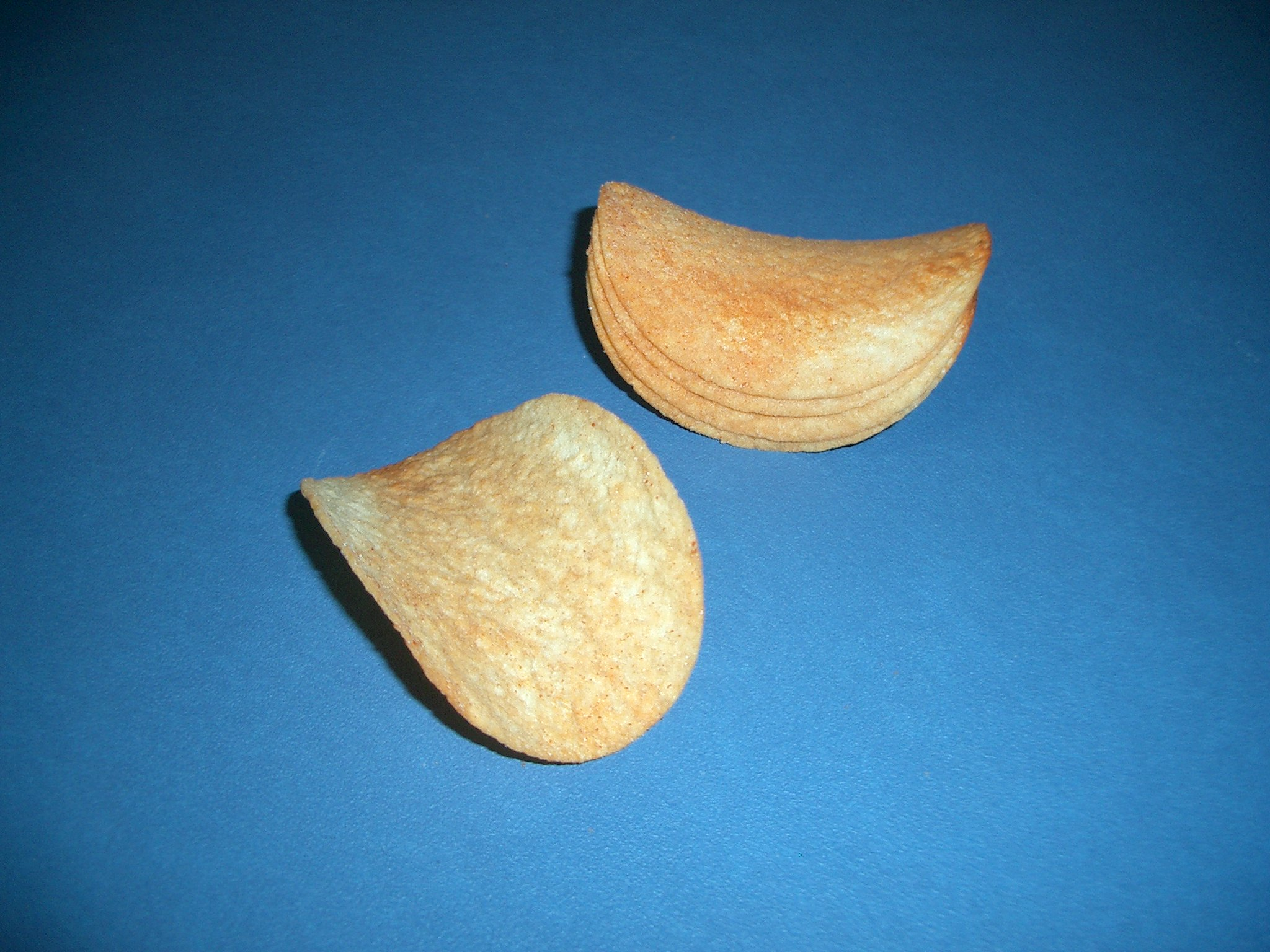
Stackable Pringles Chips.

== Gallery of more hyperboloid structures ==
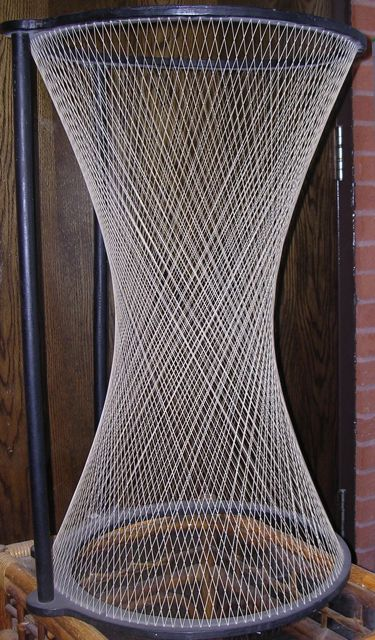
A hyperboloid of one sheet is a doubly ruled surface: it can be generated by either of two families of straight lines.

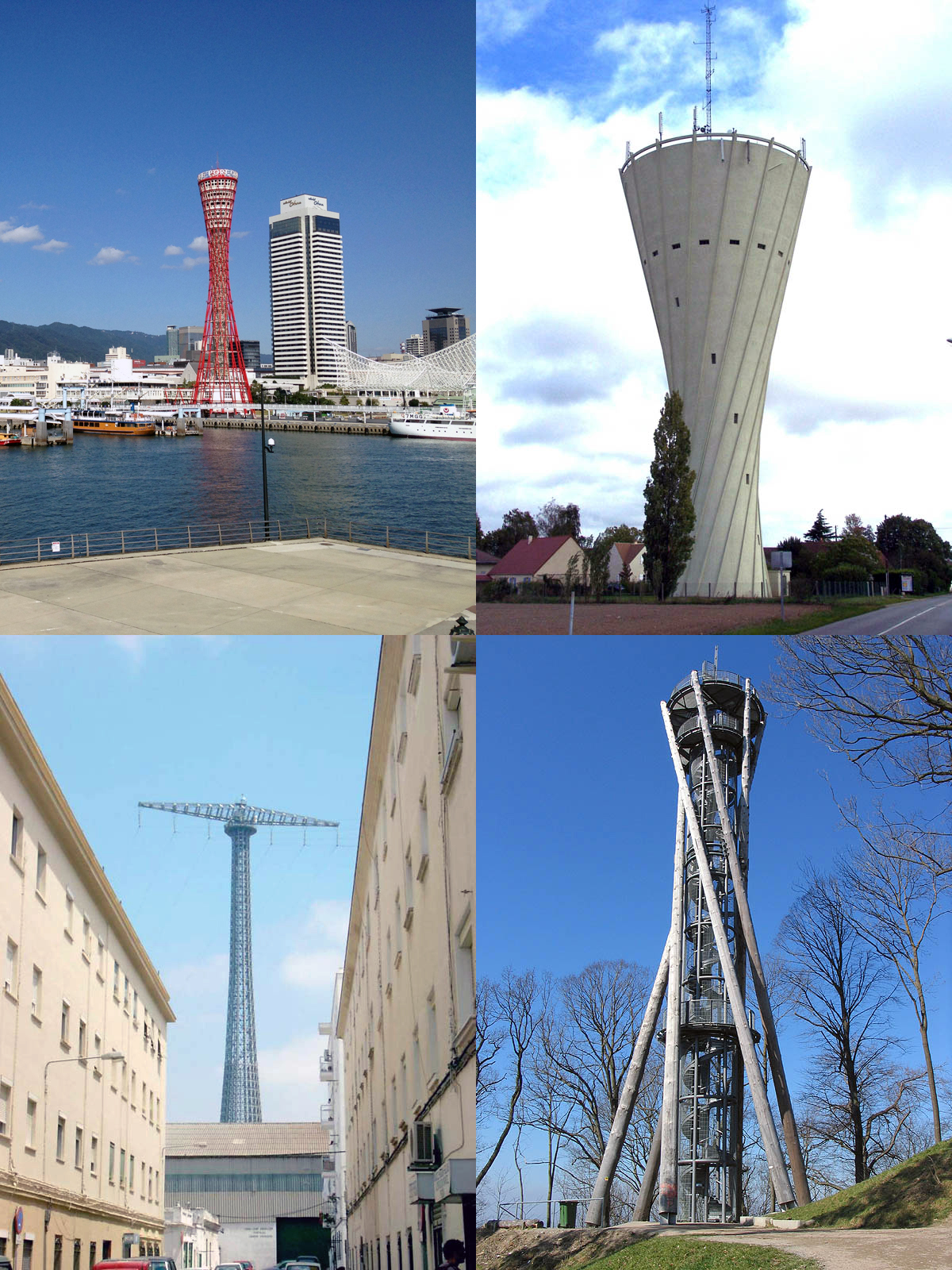
Four images of hyperboloid towers.

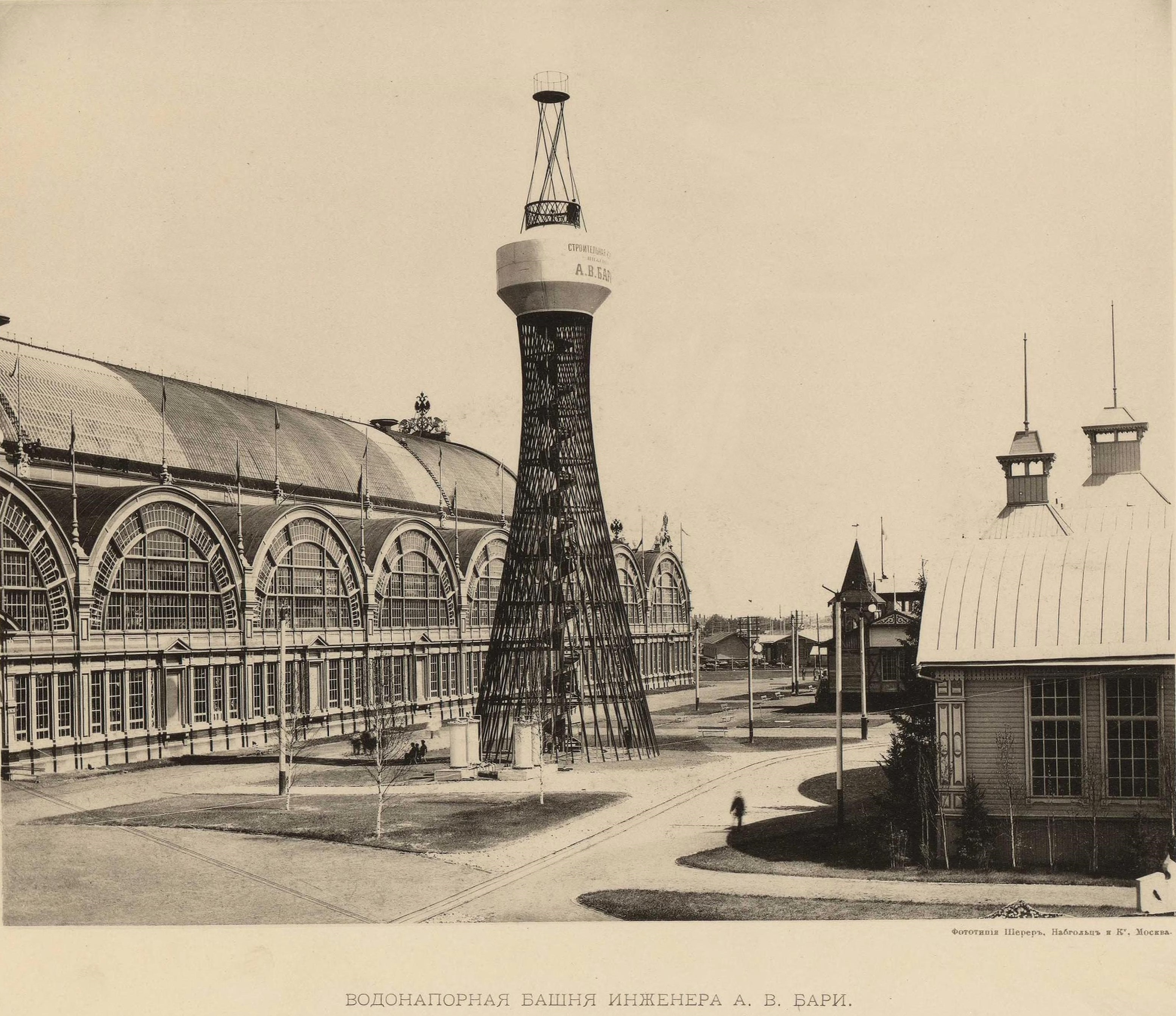
The Shukhov Tower in Polibino, the world's first hyperboloid structure, a water tower by Vladimir Shukhov at the All-Russian Exposition in Nizhny Novgorod, Russia

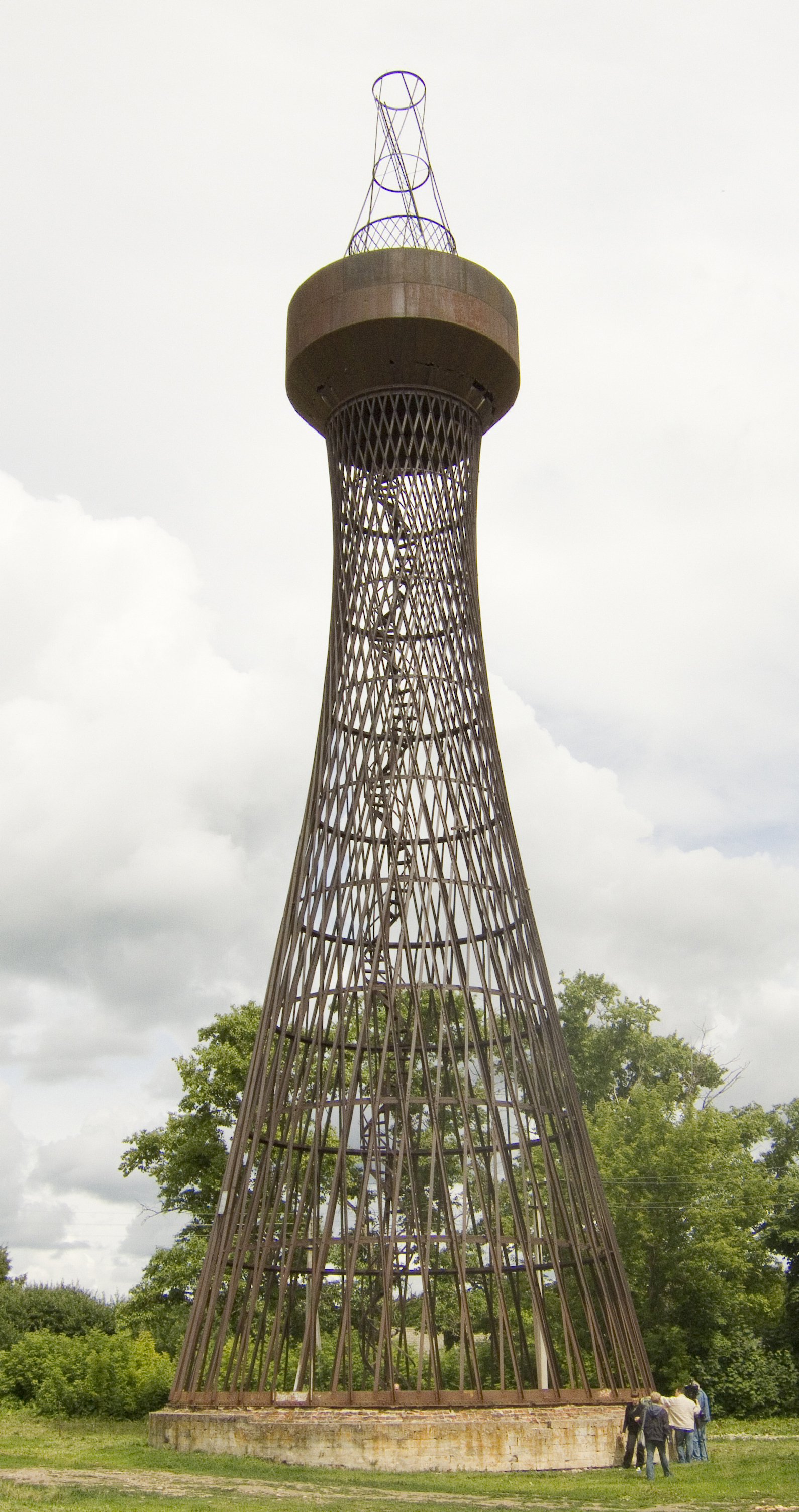
The Shukhov Tower in Polibino

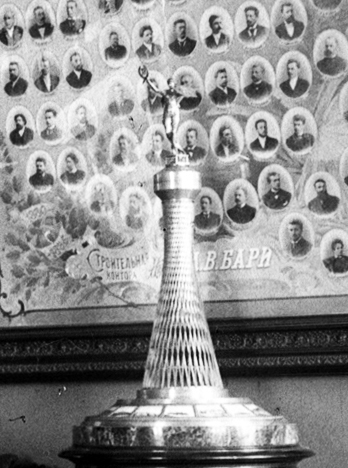
A Carl Faberge miniature silver model replica of Shukhov Tower, in 1896.

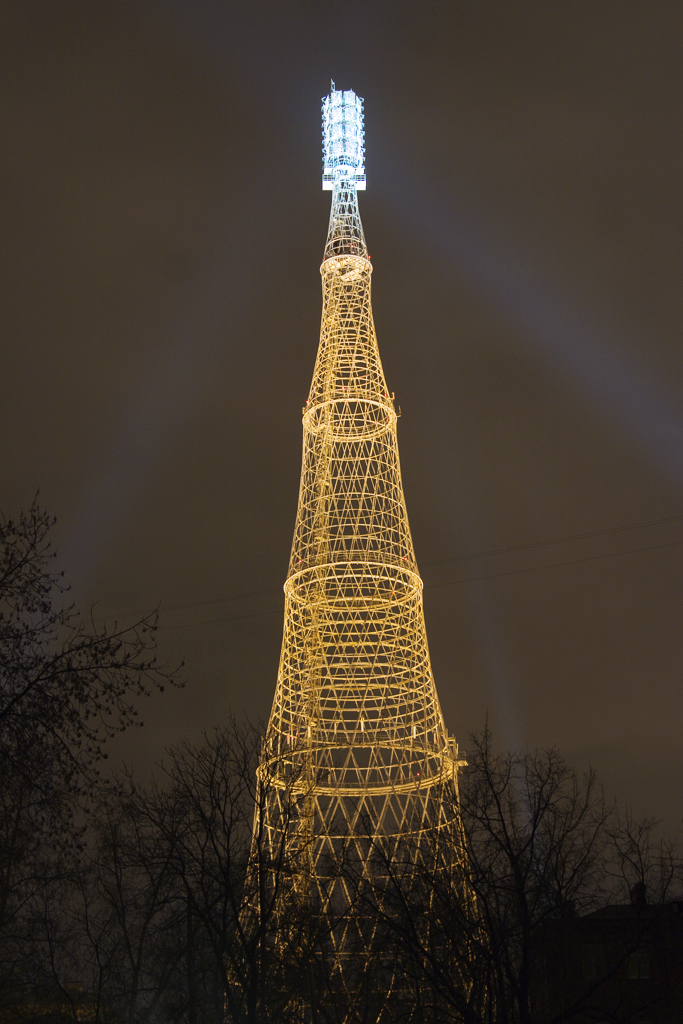
The Shukhov Tower in Moscow, Russia

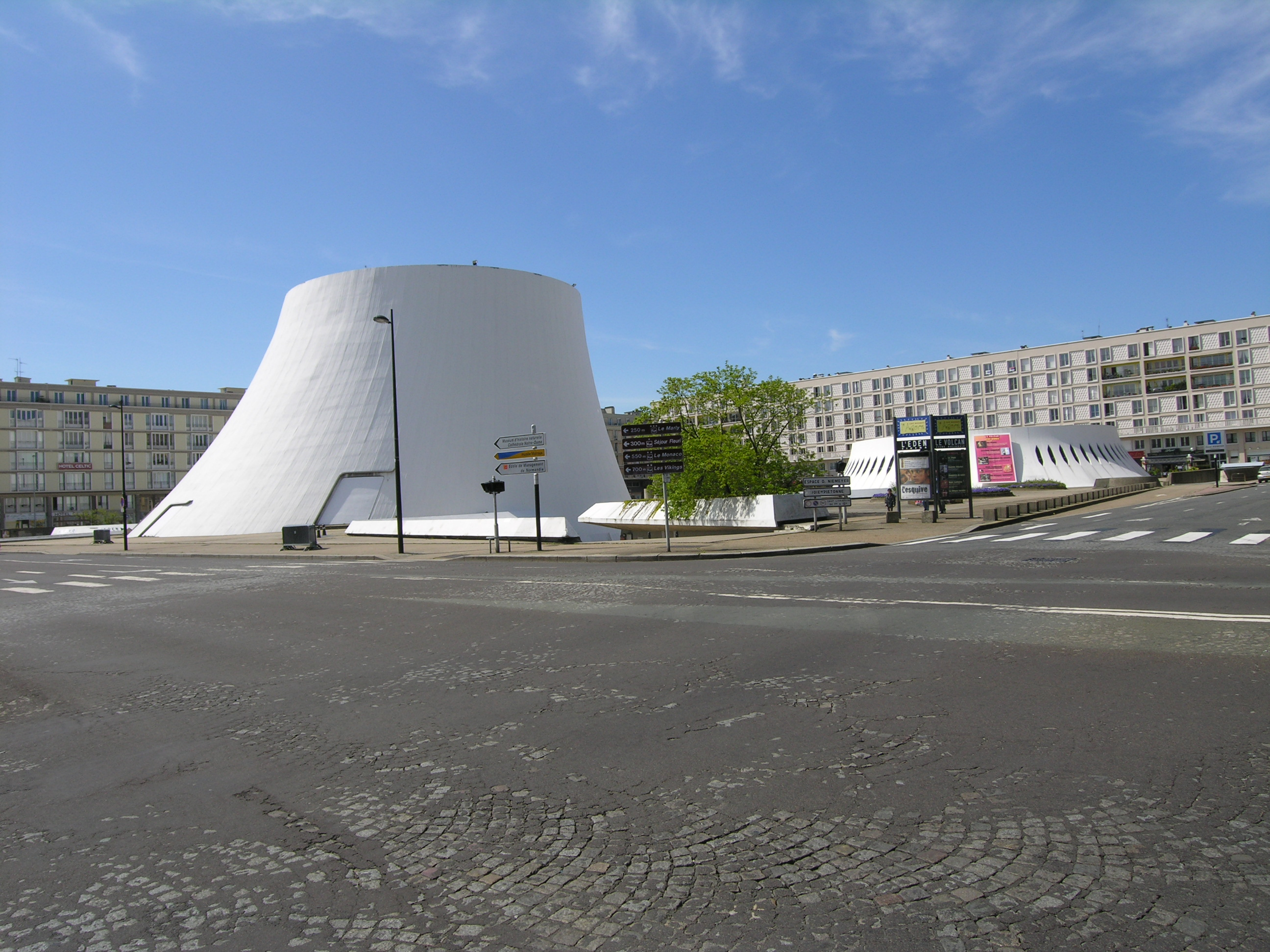
House of Culture, nicknamed "Le Volcan" by its Brazilian architect, Oscar Niemeyer, Le Havre, France, 1982

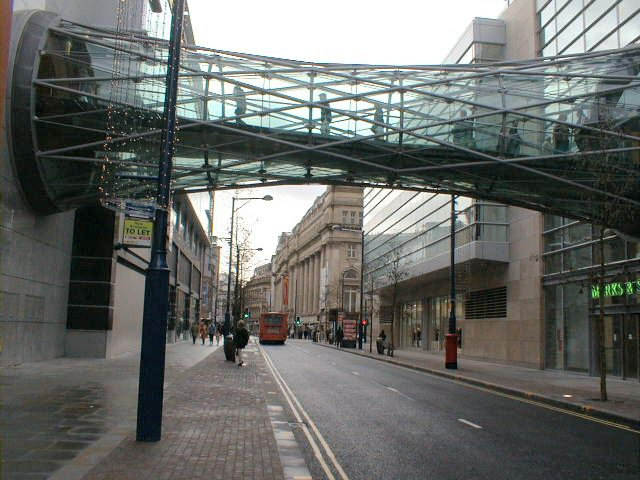
The Corporation Street Bridge in Manchester, England

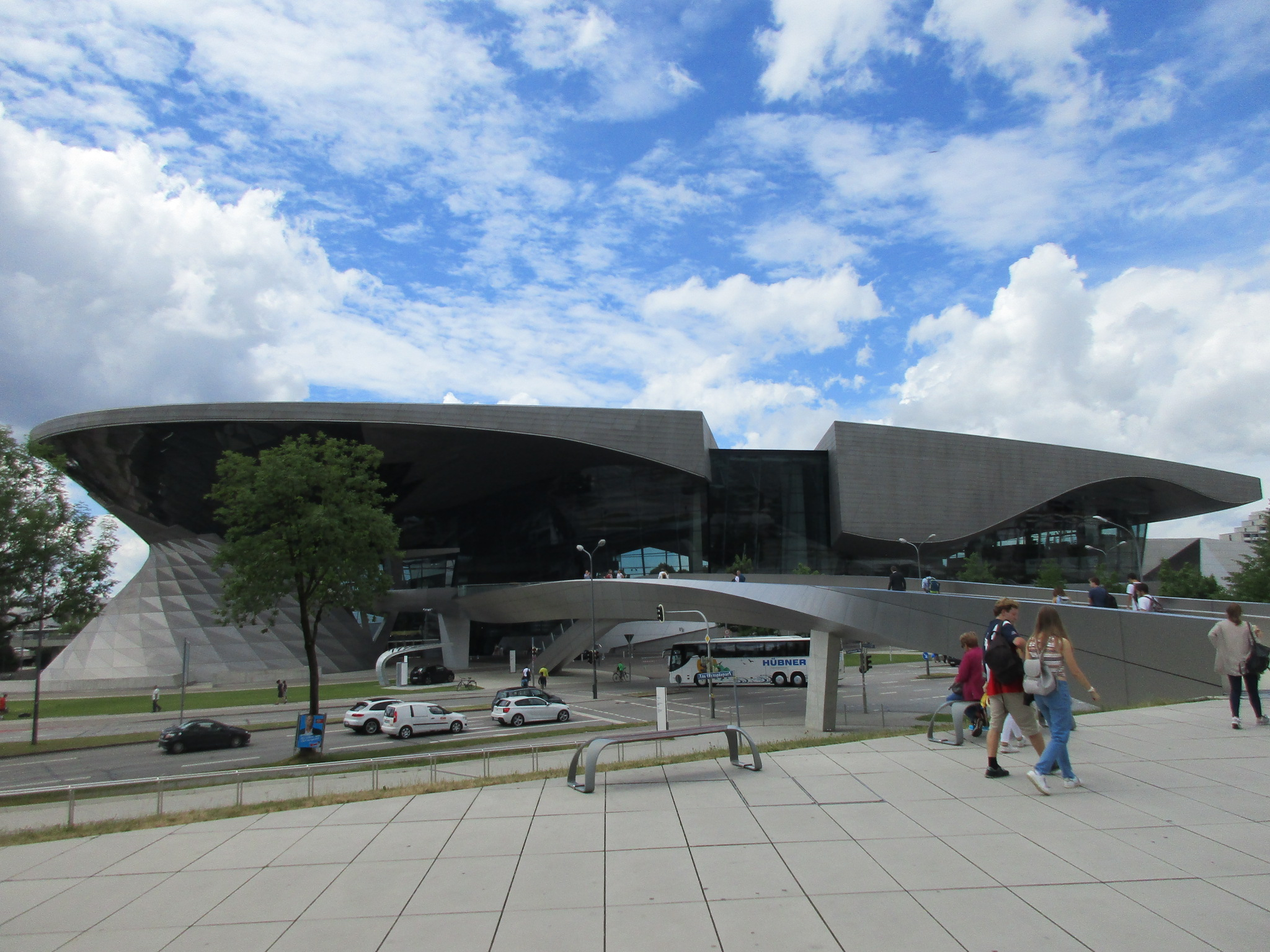
BMW Welt, a museum and event venue at the Olympic Park, Munich, Germany, designed by Wolf D. Prix and architect firm Coop Himmelb(l)au

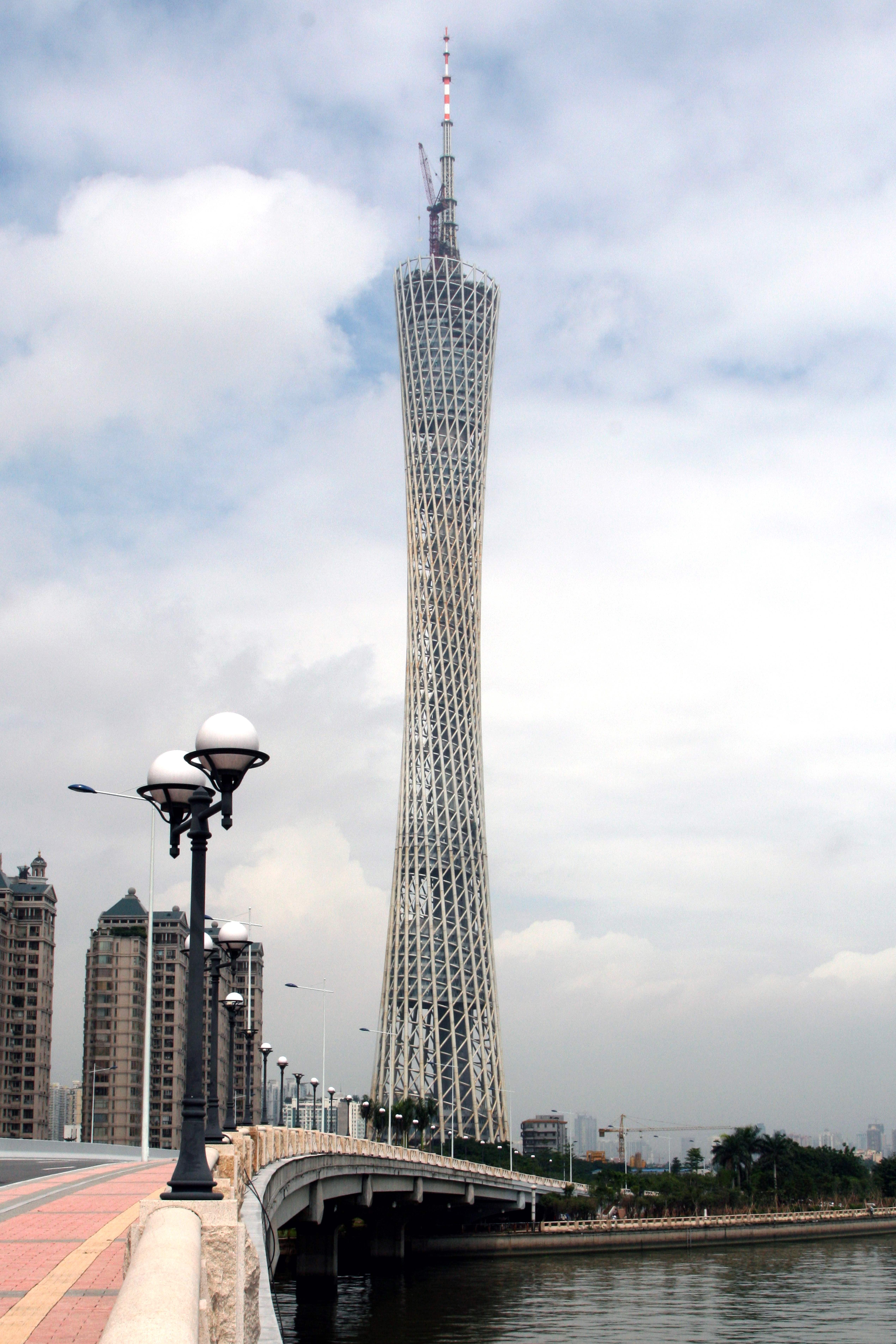
The Canton Tower in Guangzhou, China

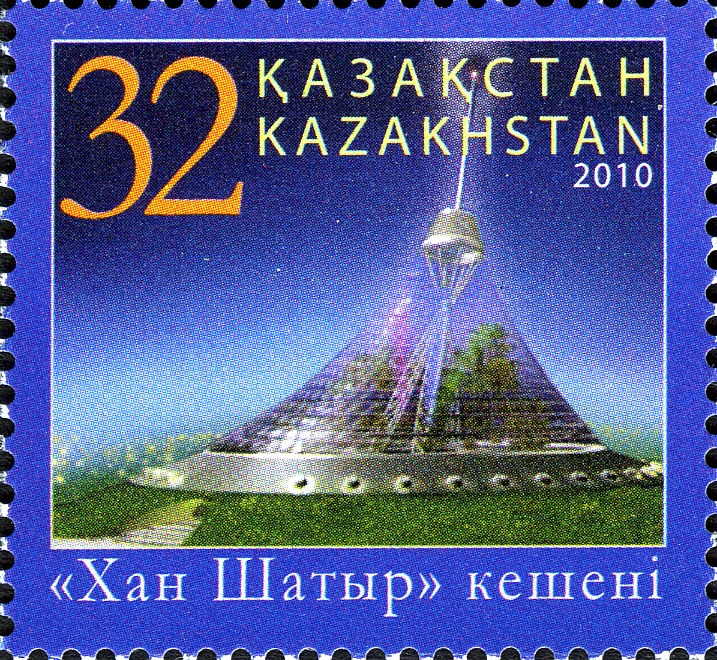
The Khan Shatyr Entertainment Center, a daytime computer render on a postage stamp.

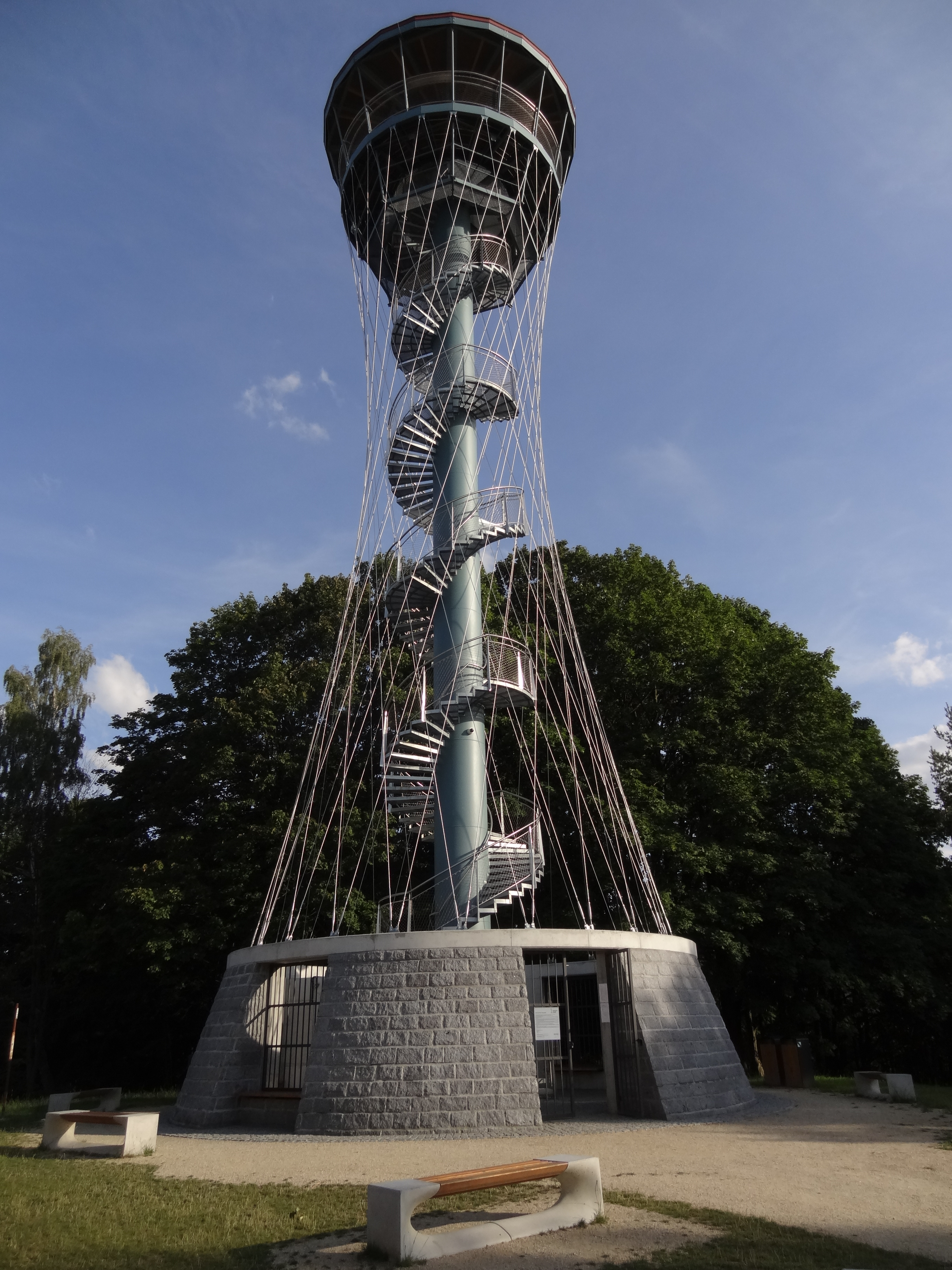
The Vysoká Tower in Tachov, Czech Republic

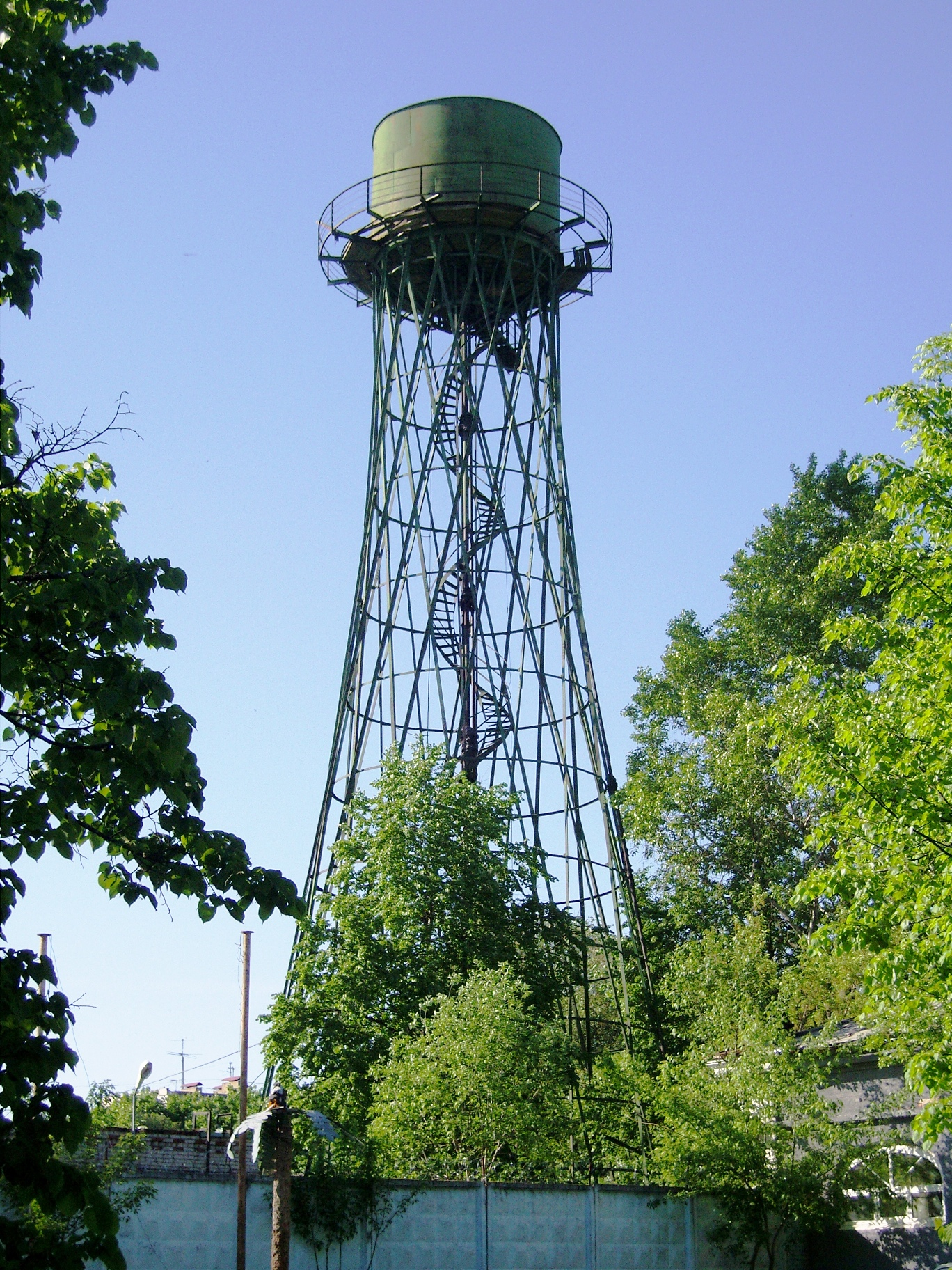
Shukhov's hyperpoloid water tower in Lobnya-Lugovaya near Moscow

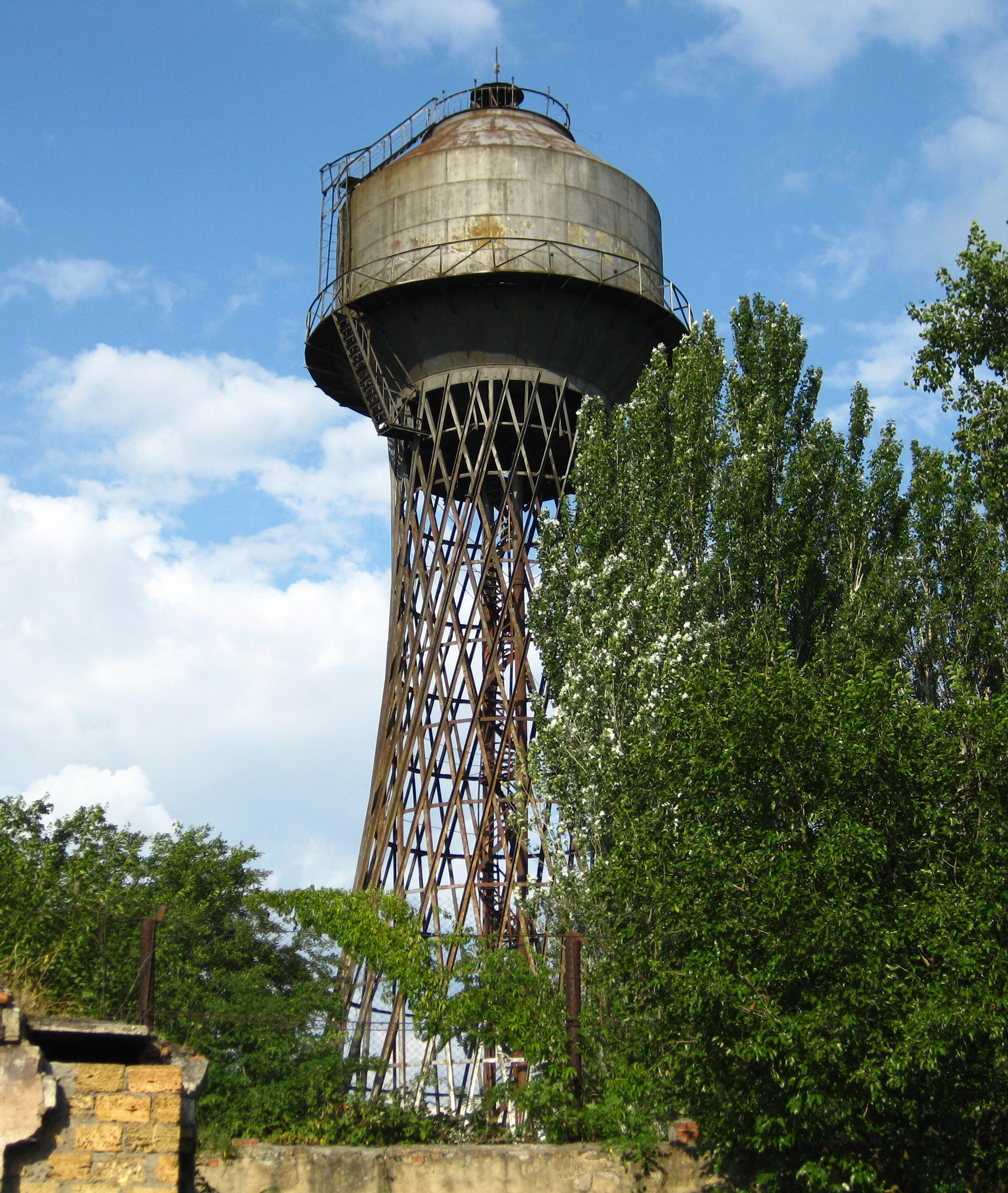
Shukhov water tower in Mykolaiv, Ukraine

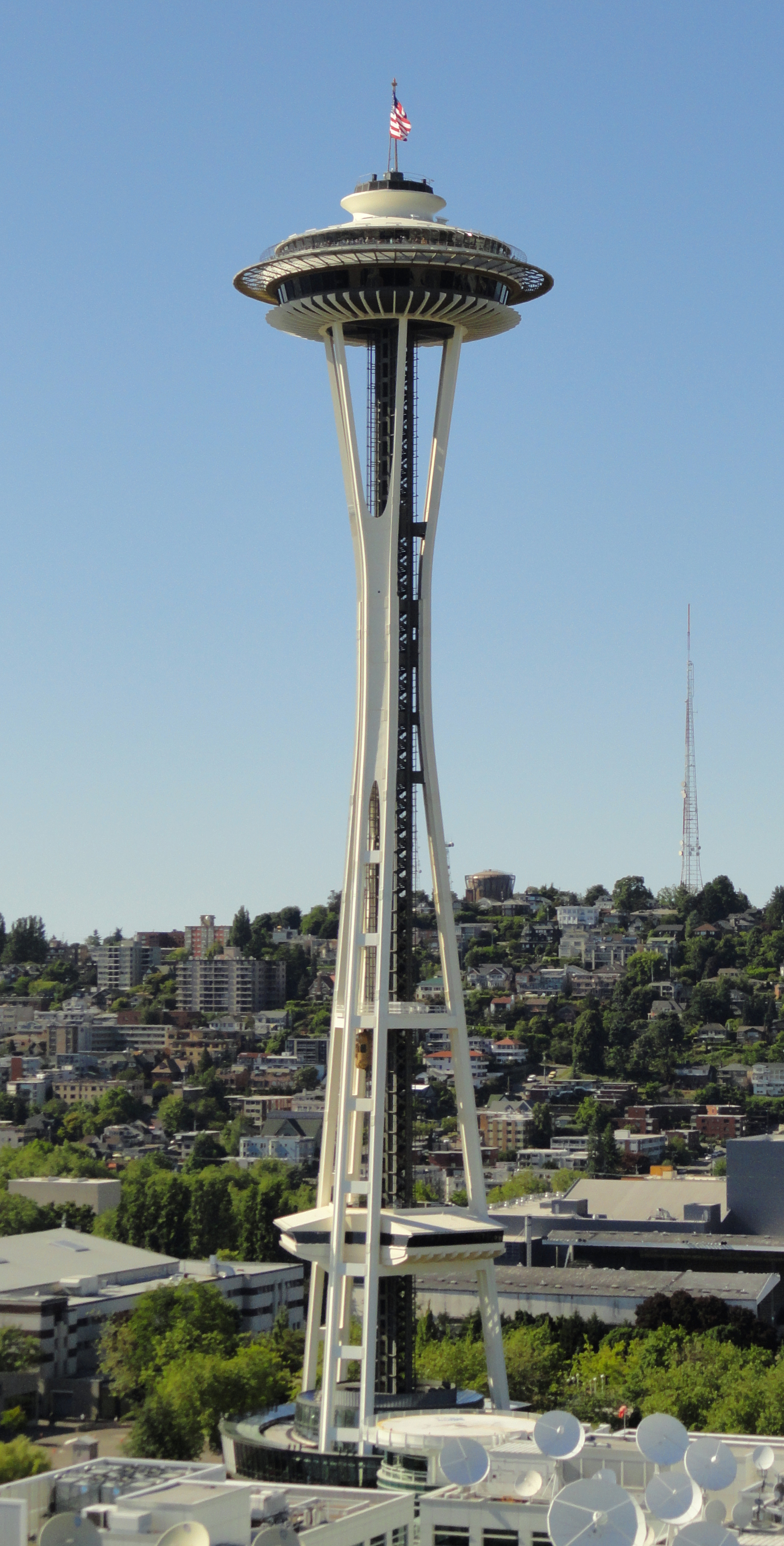
Space Needle, Seattle, United States

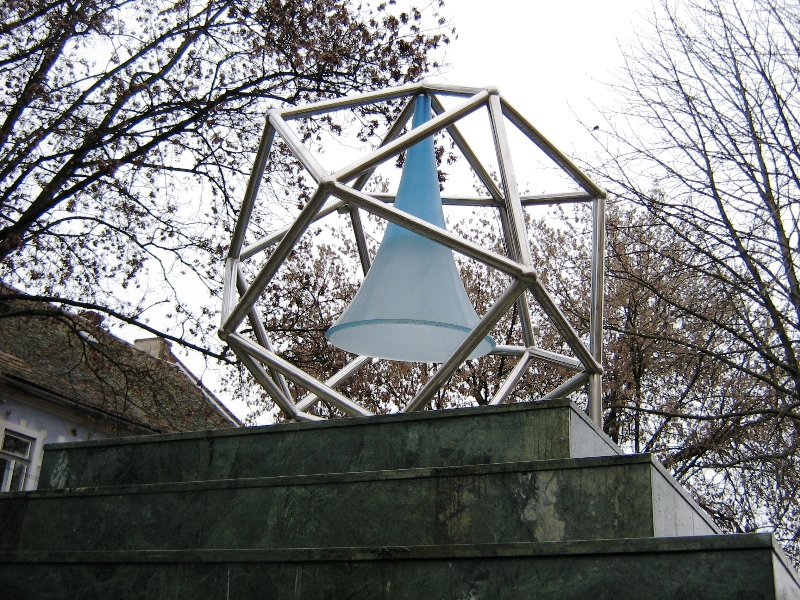
Pseudosphaera statue in Târgu Mureş

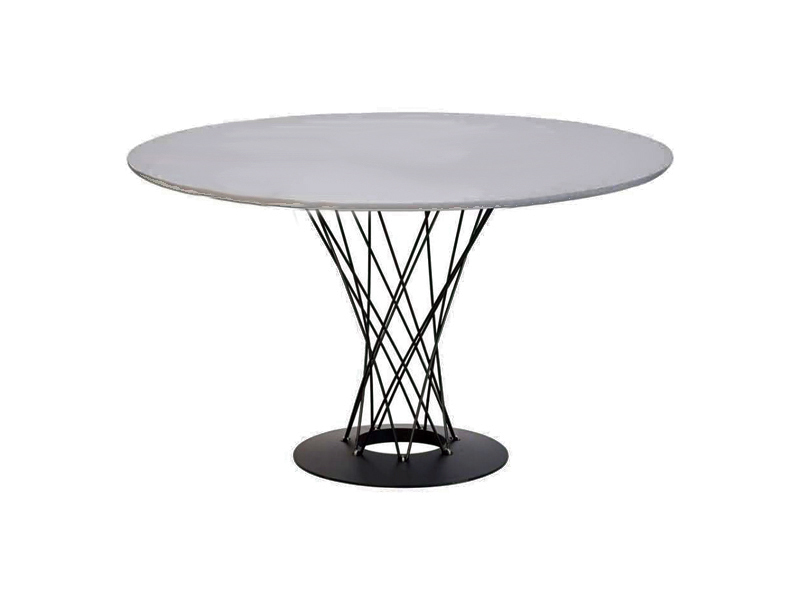
Our Zuo table

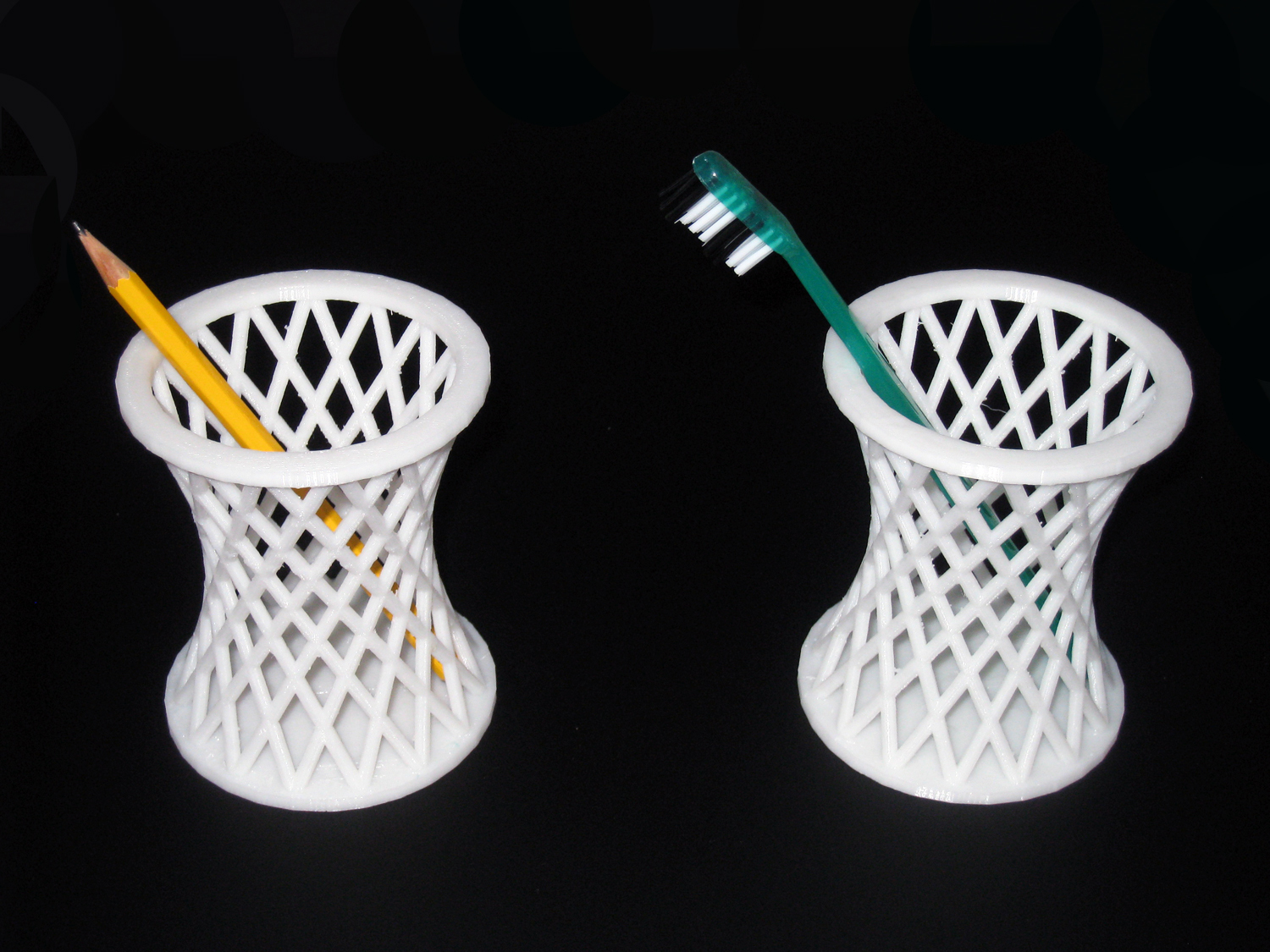
3D-printed dual-use pen/toothbrush holder-cup. Printed on Ultimaker 2

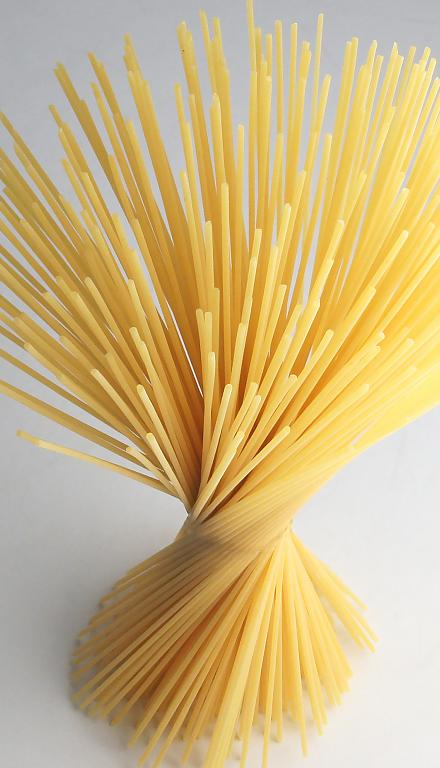
Spaghetti spiral

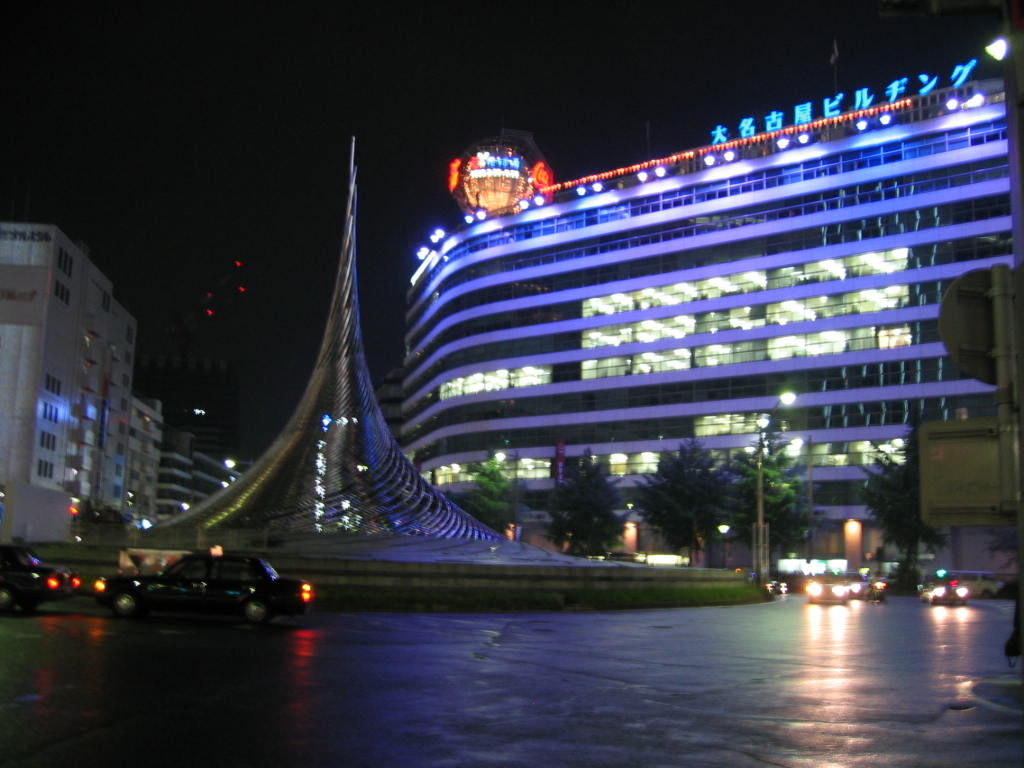
Hyperboloid metallic monument near Nagoya Station in Japan

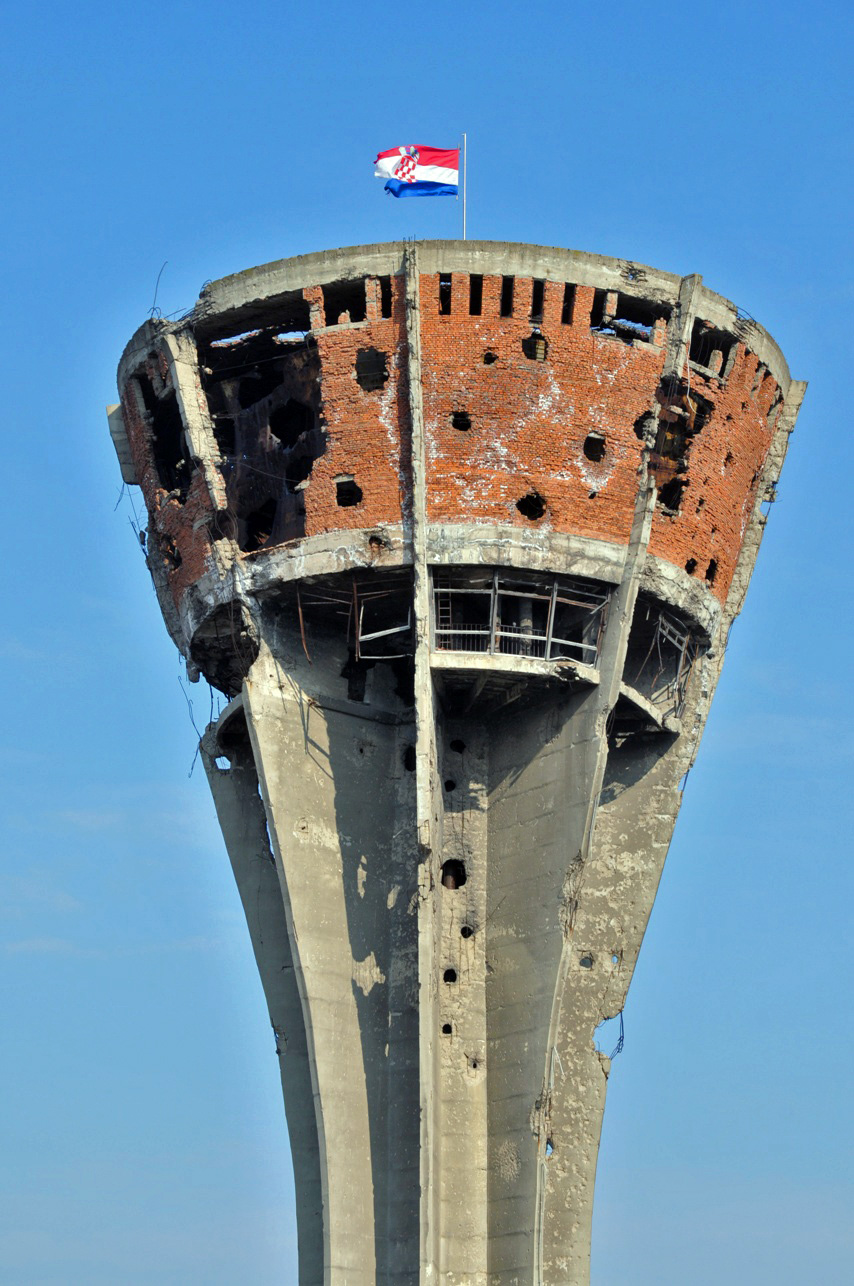
Vukovar water tower, Croatia

== Gallery of hyperboloid ship masts ==
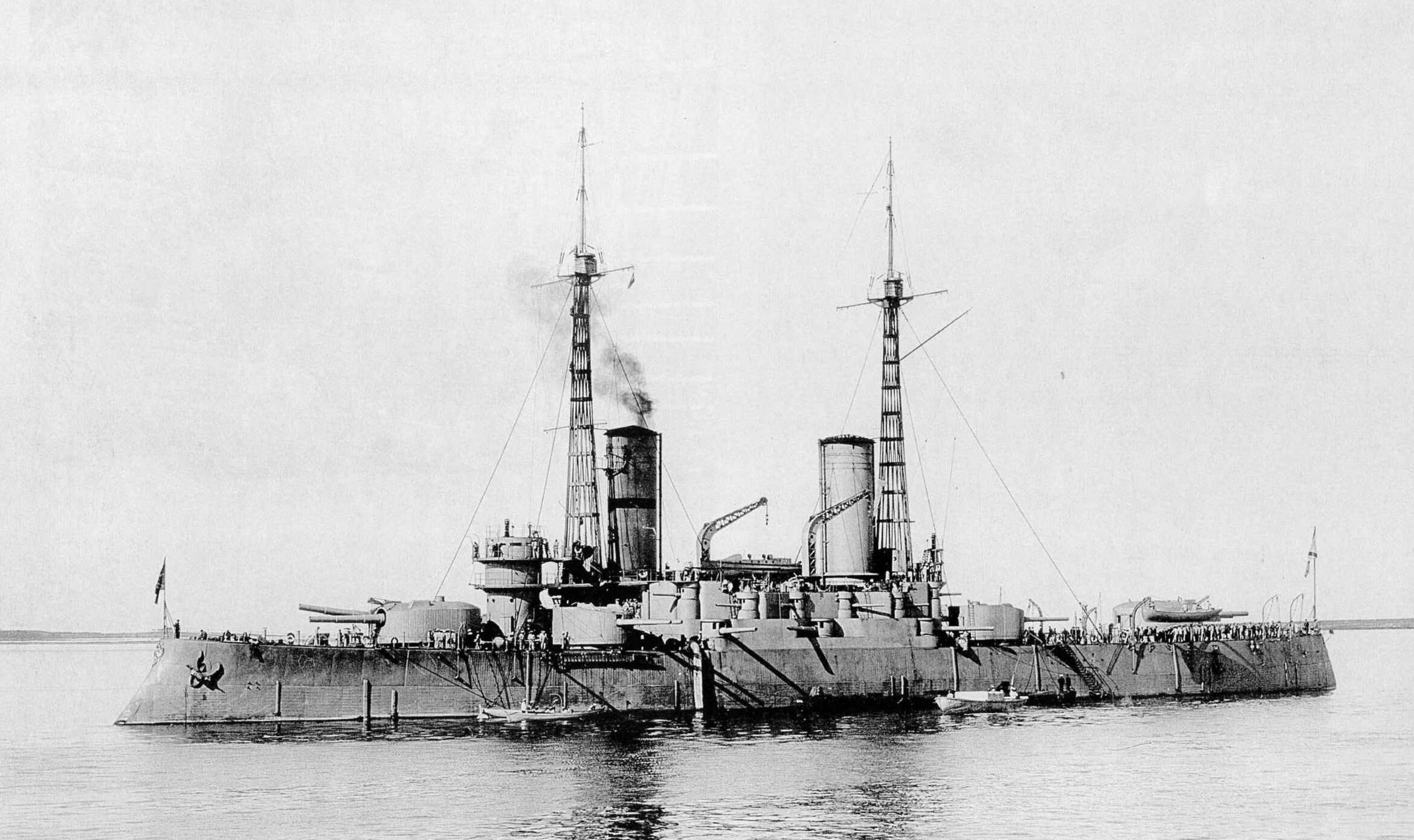
Hyperboloid mast towers were on Russian Andrei Pervozvanny-class battleships, like the "Imperator Pavel" (Emperor Paul I), early June 1912.

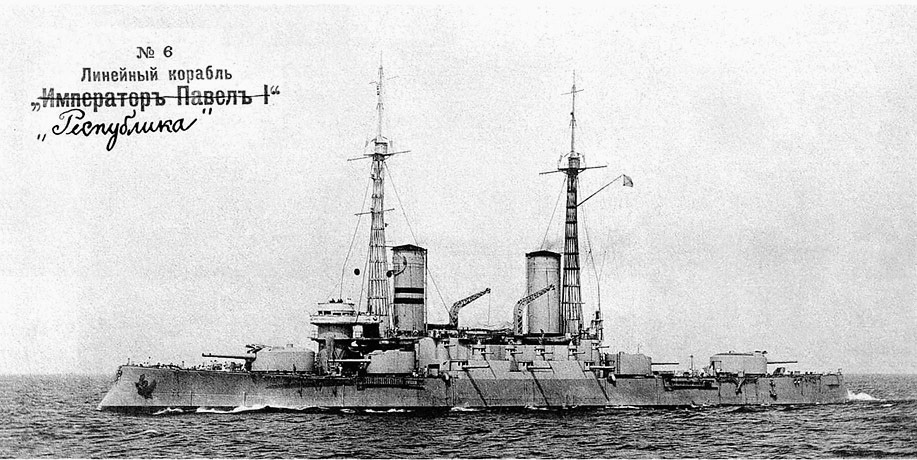
Hyperboloid mast towers were on Andrei Pervozvanny-class battleships, like the Imperator Pavel I, underway, on this postcard circa 1917.

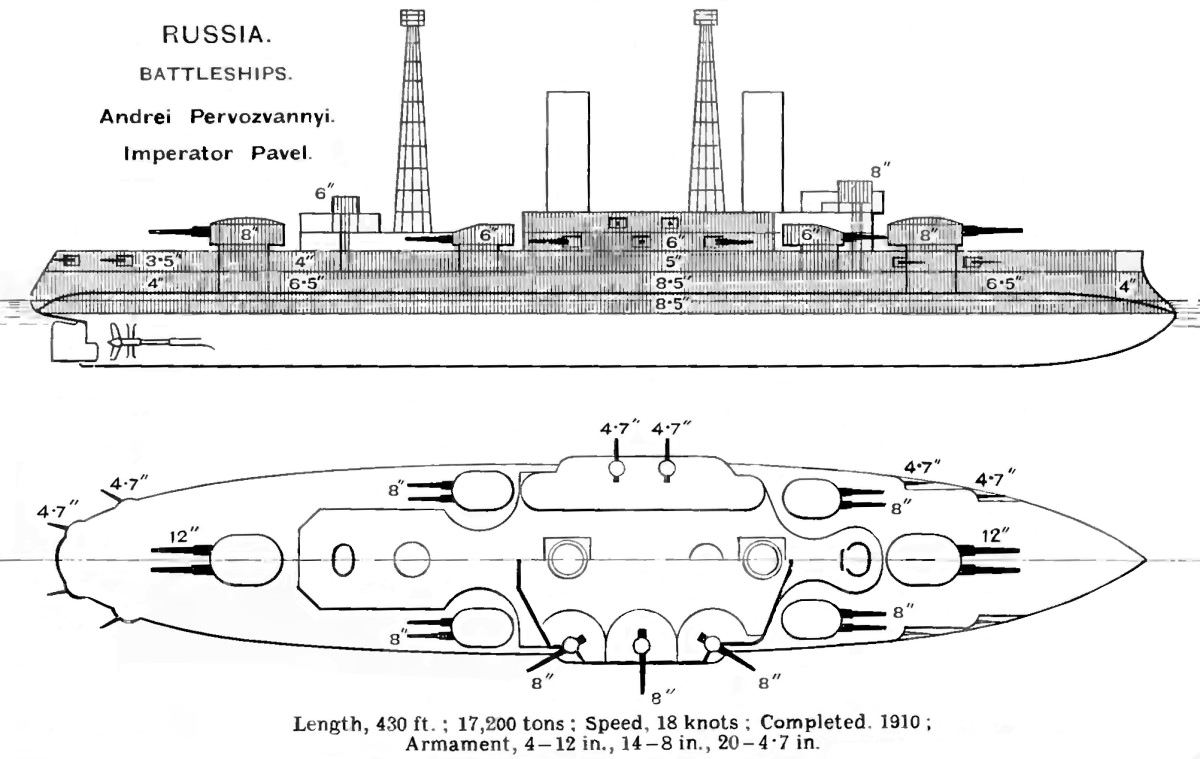
Hyperboloid mast towers were on Andrei Pervozvanny-class battleships, illustrated plans from Brassey's Naval Annual 1912.

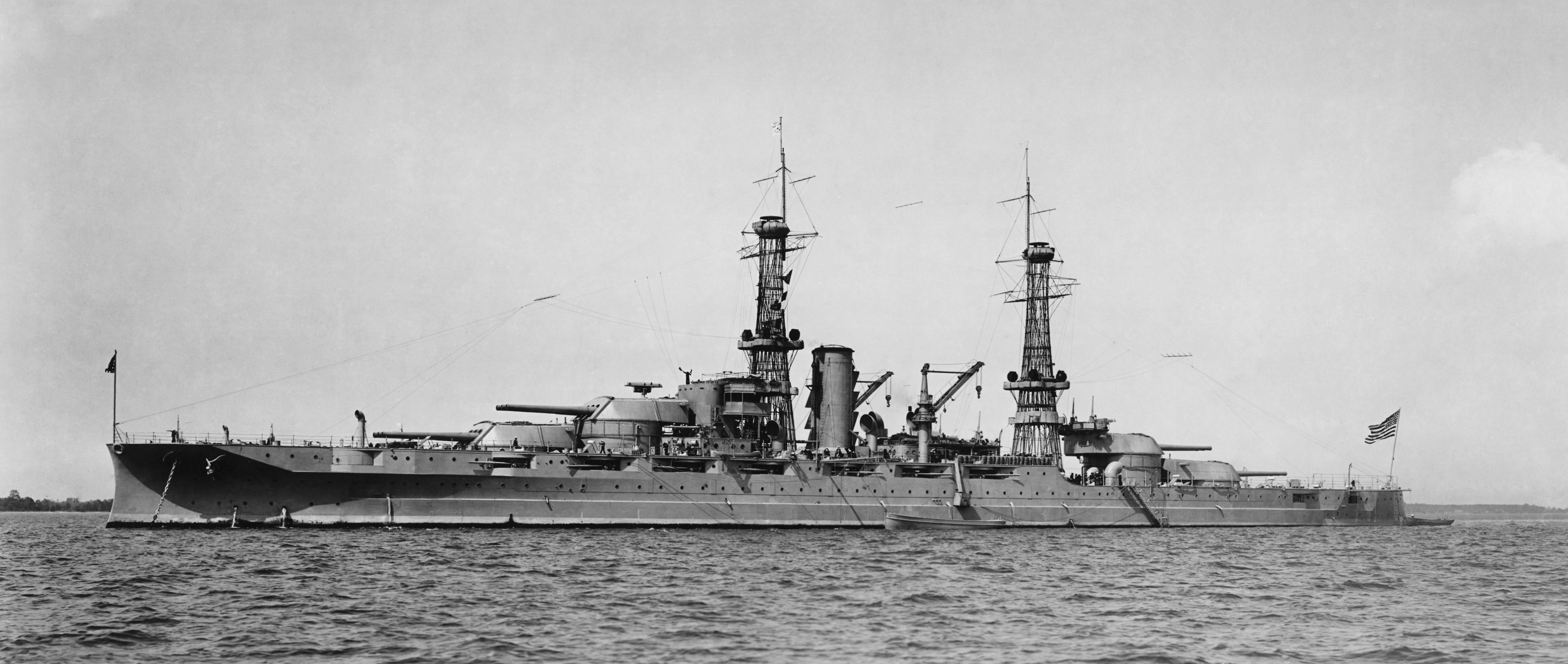
Hyperboloid mast towers were on the USS Arizona, underway circa 1917–1929, prior to refitting in 1929.

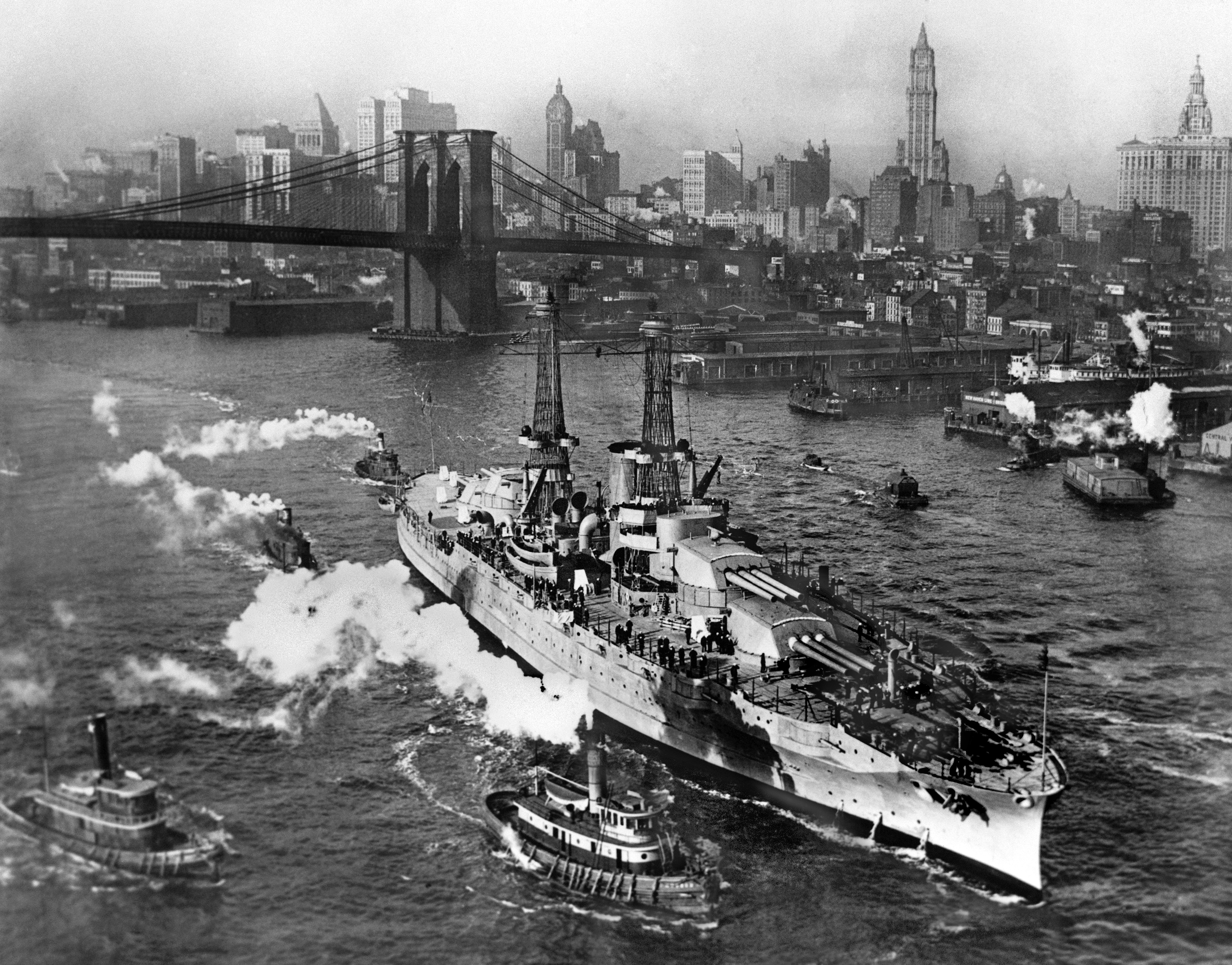
Hyperboloid mast towers were on the USS Arizona, a view from the Manhattan Bridge on the East River, in New York City, December 25, 1916.

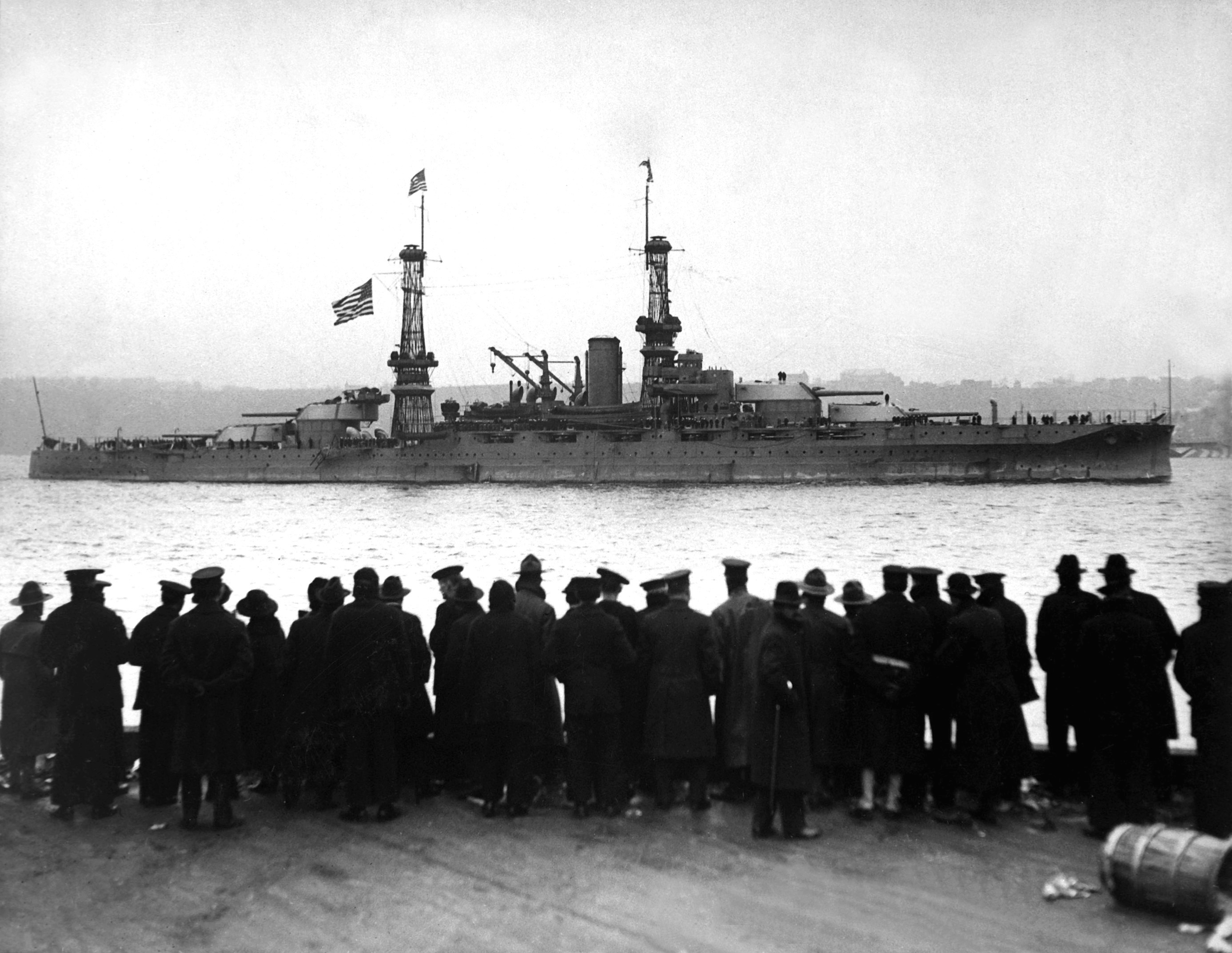
Hyperboloid mast towers were on the USS Arizona, passing the 96th St. Pier in New York City, circa December 26, 1918.

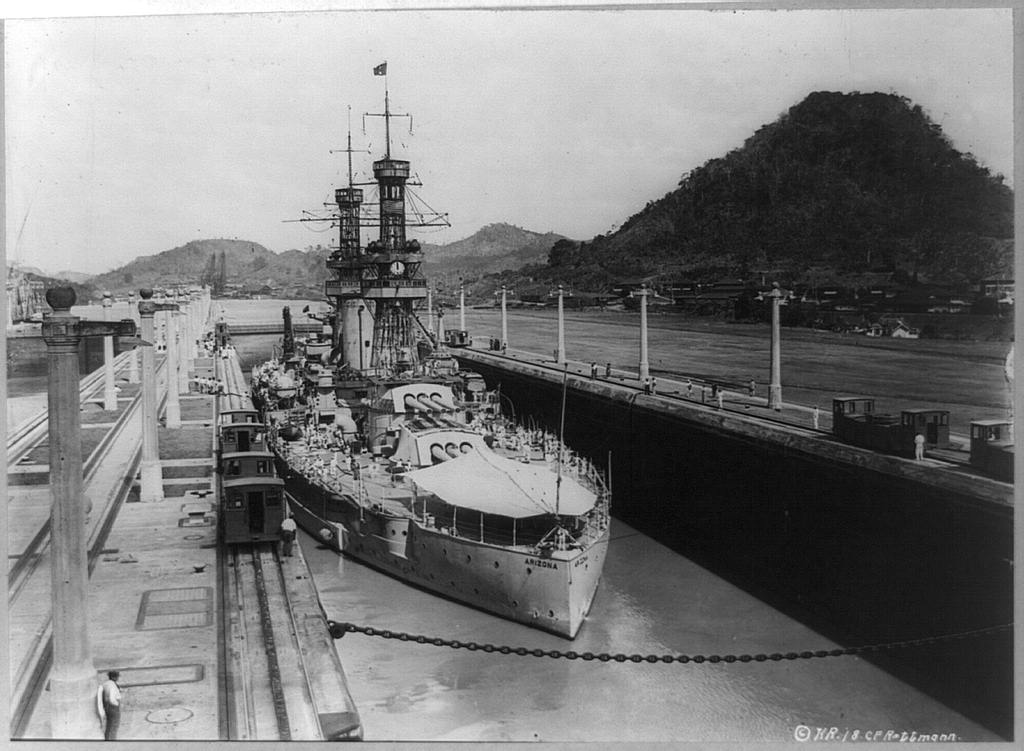
Hyperboloid mast towers were on the USS Arizona, in lock, Panama, 1921.

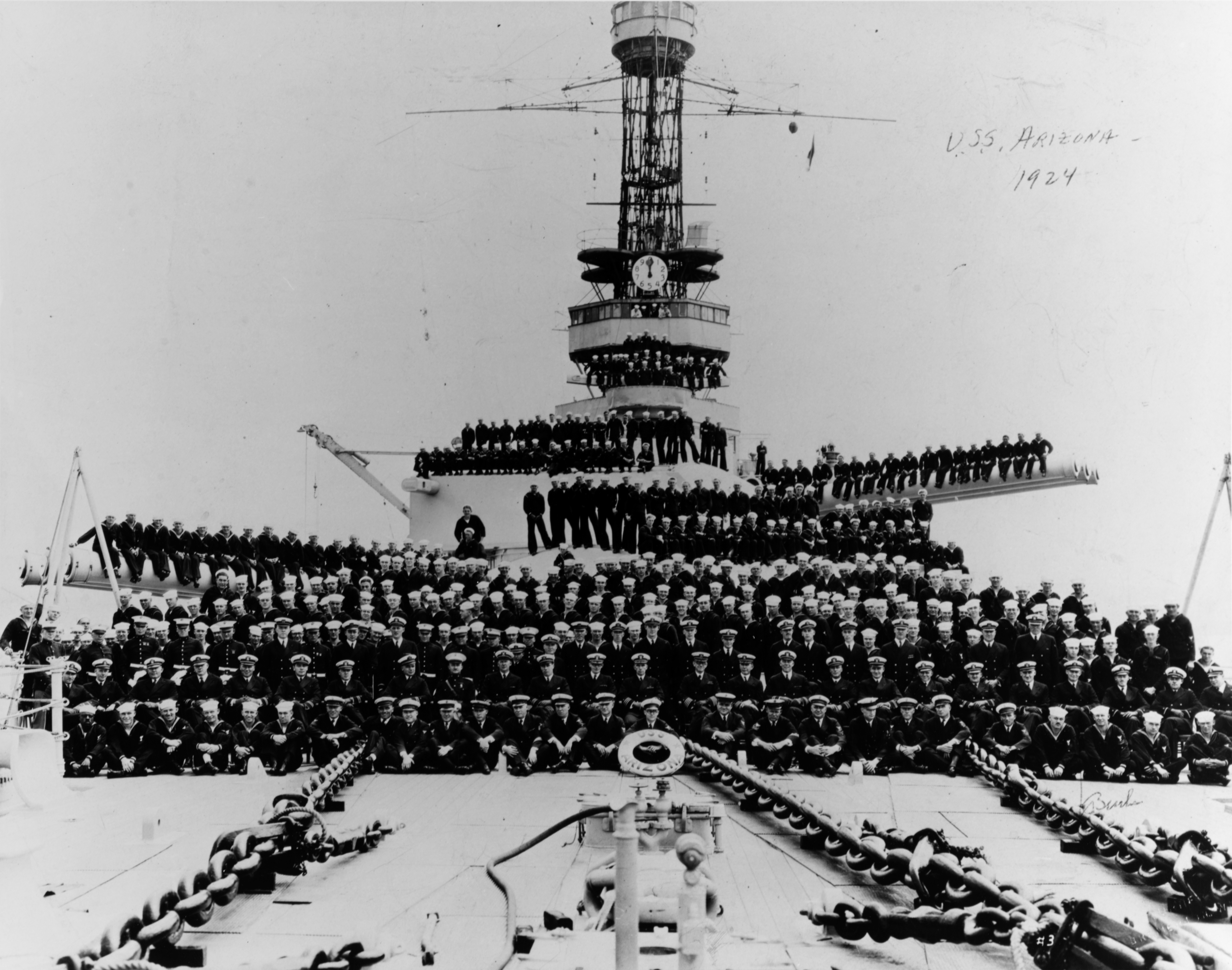
Hyperboloid mast towers were on the USS Arizona, with the ship's complement posing on her forecastle, forward turrets and superstructure, circa 1924.

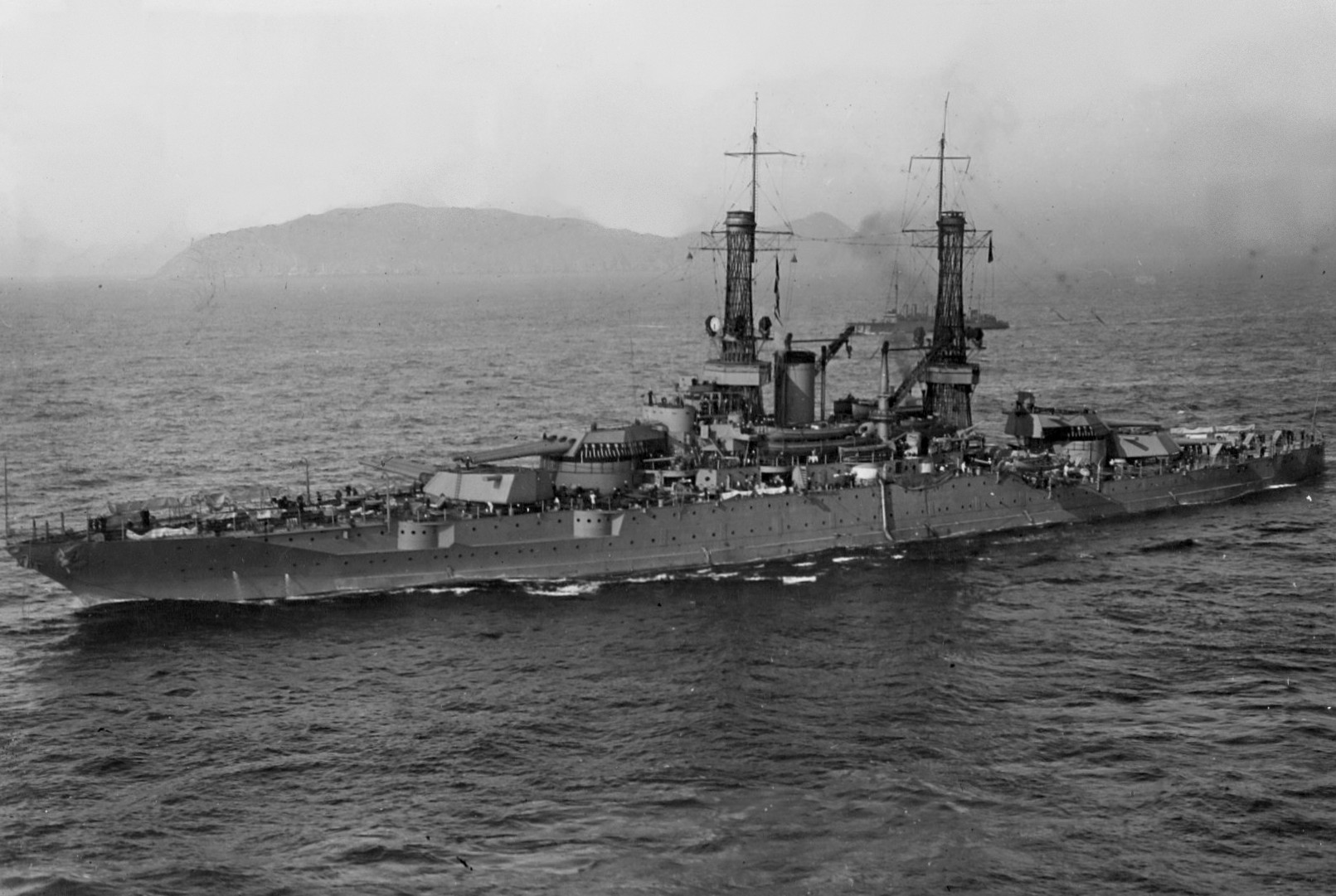
Hyperboloid mast towers were on the USS New Mexico, in 1921, prior to refitting in 1931.

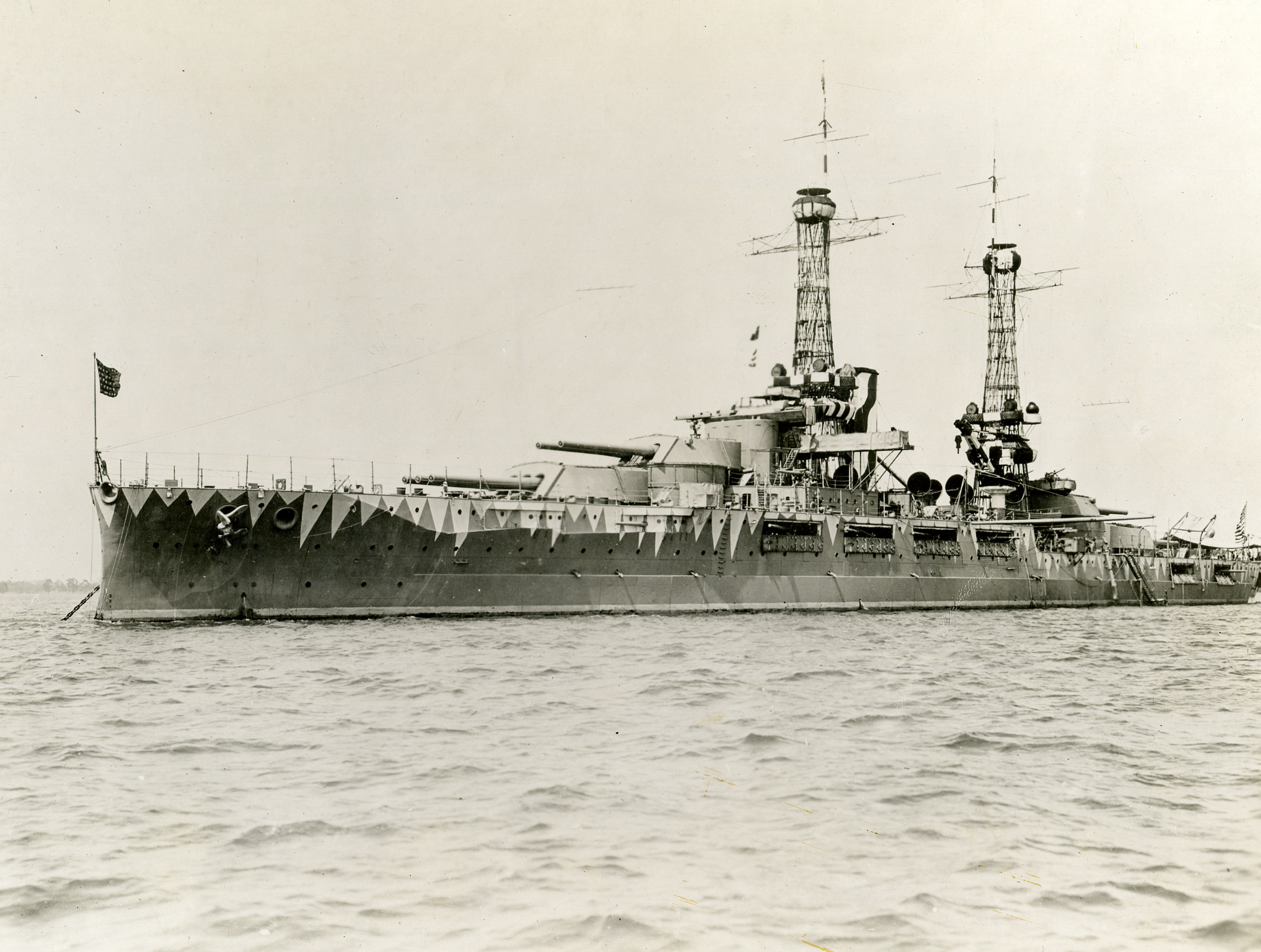
Hyperboloid mast towers were on the USS Oklahoma, at anchor wearing experimental camouflage, circa 1917, prior to refitting in 1927–1929.

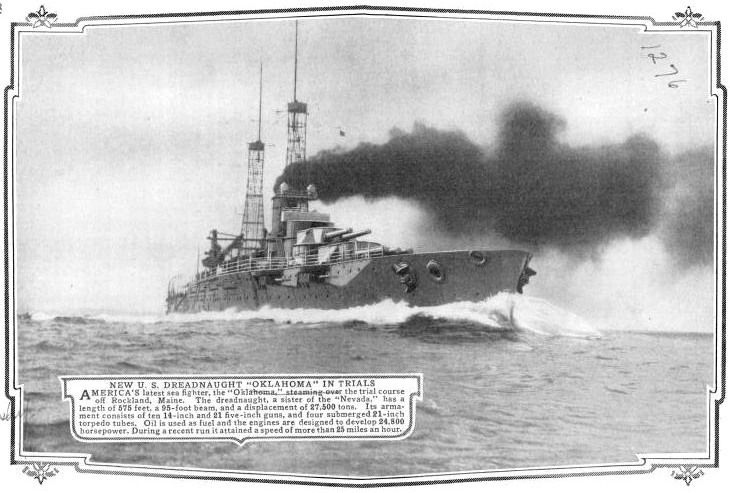
Hyperboloid mast towers were on the USS Oklahoma, under way during her sea trials, in "Popular Mechanics" Magazine, March 1916.

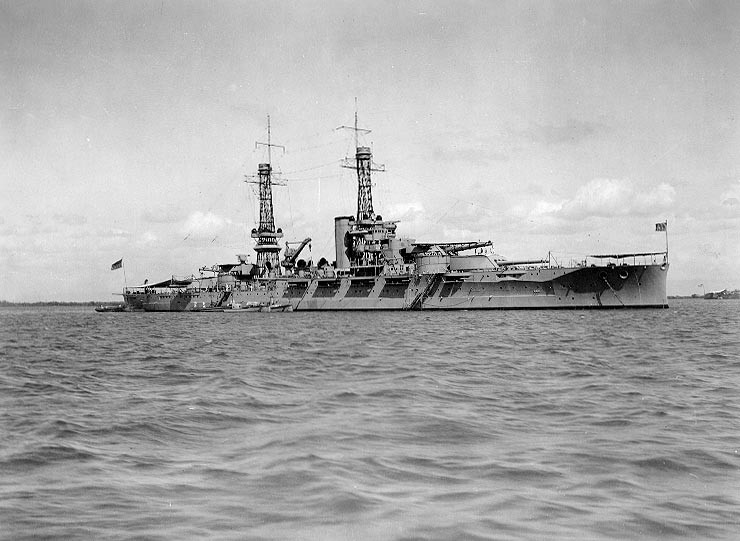
Hyperboloid towers of USS Oklahoma, 1920.

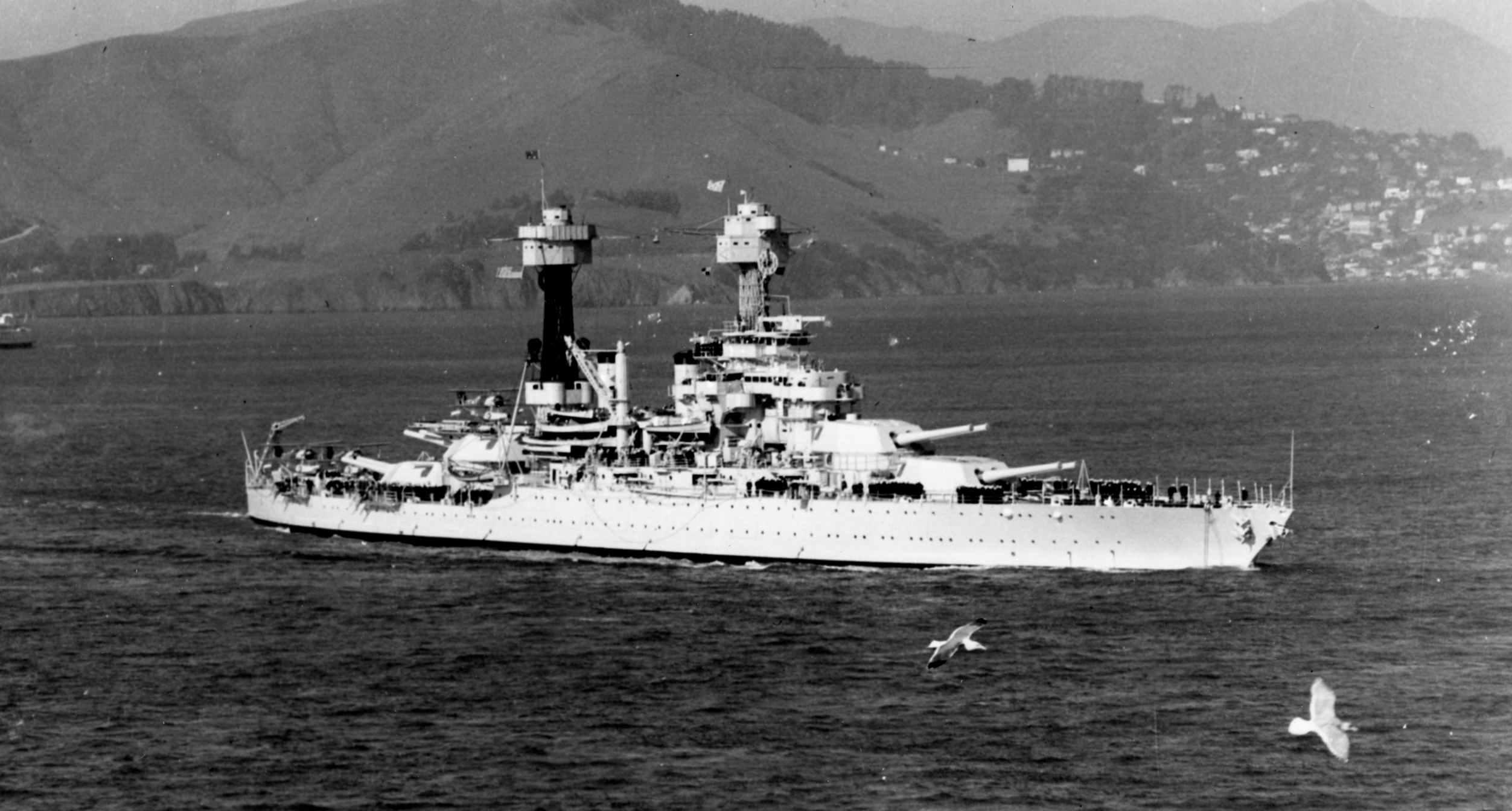
Hyperboloid mast towers were on the USS West Virginia, in San Francisco Bay circa 1934, prior to refitting in 1942–1944.

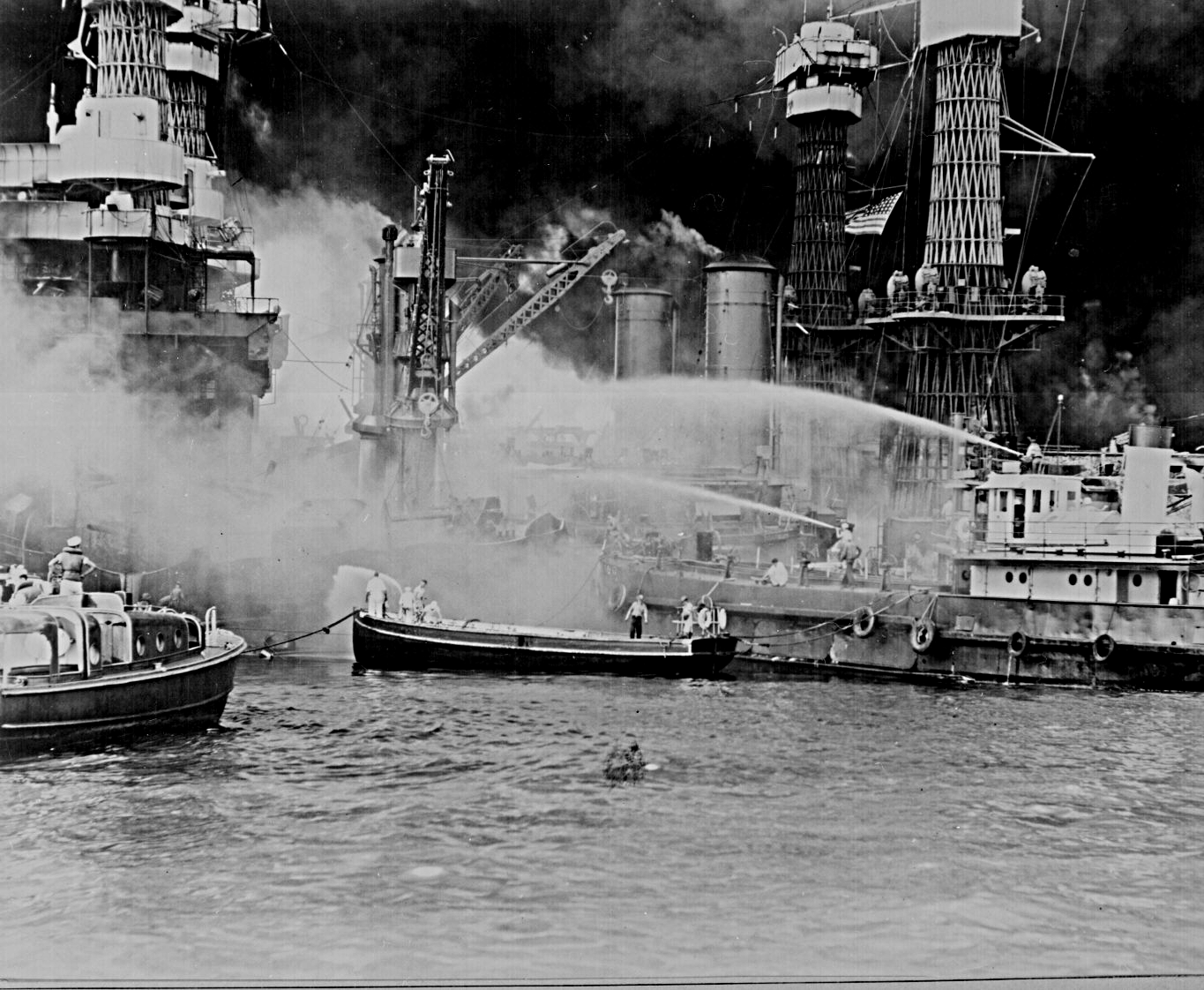
Hyperboloid mast towers were on the USS West Virginia aflame at Pearl Harbor on December 7, 1941.

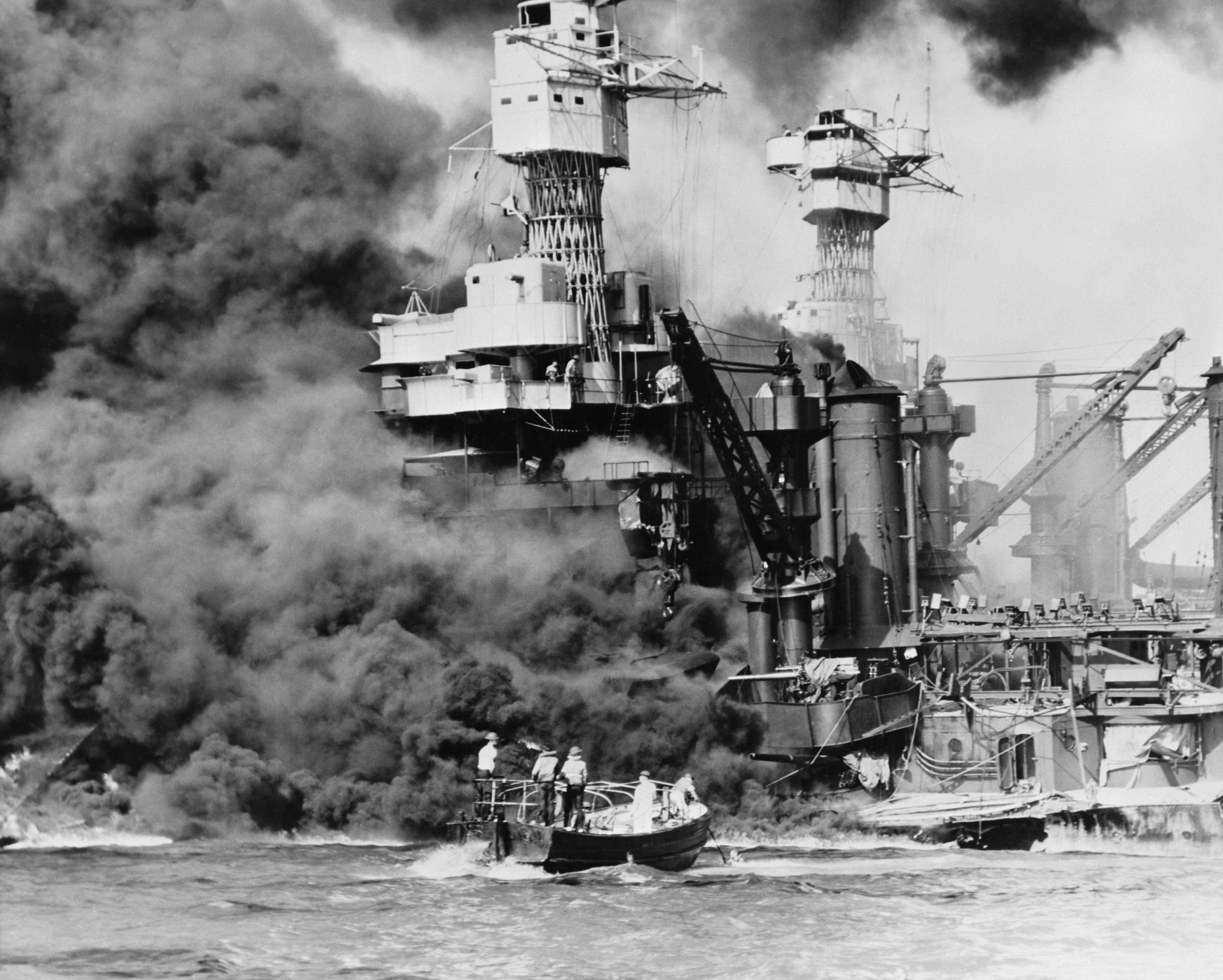
Hyperboloid mast towers were on the USS West Virginia aflame at Pearl Harbor on December 7, 1941, and a small boat rescues a seaman.

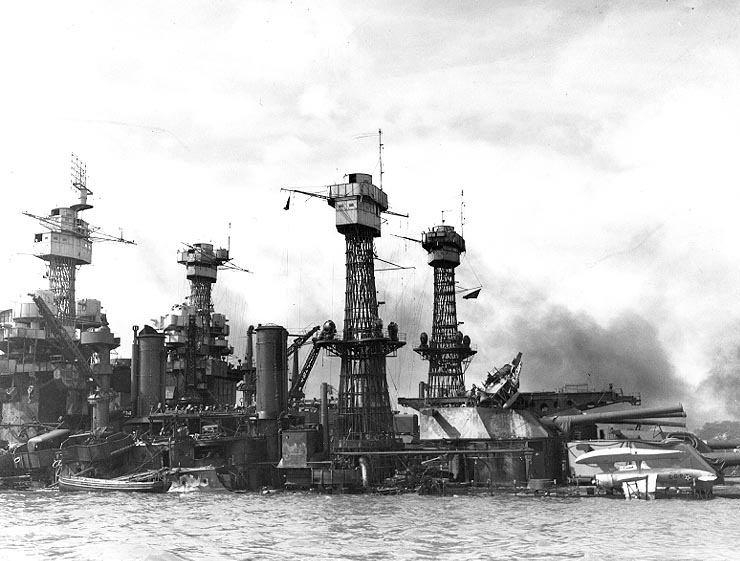
Hyperboloid towers of USS West Virginia, Pearl Harbor, 1941.
