= Vortex Tower =

Unbuilt skyscraper in London, England

The Vortex Tower was the working name of a London skyscraper design by Make Architects, a London-based business headed by Ken Shuttleworth. The building would have risen to a height of 980 feet (300 m) with 70 floors. The Vortex Tower was proposed for the edge of the City of London but was never built.

The planned shape of the Vortex Tower was a hyperboloid of revolution. The structure would have twisted into a spiral shape with a tapering centre and wide base. The project was based on a different concept, with rotation enabling the use of leaning columns as straight structural elements of hyperboloid.

Shuttleworth expressed surprise when the design was compared to that of the similar Kobe Port Tower, built in Japan in 1963. He said "I haven't seen it before and it was not a source of inspiration for the Vortex." and noted that the Kobe designers "did not use the full envelope of the building", and that the towers would be different colours.

== See also ==
- Hyperboloid structure
- List of hyperboloid structures
