= Crystal Island (building project) =

- Хрустальный Остров
- Project of the Crystal Island

General information
- Status: Never built
- Type: Mixed-use
- Location: Moscow, Russia

Height
- Antenna spire: 450 m (1,480 ft)

Design and construction
- Architect: Norman Foster

Crystal Island (Russian: Хрустальный Остров, romanized: Hrustal'nyy Ostrov) is a future building project in Moscow, Russia that is planned to have around 2,500,000 square meters (27,000,000 square ft) of floor space and a height of 450 meters (1,476 ft) designed by Norman Foster. At these dimensions upon completion, it would be the largest structure (in floor space) in the world. The architectural firm behind the design is Foster and Partners.

== History ==
The tent-like superstructure would rise to 450 m, and form a breathable "second skin" and thermal buffer for the main building, shielding the interior spaces from Moscow’s weather. This section skin will be sealed in winter to minimize heat loss, and opened in the summer to naturally cool the interior. The building would be integrated into a new park, which would provide a range of activities throughout the year, with cross-country skiing and ice skating in the winter.

It is stated to have a multitude of cultural, exhibition, performance, hotel, apartment, retail, and office space, as well as an international school for 500 students. The building would be powered by built-in solar panels and wind turbines. The structure would also feature on-site renewable and low-carbon energy generation.

In 2009, due to the 2008 financial crisis, financial backing for the project was lost, and construction of the project was postponed.

== See also ==
- Hyperboloid structure
- List of hyperboloid structures
- Arcology
