= Cockfosters Water Tower =

Water tower in London, England

Coordinates: 51.6588°N 0.1525°W

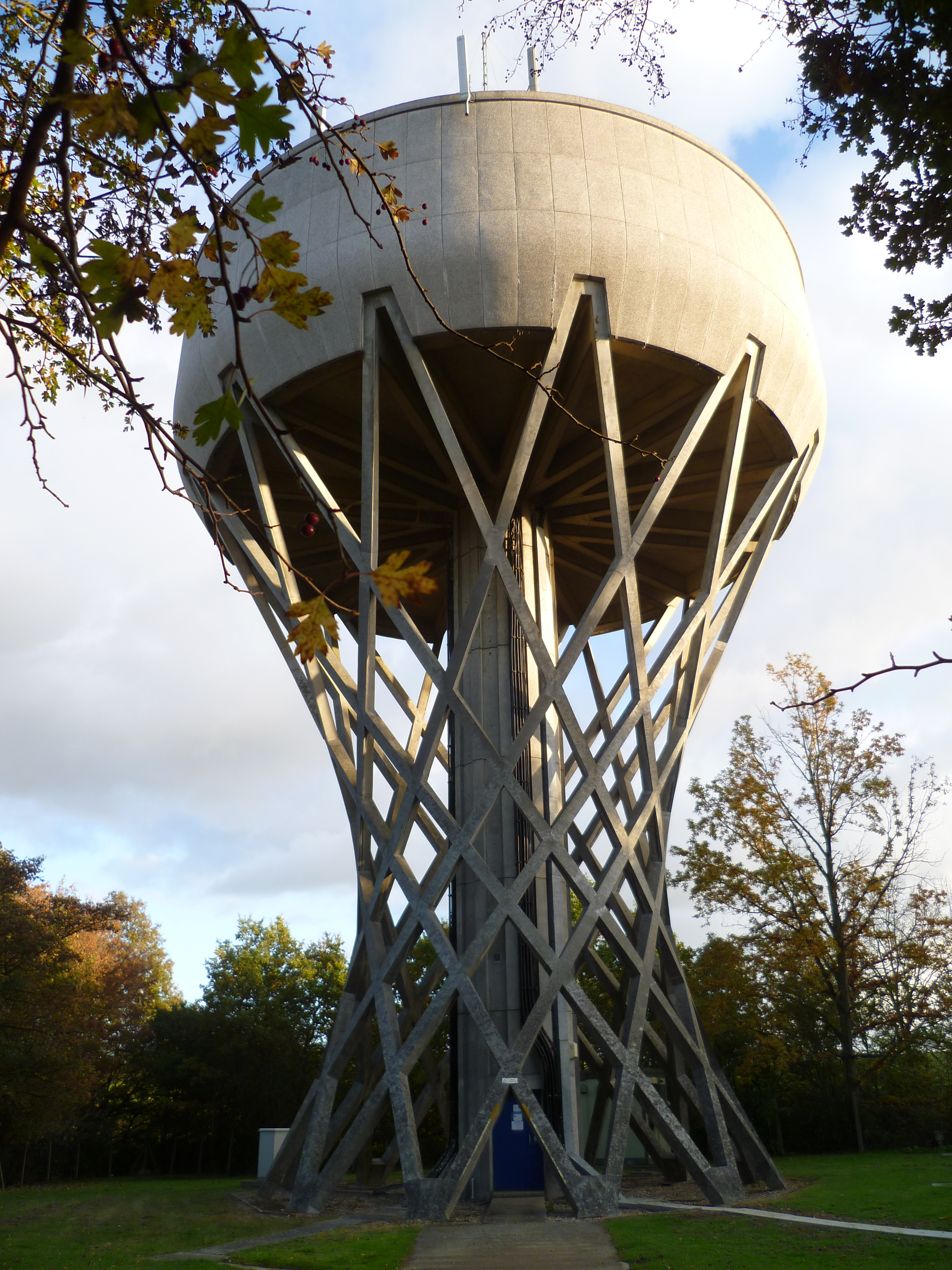
Cockfosters Water Tower

The Cockfosters Water Tower is a water tower in Cockfosters Road, north London, on the edge of Trent Park, that is known for its hyperboloid structure. It is adjacent to the Cockfosters Reservoir.

The tower was built in 1968 to a design by the architect Edmund C. Percey of Scherrer and Hicks, and J.W. Milne, chief engineer of the Lee Valley Water Company. It was later owned by Three Valley Water and Veolia Water and as of 2016, is owned by Affinity Water. It incorporates a supporting hyperboloid lattice of reinforced concrete and has a capacity of 1,130 m³. A number of mobile phone masts are located on the roof of the structure.

Percey also designed the grade II listed Tonwell Water Tower (1964).
