= Vasili Komaroff =

Russian serial killer

Vasili Komaroff Василий Комаров
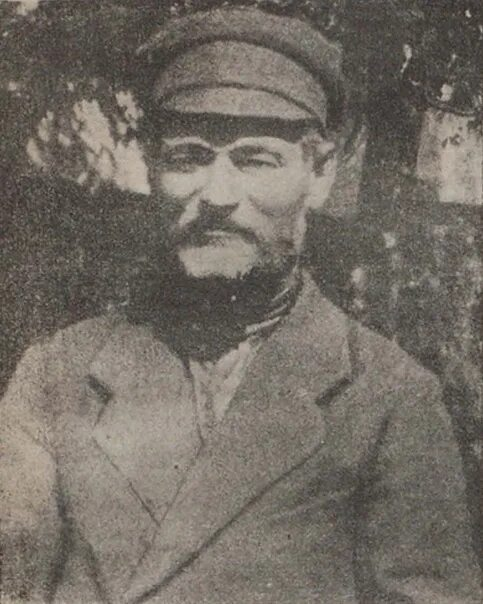
- Born: Vasily Terentyevich Petrov; 1 January 1871; Vitebsk Governorate, Russian Empire
- Died: 18 June 1923 (aged 52); Moscow, Russian SFSR, Soviet Union
- Cause of death: Execution by firing squad
- Other names: The Wolf of Moscow; The Shabolovka Street Killer
- Status: Executed
- Conviction: Murder
- Penalty: Death

Details
- Victims: 33
- Span of crimes: 1921–1923
- Country: Soviet Union

Vasili Ivanovich Komaroff (born Vasili Terentevich Petrov; Russian: Василий Терентьевич Петров; 1 January 1871 – 18 June 1923) was a Russian serial killer, convicted for the killing of 33 people in Moscow between 1921 and 1923. One of the earliest known serial killers in the Soviet Union, Komaroff was a horse trader who murdered at least 33 customers in the stable next to his home, and was executed on 18 June 1923.

== Background ==
Vasili Terentevich Petrov, in 1871, was born to a large poor family in Vitebsk Governorate, Russian Empire. Many members of Petrov's family suffered from alcoholism, and he began drinking at age 15. Petrov had been conscripted into the Russian army for 4 years, and at age 28 he married. In 1904, during the Russian-Japanese War, Petrov travelled to the Far East where he managed to earn a small fortune, but he soon wasted the money. Petrov received a one-year prison sentence for robbing a military warehouse, and while serving his sentence his wife died from cholera. After his release, he settled in Riga (now in Latvia) where he married a Polish widow named Sophia, with whom he had two children. Petrov, still an alcoholic, often beat his wife and children.

In 1915, during World War I when troops of the German Empire entered the Baltic, Petrov and his family moved to the Volga region in Russia. When the Russian Empire began to collapse in 1917, Petrov joined the Red Army during the October Revolution, learning to read and write and rising to the position of platoon commander. While fighting in the Russian Civil War, he was captured by the White Army troops of General Denikin. Petrov managed to escape, but to avoid the judgment of the Military Revolutionary Tribunal he changed his name to Vasili Ivanovich Komaroff (Russian: Василий Иванович Комаров; alternately spelled Komarov), and in 1920 moved to Moscow with his family. Vasili Komaroff settled in 26 Shabolovka Street, where he began working as a carriage driver and horse trader, as well as continuing his thievery.

== Murders ==
In February 1921, when Vladimir Lenin declared the New Economic Policy which allowed private enterprise, Vasili Komaroff began to commit his first murders. All killings followed a single formula: Komaroff became acquainted with a client who wanted to buy a horse, where he brought them to his home and served them vodka. The victim would be killed with a hammer or sometimes have their throat slit, afterwards the corpse was placed into a bag and then either hidden around the house, buried underground, or dumped in the Moscow River. The following year Komarov's wife Sophia found out about the murders but reacted to it calmly, and began participating in the killings herself. In 1921 he committed at least 17 murders, in the next two years - still at least 12 murders, although he later confessed to 33 murders.

Police began to notice a series of murders had started occurring around Moscow when the bodies of 21 men were discovered after being disposed of in sacks of garbage every Thursday or Saturday, leading the police to a two-year investigation. Komaroff was known as a happily married man, but those close to the family knew that he was extremely abusive, and had once tried to kill his eight-year-old son. Spectators in the market where he went to sell his horses began to notice that he came every Wednesday and Friday, often without bringing a horse, and almost always left with a customer.

== Arrest and conviction ==
In early 1923, police showed up at Komaroff's home originally about illegal alcohol, but during the search of their stable they discovered his latest victim under a stack of hay. Komaroff managed to evade the police by jumping out of a window, but on 18 March 1923, he was arrested in Moscow Oblast. While undergoing police interrogation, he admitted to having killed 33 men, as far as he could remember, who were looking to buy one of his horses. Robbery was noted as a motive for the murders, although the collective amount he earned from all of his killings was very low. After confessing to his crimes, Komaroff led the police to the places where he had disposed of the bodies. However, only 6 of the remaining 12 were found. When he was interviewed about his crimes, he described killing as "an awfully easy job." While he was in prison, he attempted to commit suicide three times. His wife Sophia was also found guilty of murder since the police concluded that it would be impossible for her not to have known what her husband was doing inside the stable next to their home. The forensic psychiatric examination found Komarov sane, although it recognized him as an alcoholic degenerate and a psychopath.

Komaroff and Sophia were both sentenced to death and were executed by firing squad in Moscow on 18 June 1923.

== See also ==
- List of serial killers by number of victims
- see the feuilleton by Mikhail Bulgakov entitled "The Komarov Case"

== Bibliography and further reading ==
- Hall, Susan (5 January 2021). The World Encyclopedia of Serial Killers, Volume Four T–Z. WildBlue Press. ISBN 978-1-952225-35-2.
- Parker, R. J. (29 September 2017). Serial Killers Encyclopedia: The Encyclopedia of Serial Killers from A to Z. Rj Parker Publishing. ISBN 978-1-4947-7216-1.
- Rakitin, Alexei (1 January 2016). Социализм не порождает преступности. Серийная преступность в СССР. Историко-криминалистический анализ [Socialism Doesn't Breed Crime. Serial Crime in the USSR: A Historical and Forensic Analysis] (in Russian). Armchair Scientist. ISBN 978-5-7525-3028-9.
- Rosenfeld, Harvey (2009). Depravity: A Narrative of 16 Serial Killers. iUniverse. ISBN 978-1-4401-2847-9.
- Simpson, Paul (18 May 2017). The Serial Killer Files. Little, Brown Book Group. ISBN 978-1-4721-3673-2.
- Warren, Alan (10 June 2024). Murderous Minds Soviet Union. Alan R. Warren. ISBN 978-1-989980-36-1.
