= Shukhov Tower (disambiguation) =

Shukhov Tower is a broadcasting tower in Moscow, Russia.

Shukhov Tower may also refer to:

== Russia ==
- Shukhov Tower on the Oka River, an electric power transmission tower in Nizhny Novgorod
- Shukhov Tower in Polibino, the world's first diagrid hyperboloid structure
