= Alan Warren =

Alan Warren may refer to:

- Alan Warren (sailor) (born 1935), British sailor
- Alan Warren (priest) (1932-2020), Anglican priest and author
- Alan Warren (philatelist), American philatelist
- Alan R. Warren (born 1962), Canadian radio host

== See also ==
- Allan Warren (born 1948), English society-photographer, writer and former actor
- Allen Warren (1931–1974), Australian rules footballer
