= Shabolovka =

Shabolovka may refer to one of the following:

- Shabolovka Street in Moscow
- Shabolovka tower, a radio tower in Moscow
- Shabolovskaya, a station in Moscow Metro
