= Hyperboloid structure =

Type of unbounded quadratic surface-shaped building or work

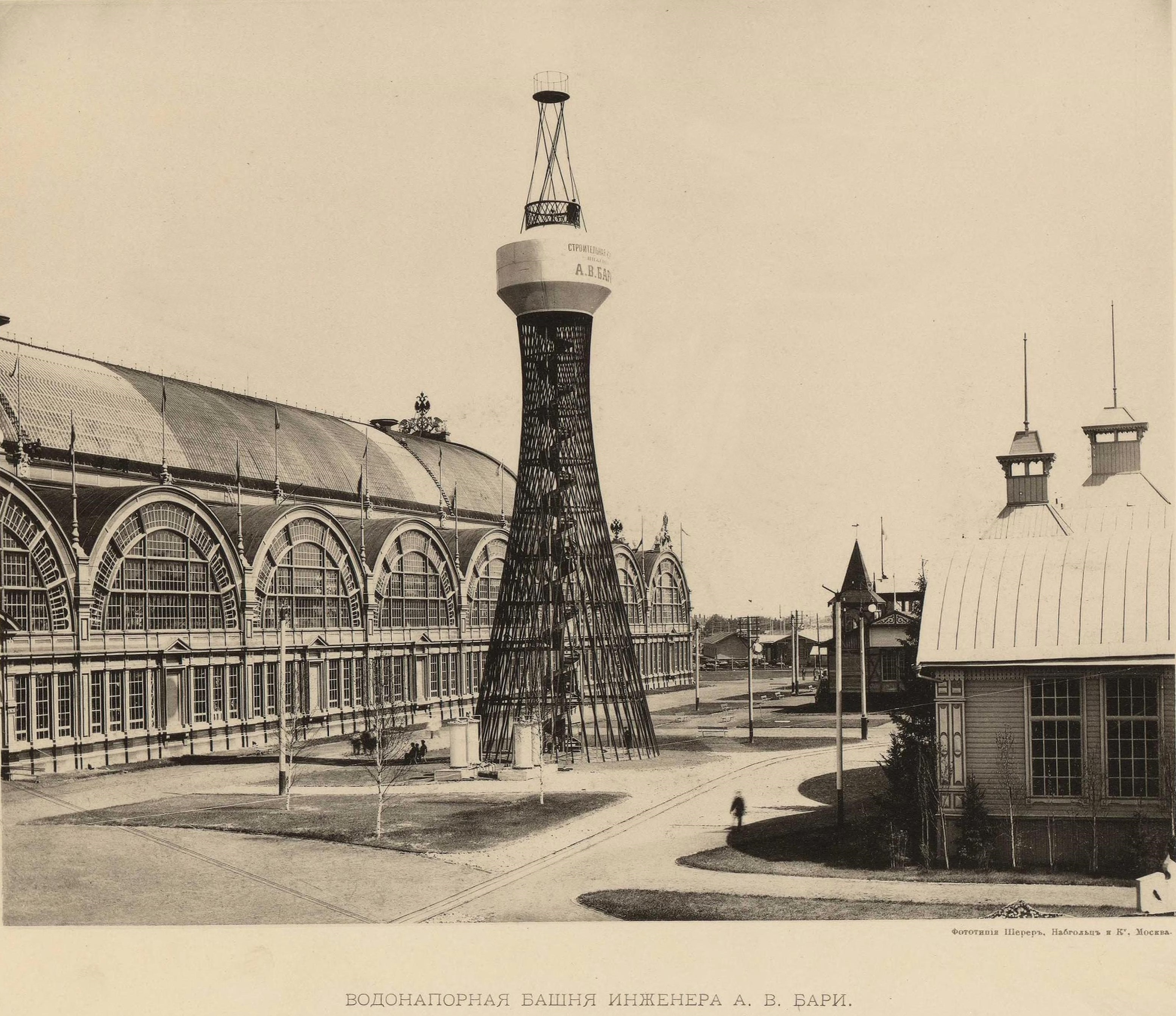
Shukhov Tower, a lattice 37-meter water tower by Vladimir Shukhov. All-Russian Exposition, Nizhny Novgorod, Russia, 1896

Hyperboloid structures are architectural structures designed using a hyperboloid in one sheet. Often these are tall structures, such as towers, where the hyperboloid geometry's structural strength is used to support an object high above the ground. Hyperboloid geometry is often used for decorative effect as well as structural economy. The first hyperboloid structures were built by Russian engineer Vladimir Shukhov (1853–1939), including the Shukhov Tower in Polibino, Dankovsky District, Lipetsk Oblast, Russia.

A hyperbolic paraboloid structure (also called a hypar) is a load-bearing structure with the shape of a truncated region of an infinite hyperbolic paraboloid. It's a doubly ruled and saddle surface, with perpendicular cross sections shaped like a hyperbola and a parabola. In architecture, it is often used as a saddle roof, which can be easily built using linear supports (straight line segments). In biology, it forms naturally a strong surface that won't buckle under compression.

== Properties ==
Hyperbolic structures have a negative Gaussian curvature, meaning they curve inward rather than curving outward or being straight. As doubly ruled surfaces, they can be made with a lattice of straight beams, hence are easier to build than curved surfaces that do not have a ruling and must instead be built with curved beams.

Hyperboloid structures are superior in stability against outside forces compared with "straight" buildings, but have shapes often creating large amounts of unusable volume (low space efficiency). Hence they are more commonly used in purpose-driven structures, such as water towers (to support a large mass), cooling towers, and aesthetic features.

A hyperbolic structure is beneficial for cooling towers. At the bottom, the widening of the tower provides a large area for installation of fill to promote thin film evaporative cooling of the circulated water. As the water first evaporates and rises, the narrowing effect helps accelerate the laminar flow, and then as it widens out, contact between the heated air and atmospheric air supports turbulent mixing.

== Work of Shukhov ==
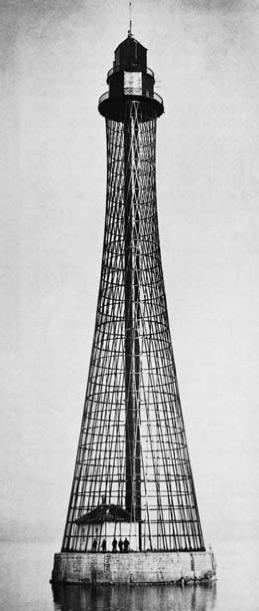
Hyperboloid lattice Adziogol Lighthouse by V.G. Shukhov near Kherson, 1911

In the 1880s, Shukhov began to work on the problem of the design of roof systems to use a minimum of materials, time and labor. His calculations were most likely derived from mathematician Pafnuty Chebyshev's work on the theory of best approximations of functions. Shukhov's mathematical explorations of efficient roof structures led to his invention of a new system that was innovative both structurally and spatially. By applying his analytical skills to the doubly curved surfaces Nikolai Lobachevsky named "hyperbolic", Shukhov derived a family of equations that led to new structural and constructional systems, known as hyperboloids of revolution and hyperbolic paraboloids.

The steel gridshells of the exhibition pavilions of the 1896 All-Russian Industrial and Handicrafts Exposition in Nizhny Novgorod were the first publicly prominent examples of Shukhov's new system. Two pavilions of this type were built for the Nizhni Novgorod exposition, one oval in plan and one circular. The roofs of these pavilions were doubly curved gridshells formed entirely of a lattice of straight angle-iron and flat iron bars. Shukhov himself called them azhurnaia bashnia ("lace tower", i.e., lattice tower). The patent of this system, for which Shukhov applied in 1895, was awarded in 1899.

Shukhov also turned his attention to the development of an efficient and easily constructed structural system (gridshell) for a tower carrying a large load at the top – the problem of the water tower. His solution was inspired by observing the action of a woven basket supporting a heavy weight. Again, it took the form of a doubly curved surface constructed of a light network of straight iron bars and angle iron. Over the next 20 years, he designed and built nearly 200 of these towers, no two exactly alike, most with heights in the range of 12m to 68m.

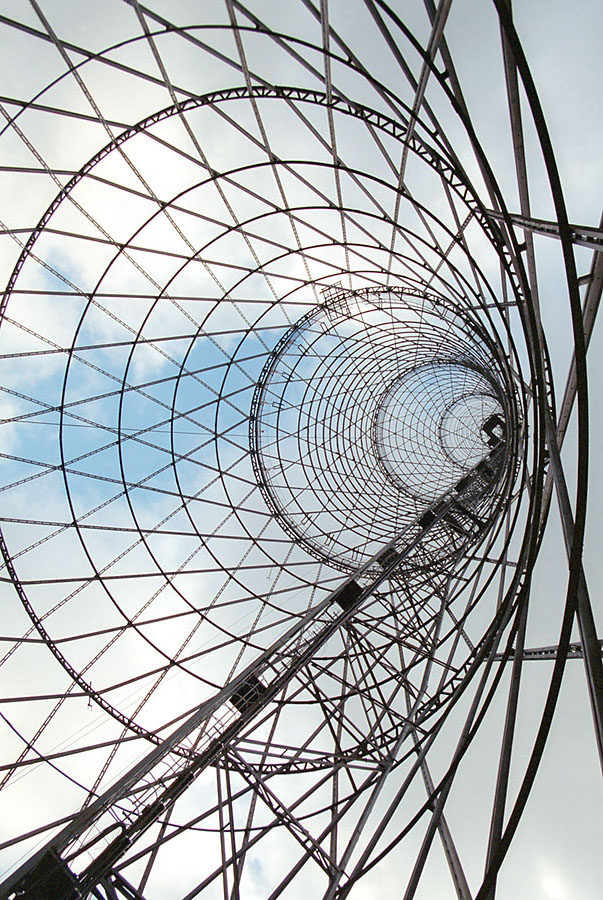
The gridshell of Shukhov Tower in Moscow

At least as early as 1911, Shukhov began experimenting with the concept of forming a tower out of stacked sections of hyperboloids. Stacking the sections permitted the form of the tower to taper more at the top, with a less pronounced "waist" between the shape-defining rings at bottom and top. Increasing the number of sections would increase the tapering of the overall form, to the point that it began to resemble a cone.

By 1918 Shukhov had developed this concept into the design of a nine-section stacked hyperboloid radio broadcasting tower in Moscow. Shukhov designed a 350m tower, which would have surpassed the Eiffel Tower in height by 50m, while using less than a quarter of the amount of material. His design, as well as the full set of supporting calculations analyzing the hyperbolic geometry and sizing the network of members, was completed by February 1919. However, the 2200 tons of steel required to build the tower to 350m were not available. In July 1919, Lenin decreed that the tower should be built to a height of 150m, and the necessary steel was to be made available from the army's supplies. Construction of the smaller tower with six stacked hyperboloids began within a few months, and Shukhov Tower was completed by March 1922.

== Other architects ==
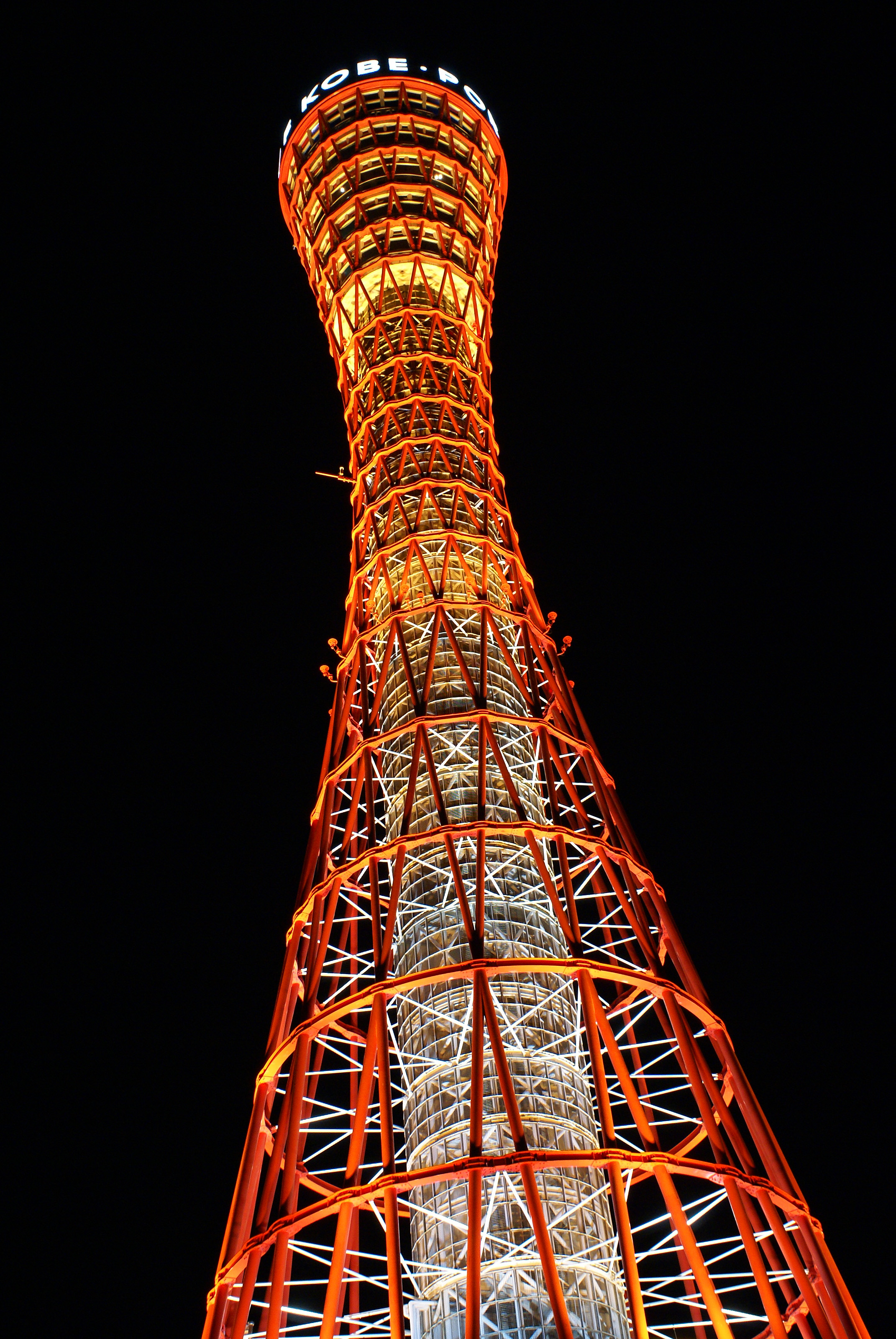
Hyperboloid tower in Kōbe, Japan

Antoni Gaudi and Shukhov carried out experiments with hyperboloid structures nearly simultaneously, but independently, in 1880–1895. Antoni Gaudi used structures in the form of hyperbolic paraboloid (hypar) and hyperboloid of revolution in the Sagrada Família in 1910. In the Sagrada Família, there are a few places on the nativity facade – a design not equated with Gaudi's ruled-surface design, where the hyperboloid crops up. All around the scene with the pelican, there are numerous examples (including the basket held by one of the figures). There is a hyperboloid adding structural stability to the cypress tree (by connecting it to the bridge). The "bishop's mitre" spires are capped with hyperboloids.

In the Palau Güell, there is one set of interior columns along the main facade with hyperbolic capitals. The crown of the famous parabolic vault is a hyperboloid. The vault of one of the stables at the Church of Colònia Güell is a hyperboloid. There is a unique column in the Park Güell that is a hyperboloid. The famous Spanish engineer and architect Eduardo Torroja designed a thin-shell water tower in Fedala and the roof of Hipódromo de la Zarzuela in the form of hyperboloid of revolution. Le Corbusier and Félix Candela used hyperboloid structures (hypar).

A hyperboloid cooling tower by Frederik van Iterson and Gerard Kuypers was patented in the Netherlands on August 16, 1916. The first Van Iterson cooling tower was built and put to use at the Dutch State Mine (DSM) Emma in 1918. A whole series of the same and later designs would follow.

The Georgia Dome (1992) was the first Hypar-Tensegrity dome to be built.

== Gallery ==
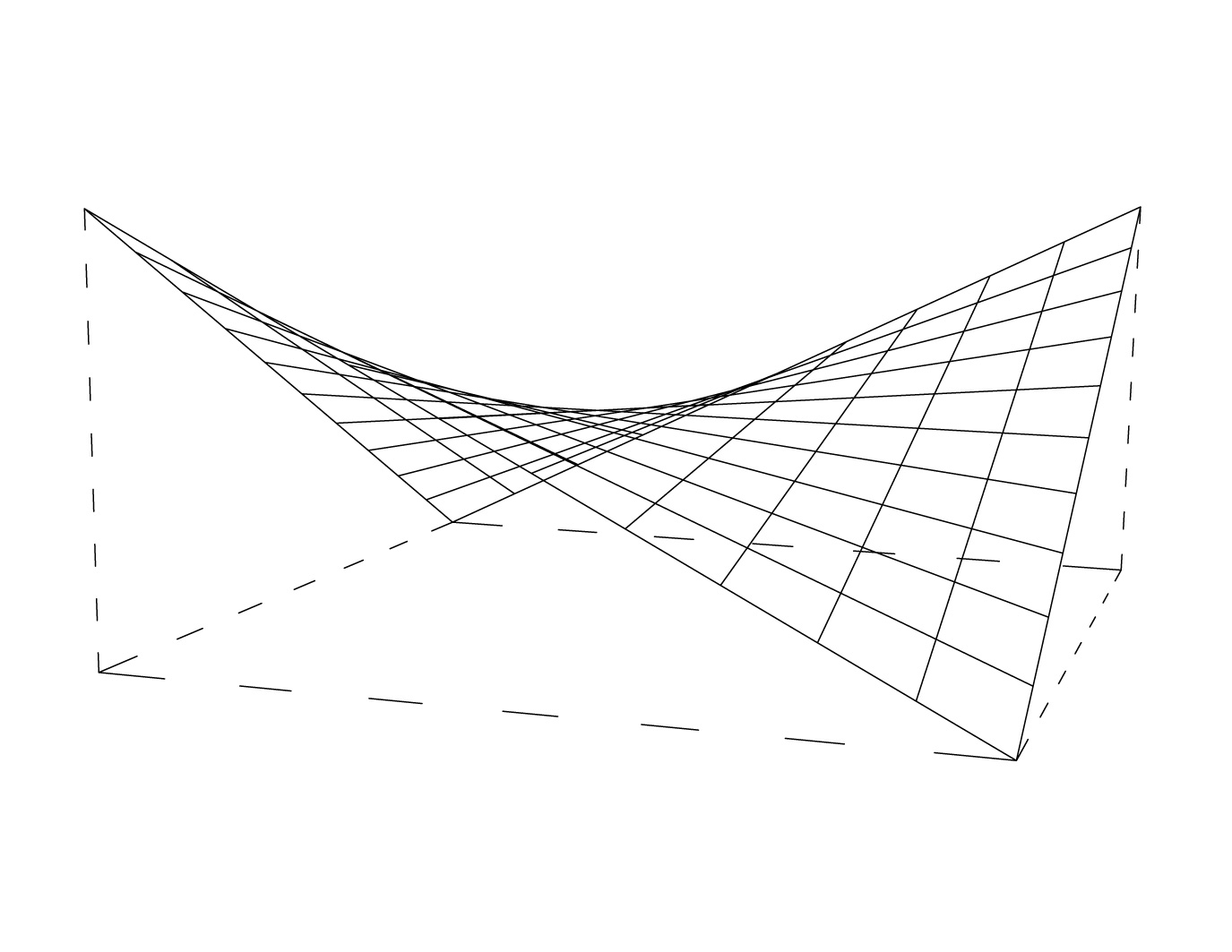
The hyperbolic paraboloid is a doubly ruled surface so it may be used to construct a saddle roof from straight beams.

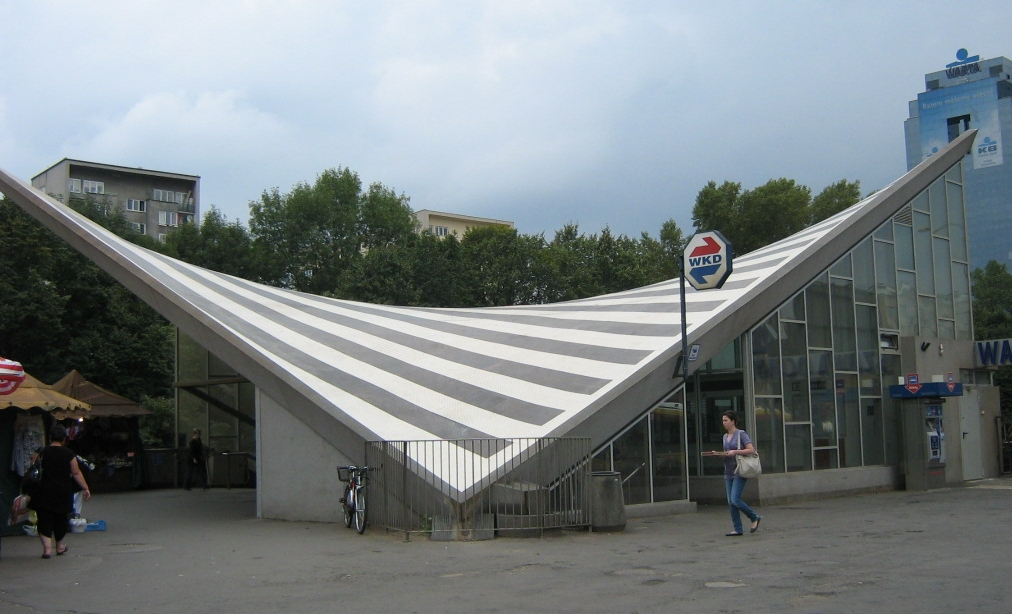
The Warszawa Ochota railway station has a hyperbolic paraboloid saddle roof. Warsaw, Poland, 1962.

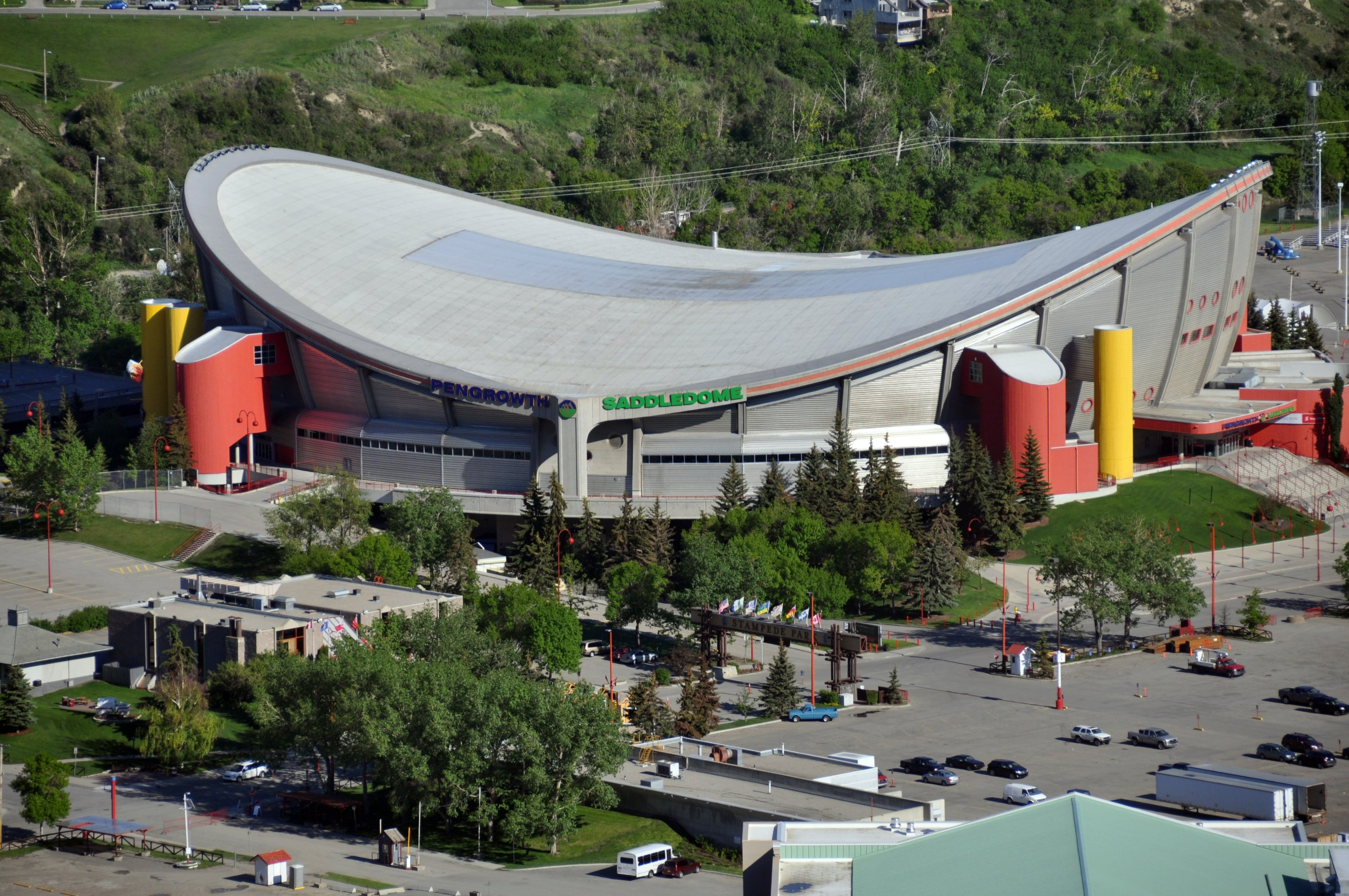
The Scotiabank Saddledome arena has a hyperbolic paraboloid saddle roof, Calgary, Canada, 1983.

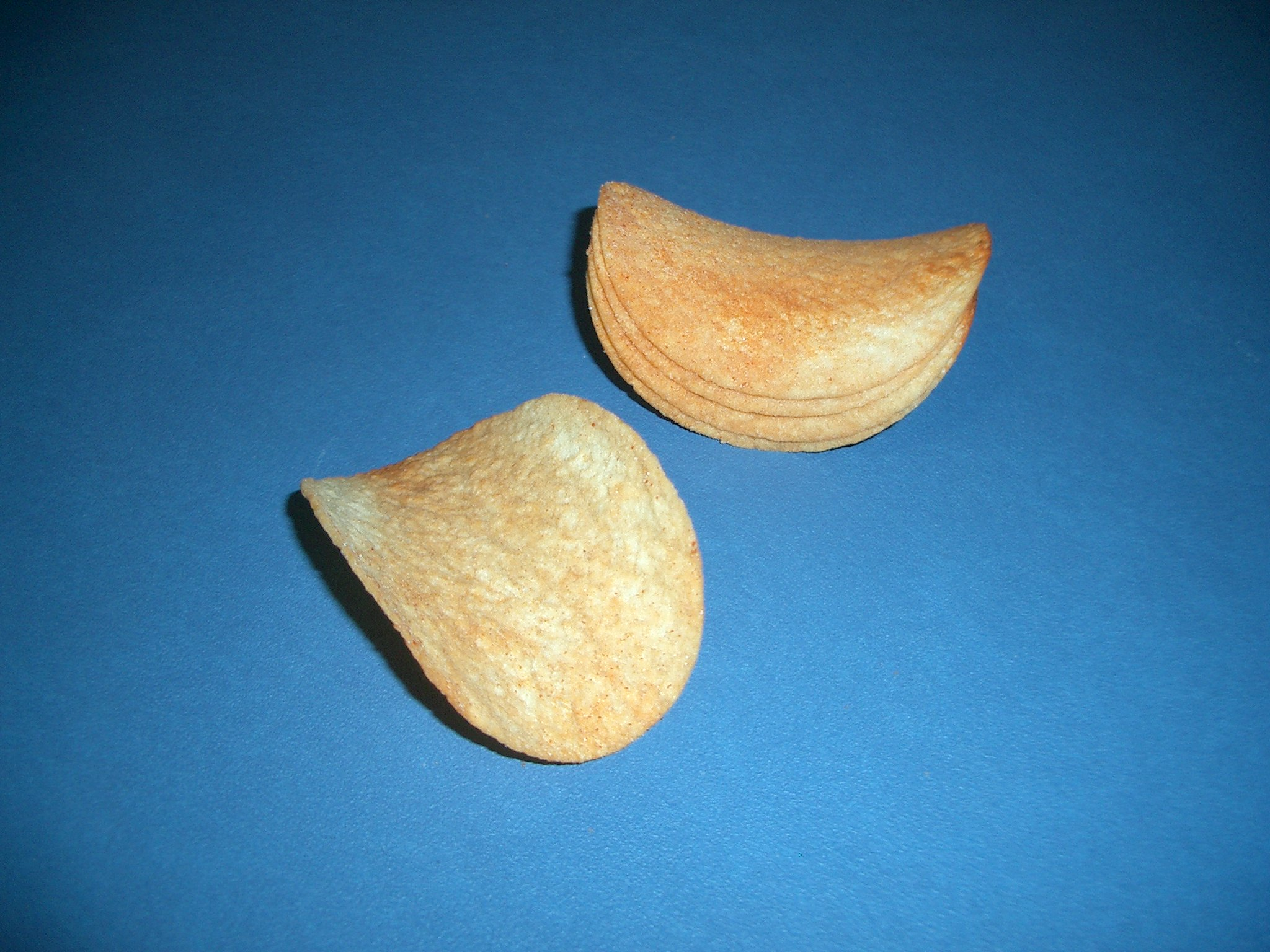
Stackable Pringles chips are hyperbolic paraboloids.

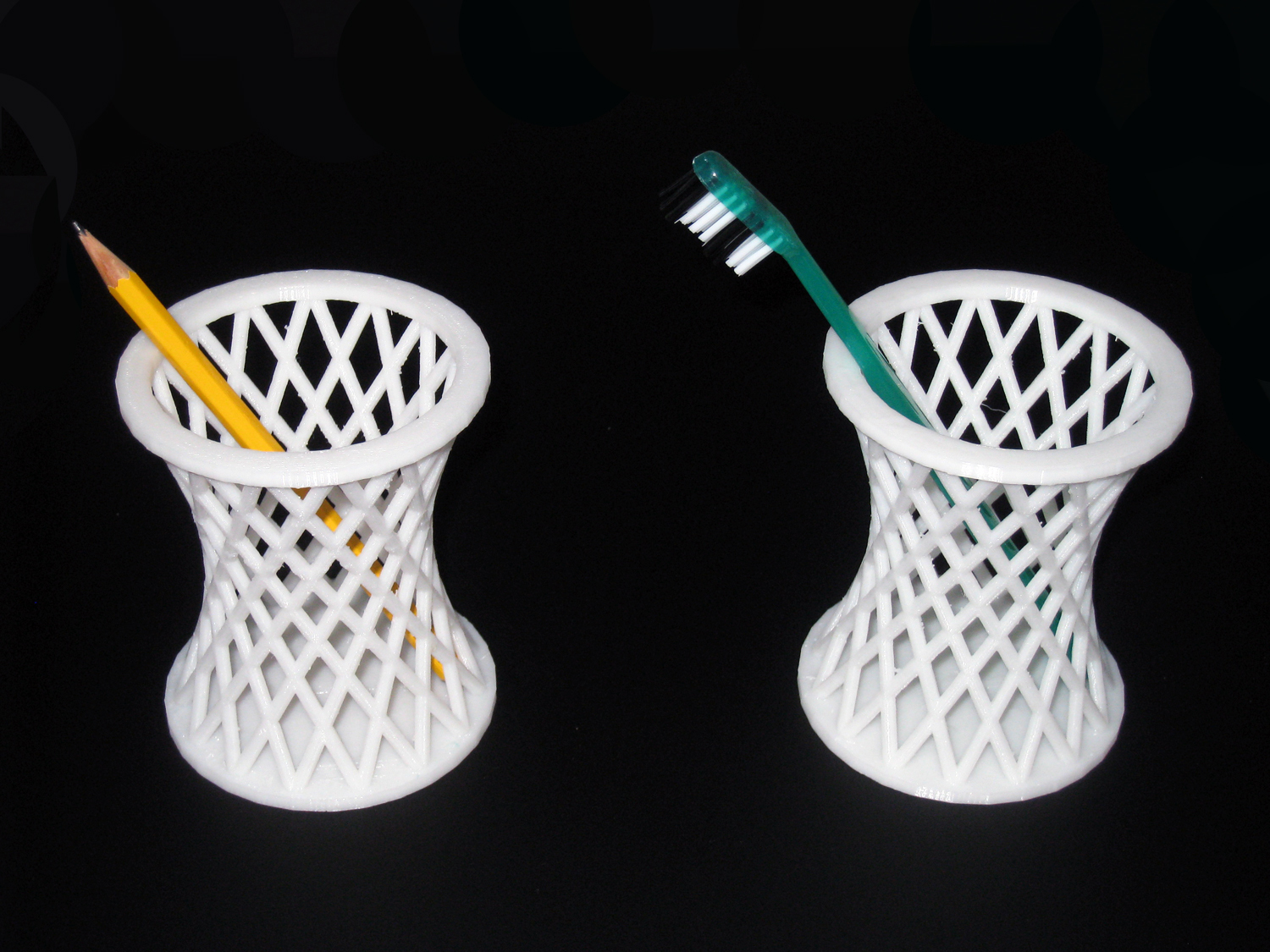
3D-printed dual-use pen/toothbrush holder-cup. Printed on Ultimaker 2, 2015

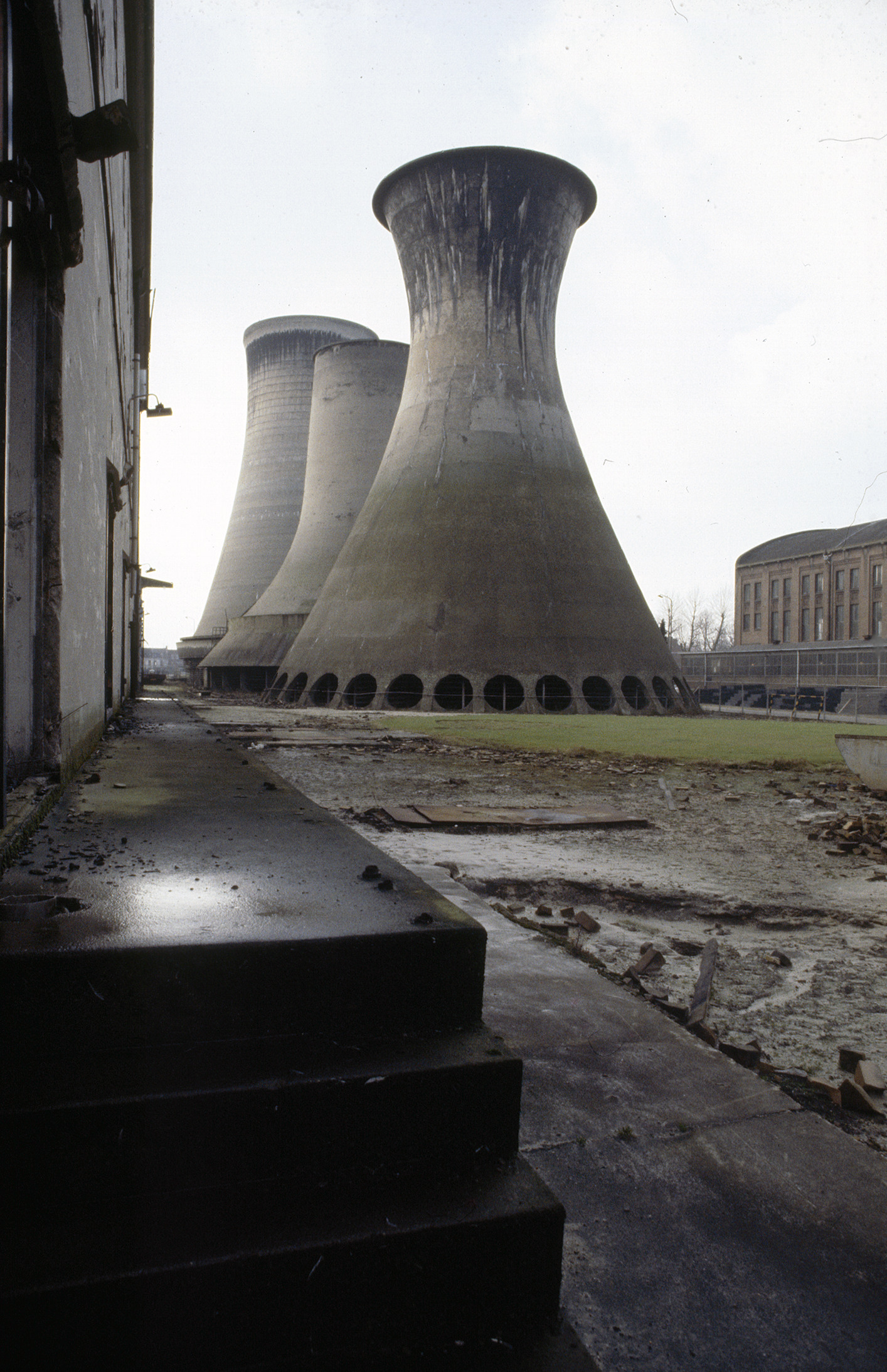
The first 1918 Van Iterson cooling tower, 1984

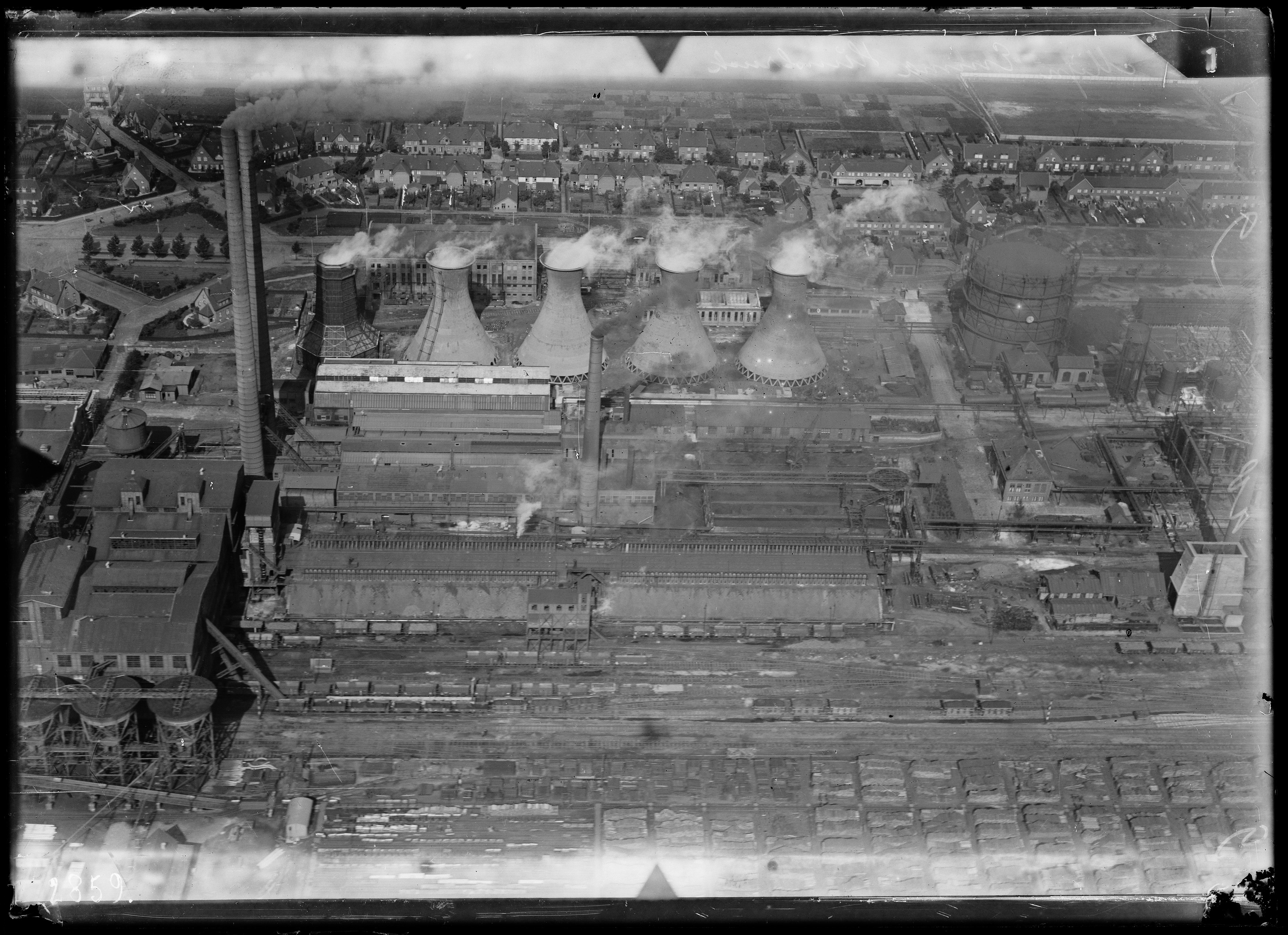
Five cooling towers in a row at DSM Emma, around 1930

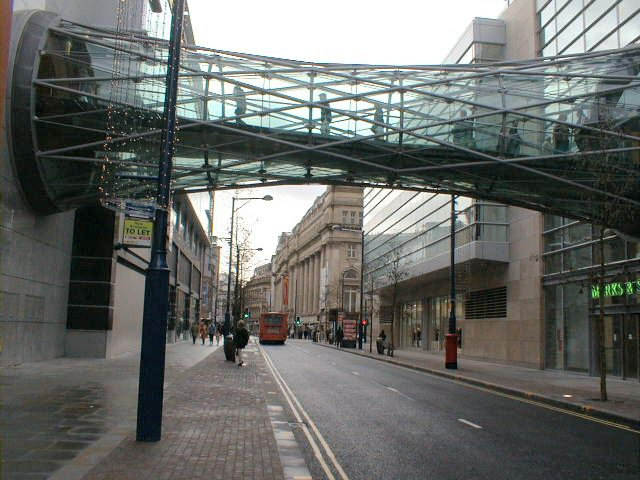
The Corporation Street Bridge is a horizontal doubly ruled hyperboloid structure, Manchester, England, 1999.

== See also ==
- Geodesic dome
- Lattice mast
- List of thin-shell structures
- Sam Scorer
- Tensile structure
- World's first hyperboloid structure
