= Stepan Nechayev =

Russian historian and politician (1792–1860)

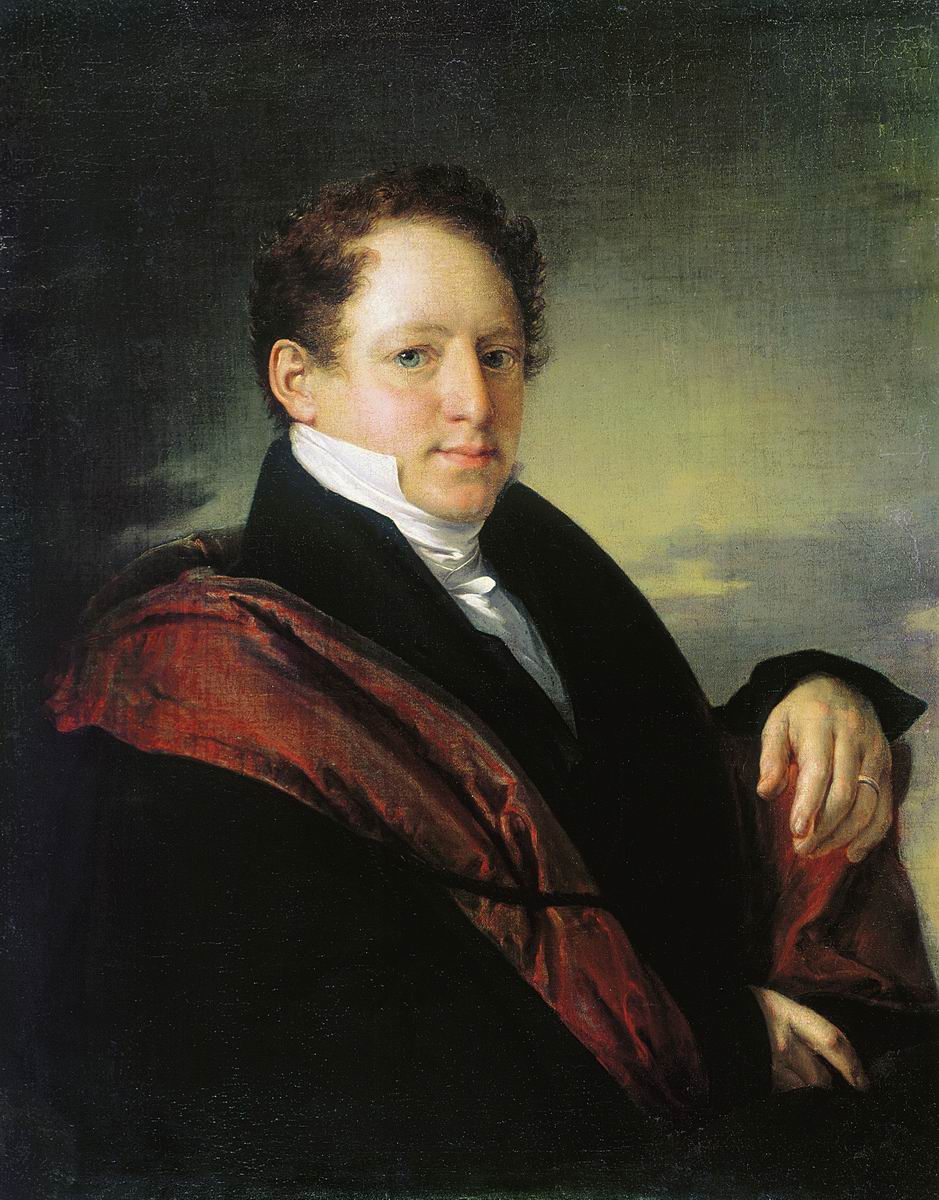
Nechaev's portrait by Vasily Tropinin

Stepan Dmitriyevich Nechayev (Russian: Степан Дмитриевич Нечаев; 18 July 1792–5 September 1860) was a Russian aristocrat and landowner who served as Procurator of the Most Holy Synod (between 1833 and 1836) and a member of the Governing Senate (after 1836). He was based at Polibino.

Nechayev was the first to study the materials about the Kulikovo Field. He picked up some findings on the place of the Battle of Kulikovo and created a private museum in the Polibino country estate, using those findings. He was the first who carried out the location researches and tried to connect the description of the Battle of Kulikovo with the real landscape. In 1848, he commissioned Alexander Brullov to design a memorial column for the Kulikovo Field, which was unveiled in 1852 and still stands. There are records about some other collections of the archeological findings from the Kulikovo Field, part of which was in his possession.

His son Yury Nechaev-Maltsov inherited the surname and glassworks of his maternal uncle Maltsov. The village of Gus was the main center of his business activities.
