= Polibino =

One of several places in Russia

Polibino (Russian: Полибино) is the name of several rural localities in Russia:

- Polibino, Chuvash Republic, a selo (village) in Semenovskoye Rural Settlement of Poretsky District of the Chuvash Republic
- Polibino, Dankovsky District, Lipetsk Oblast, a selo in Polibinsky Selsoviet of Dankovsky District of Lipetsk Oblast
- Polibino, Zadonsky District, Lipetsk Oblast, a village in Khmelinetsky Selsoviet of Zadonsky District of Lipetsk Oblast
- Polibino, Orenburg Oblast, a selo in Polibinsky Selsoviet of Buguruslansky District of Orenburg Oblast
- Polibino, Pskovsky District, Pskov Oblast, a village in Pskovsky District, Pskov Oblast
- Polibino, Velikoluksky District, Pskov Oblast, a village in Velikoluksky District, Pskov Oblast
- Polibino, Smolensk Oblast, a village in Polibinskoye Rural Settlement of Dorogobuzhsky District of Smolensk Oblast
- Polibino, Tula Oblast, a village in Streshnevsky Rural Okrug of Tyoplo-Ogaryovsky District of Tula Oblast
- Polibino (Podgorodnenskoye Rural Settlement), Toropetsky District, Tver Oblast, a village in Toropetsky District, Tver Oblast; municipally, a part of Podgorodnenskoye Rural Settlement of that district
- Polibino (Skvortsovskoye Rural Settlement), Toropetsky District, Tver Oblast, a village in Toropetsky District, Tver Oblast; municipally, a part of Skvortsovskoye Rural Settlement of that district
- Polibino (Ploskoshskoye Rural Settlement), Toropetsky District, Tver Oblast, a village in Toropetsky District, Tver Oblast; municipally, a part of Ploskoshskoye Rural Settlement of that district
