= Polibino, Dankovsky District, Lipetsk Oblast =

Rural locality (selo) in Lipetsk Oblast, Russia

Coordinates: 53°30′14″N 38°58′43″E

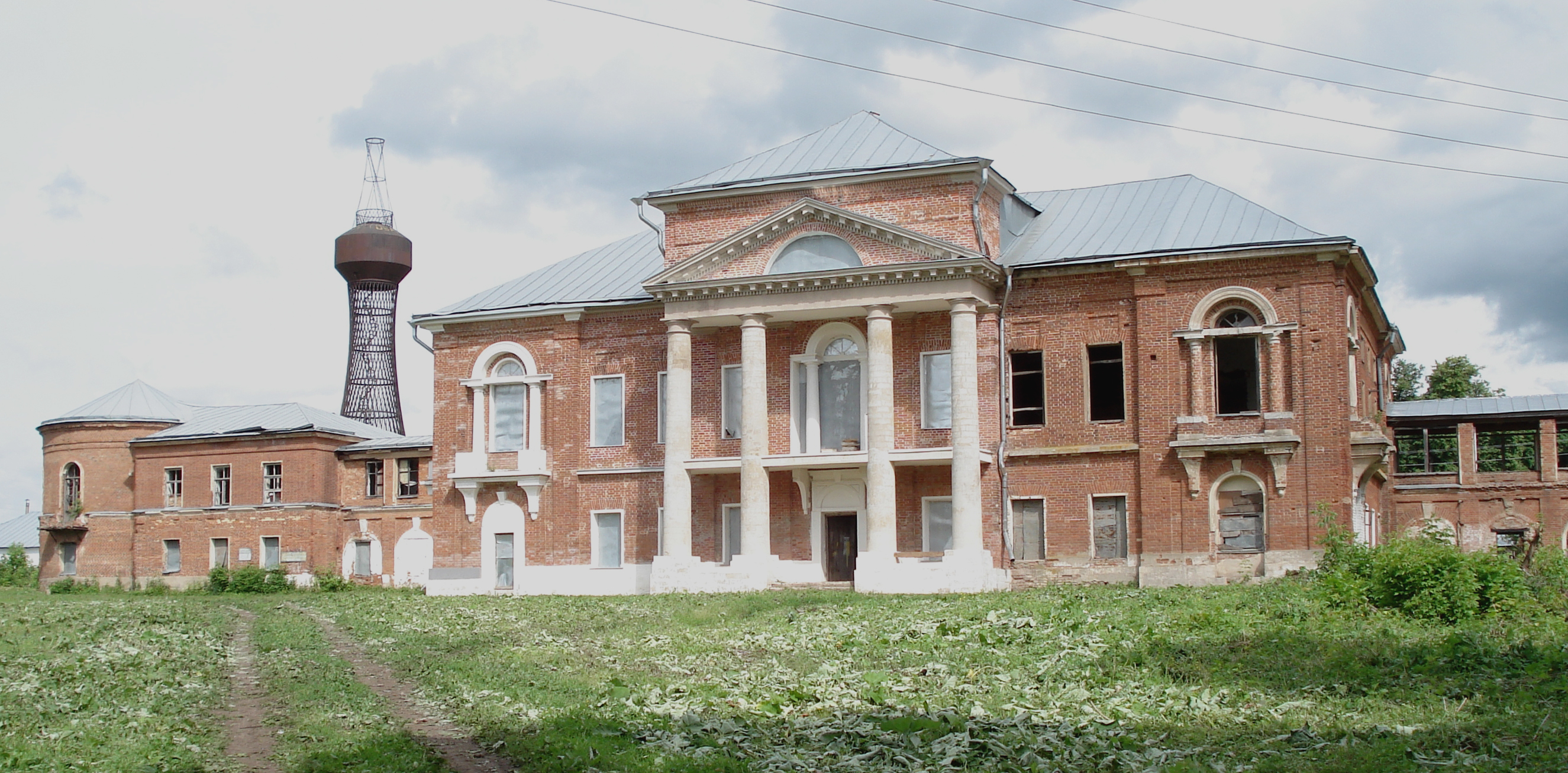
19th century Nechaev Palace, built by architect Vasily Bazhenov. The Shukhov tower is seen on the background.

Polibino (Russian: Полибино) is a rural locality (a selo) in Dankovsky District of Lipetsk Oblast, Russia. It serves as the administrative center of Polibinsky Selsoviet, one of the fifteen selsoviets into which the district is administratively divided. Municipally, it is the administrative center of Polibinskoye Rural Settlement.

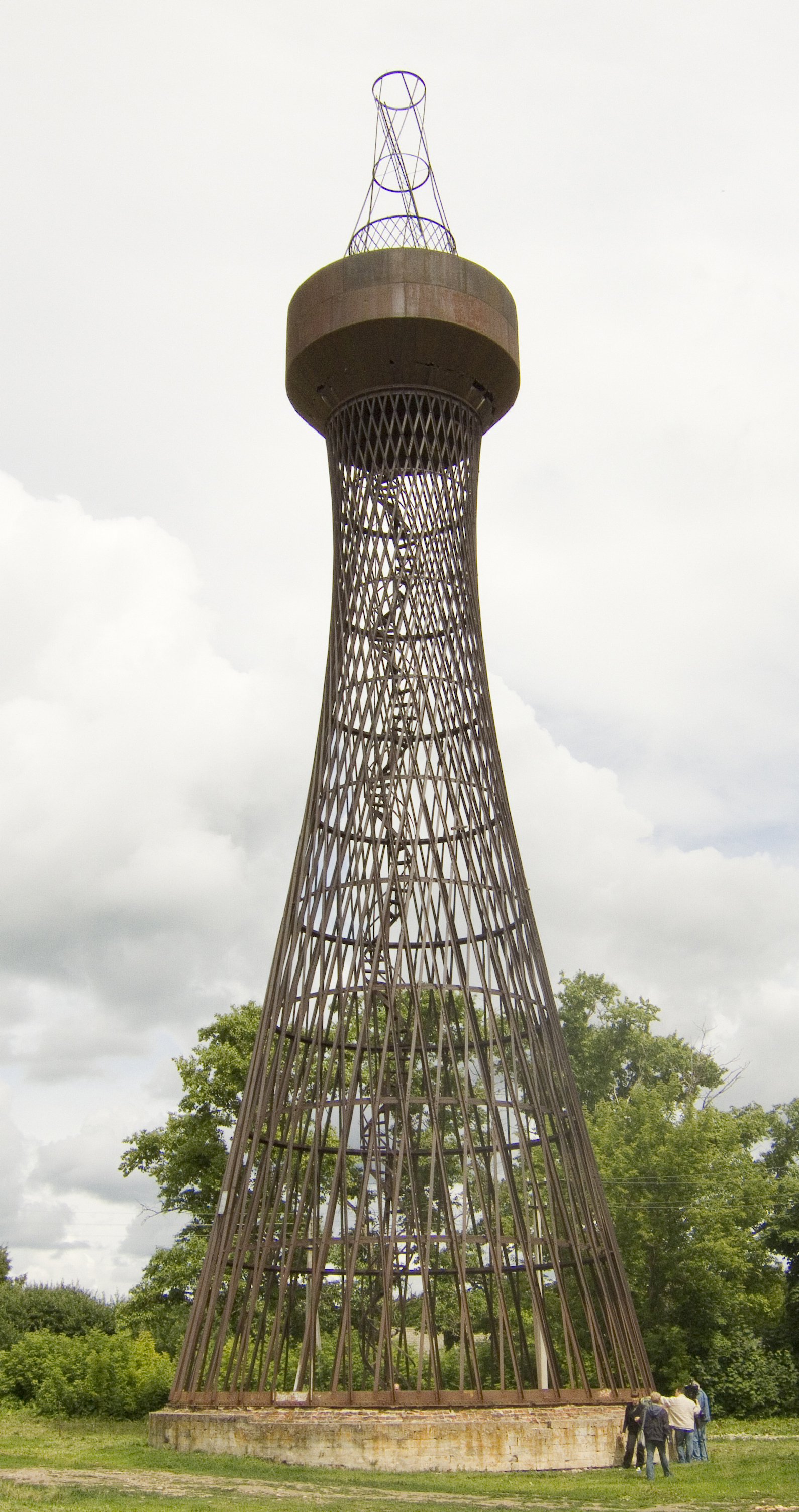
World's first hyperboloid structure, the first Shukhov's tower

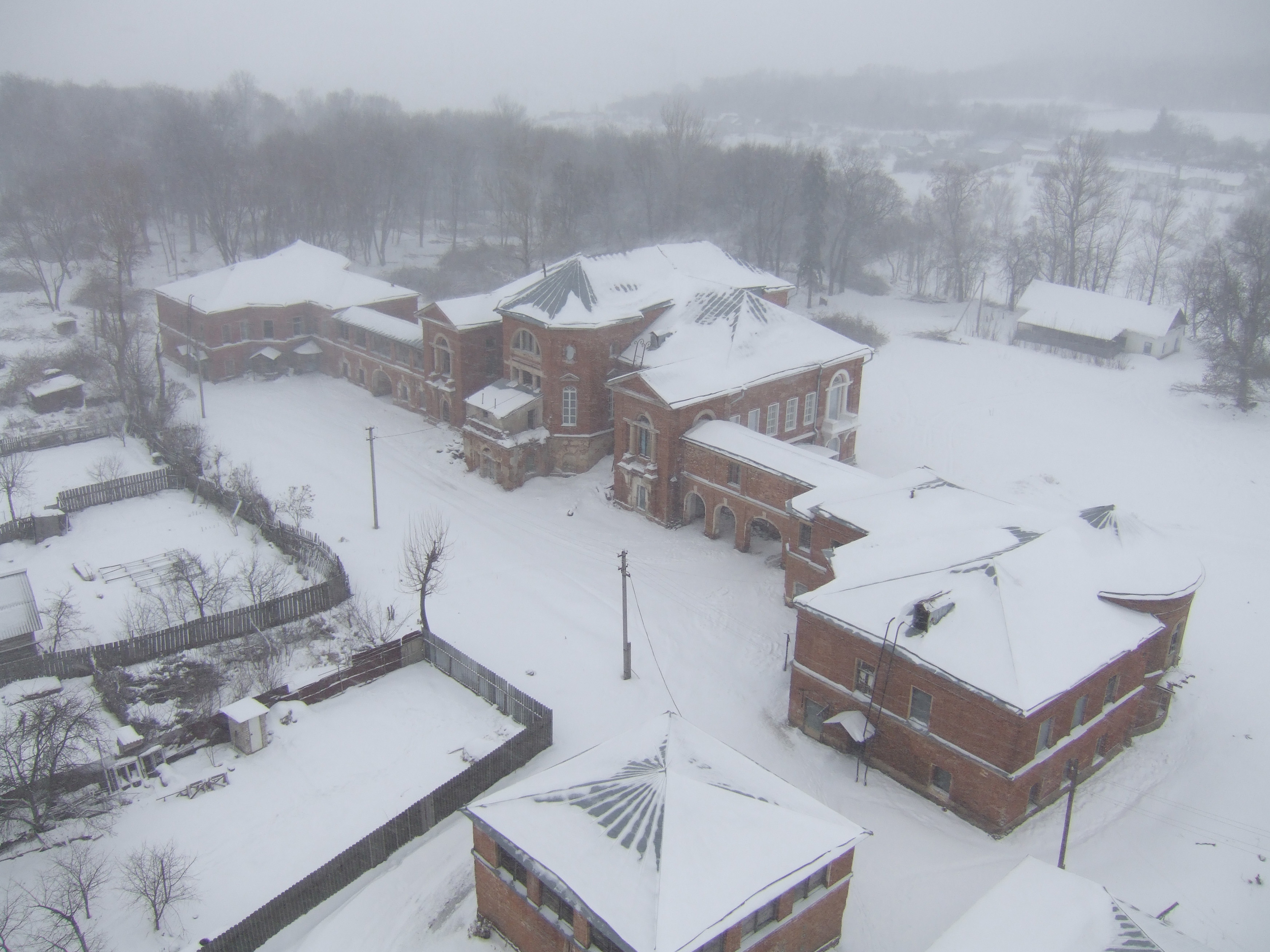
A view of the Nechaev Palace from the Shukhov tower in winter

== Nechaev palace ==
The village was the site of the estate of noble Nechaev family.

The estate is composed of a palace, English park, regular gardens, ponds, and more. The world's first hyperboloid structure by Vladimir Shukhov is located on the grounds of the estate. It was purchased by the then-estate owner Yury Nechaev-Maltsov.
