= Shukhov Tower in Polibino =

Water tower in Polibino, Lipetsk Oblast, Russia

Coordinates: 53°30′00.68″N 38°58′57.38″E

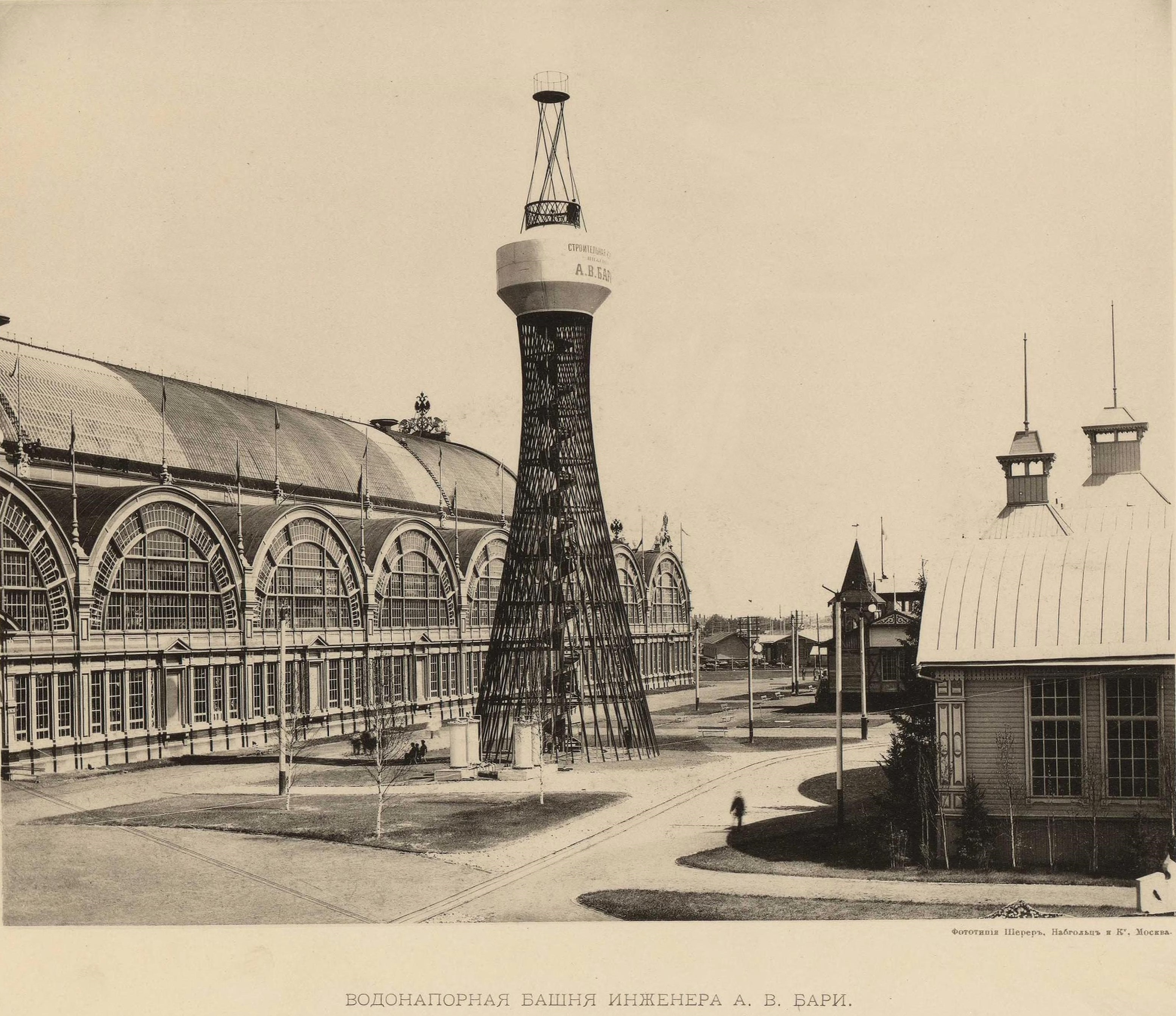
The world's first diagrid hyperboloid 37-meter water tower by Vladimir Shukhov, All-Russian Exposition, Nizhny Novgorod, Russia, 1896

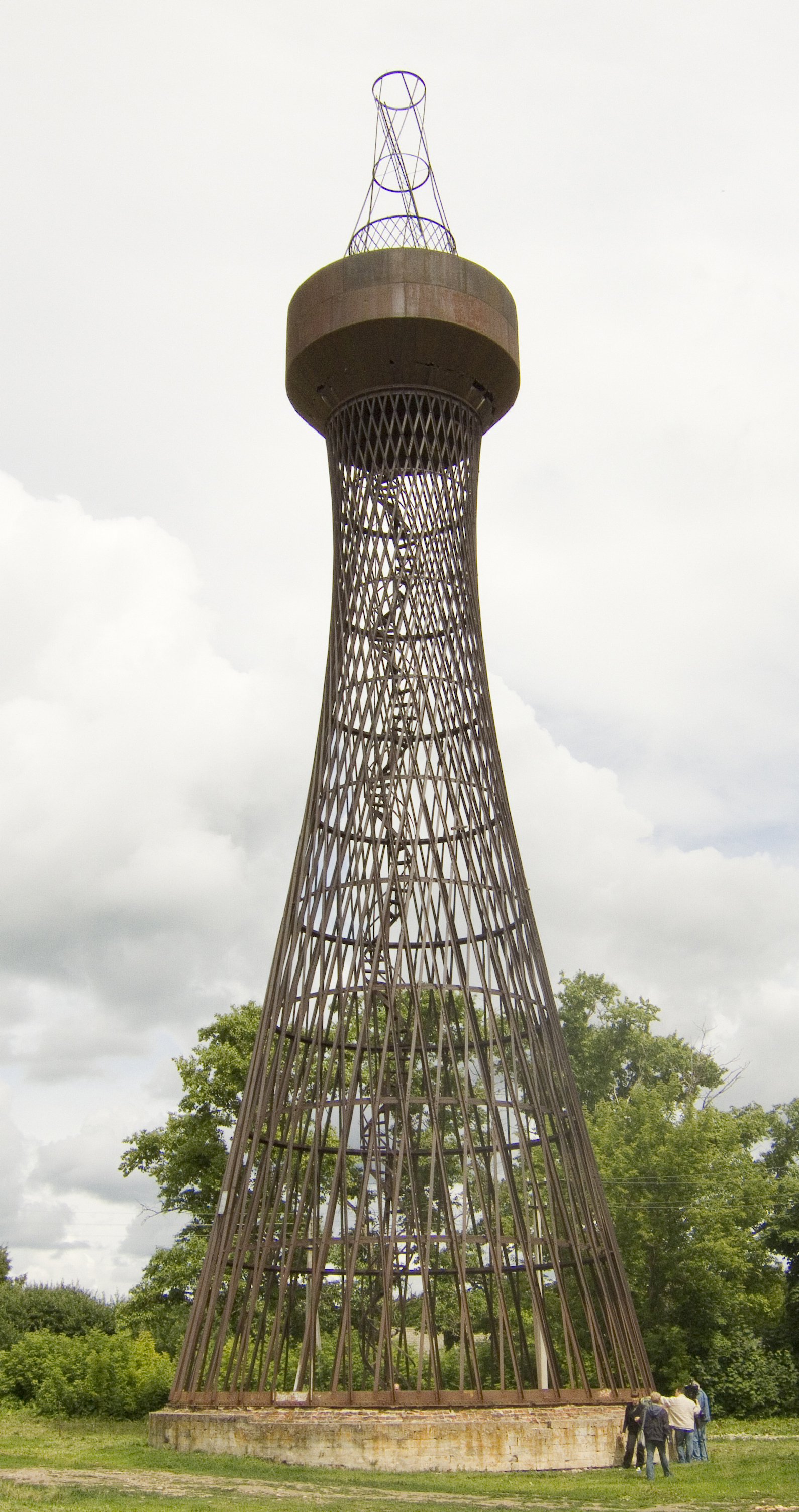
The world's first hyperboloid structure in Polibino, 2009

The Shukhov Tower in Polibino, designed in 1896 by Russian engineer and architect Vladimir Shukhov, is the world's first diagrid hyperboloid structure. The tower is today located in the former estate of Yury Nechaev-Maltsov in the selo of Polibino in Lipetsk Oblast in Russia.

== History ==
Vladimir Shukhov invented hyperboloid towers and was also the first one to use them in construction. For the 1896 All-Russia industrial and art exhibition in Nizhny Novgorod he built the 37-meter (121 ft) steel diagrid tower, which became the first hyperboloid structure in the world. The hyperboloid steel gridshell attracted attention of European observers. In particular, the British magazine The Engineer published an article about the tower.

After the exhibition closed, the openwork tower was bought by a leading glassware manufacturer and art sponsor, Yury Nechaev-Maltsov. It was relocated to his estate in Polibino where it has been preserved until now. The estate is currently under state protection (federal level) as a former property of the Nechayev family. The estate consists of a palace, English park, regular gardens, ponds, and more.

In the subsequent years, Vladimir Shukhov developed numerous structures of various hyperboloid steel gridshells and used them in hundreds of water towers, sea lighthouses, masts of warships and supports for power transmission lines. Similar hyperboloid structures appeared abroad only ten years after Shukhov's invention.

== See also ==
- List of hyperboloid structures

== Photos ==
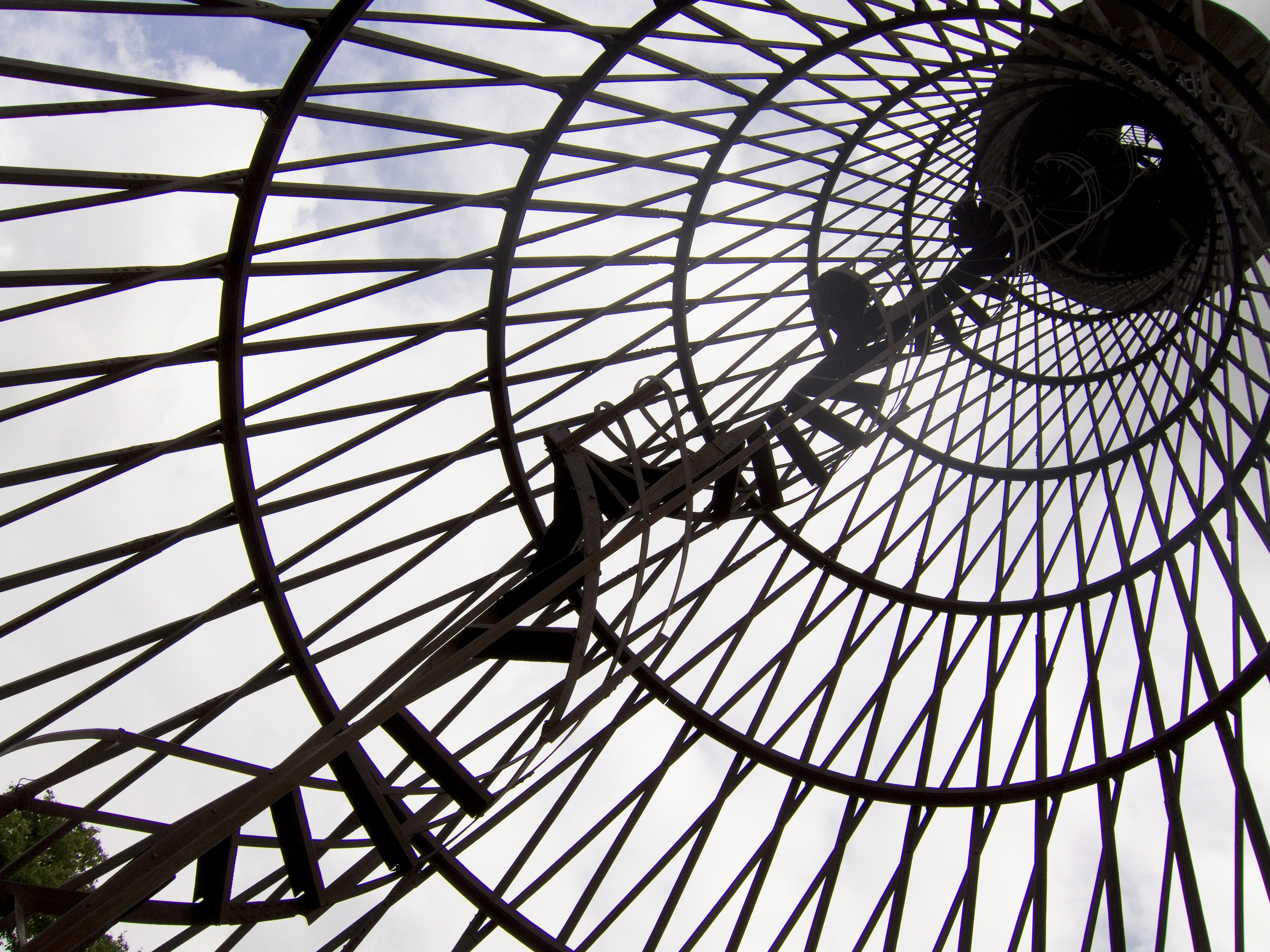

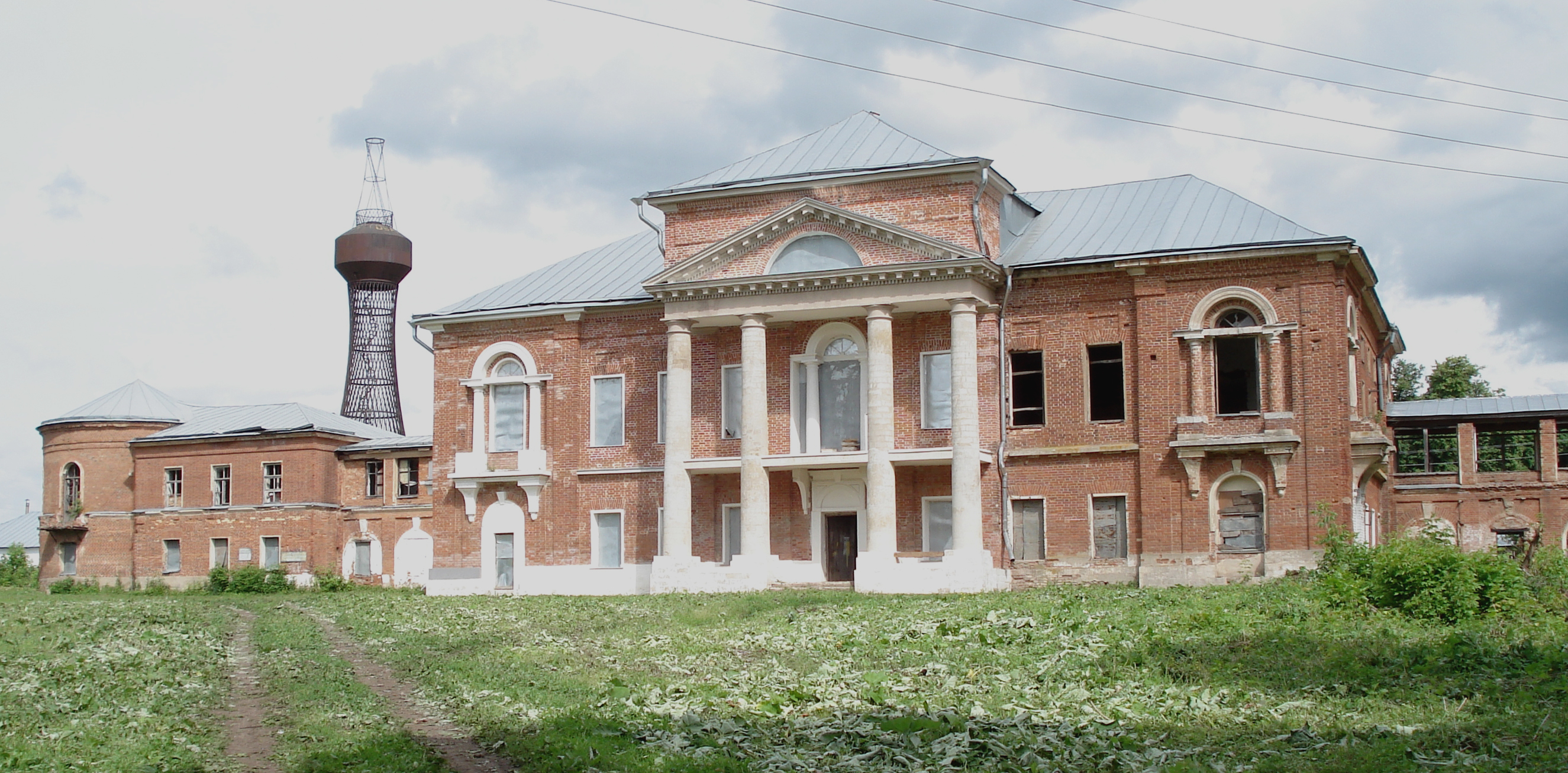

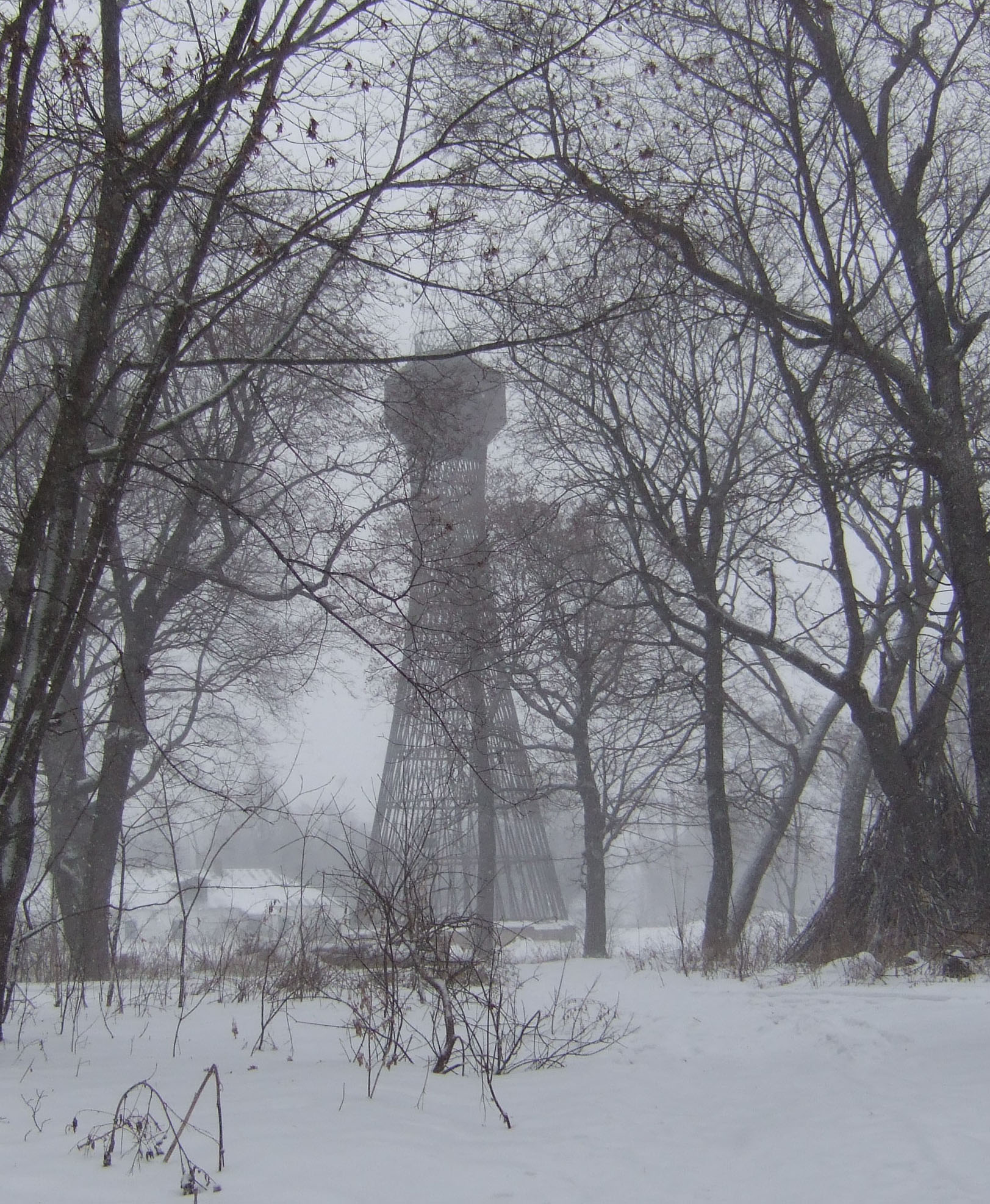

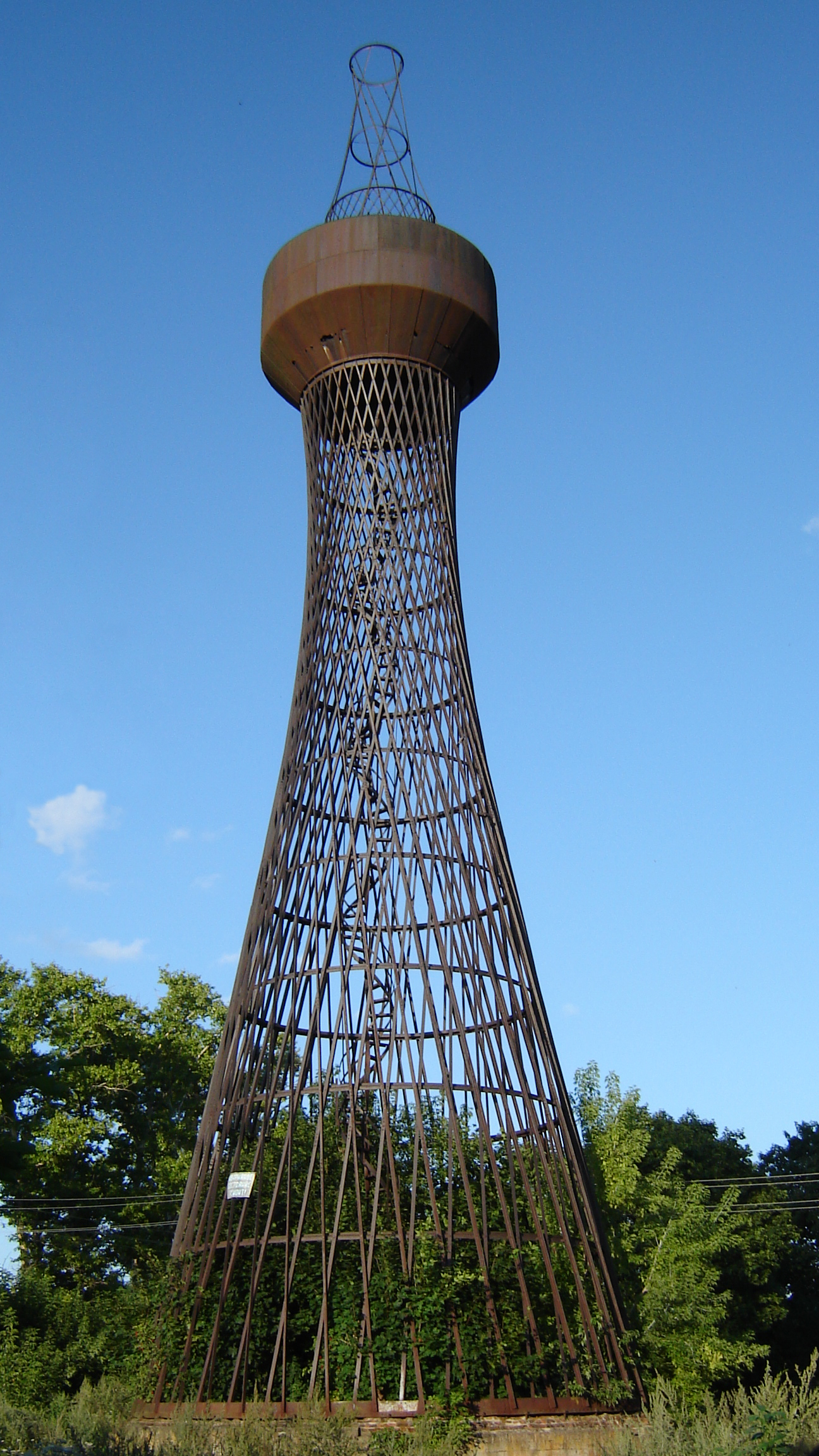
2006

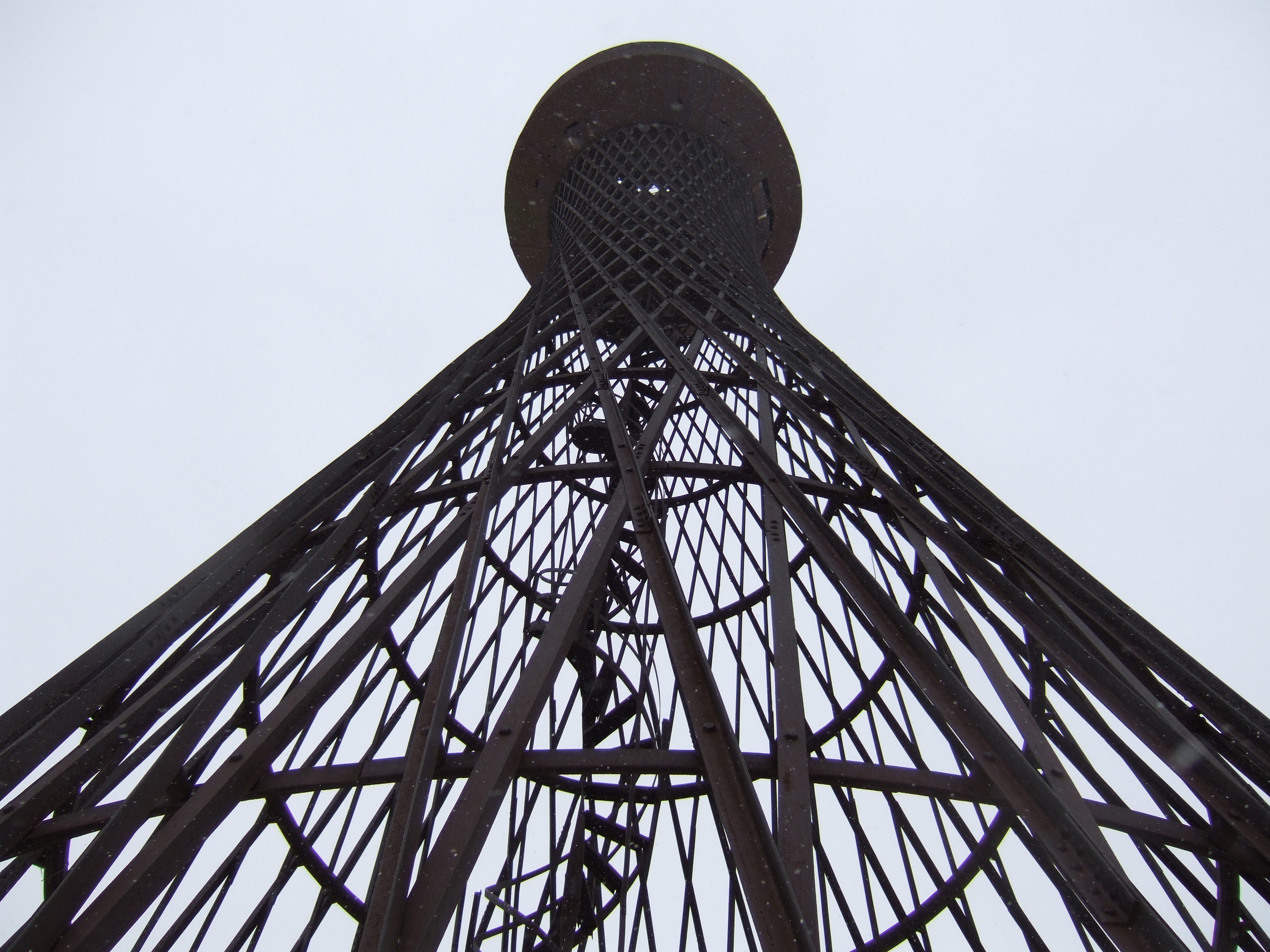
2008

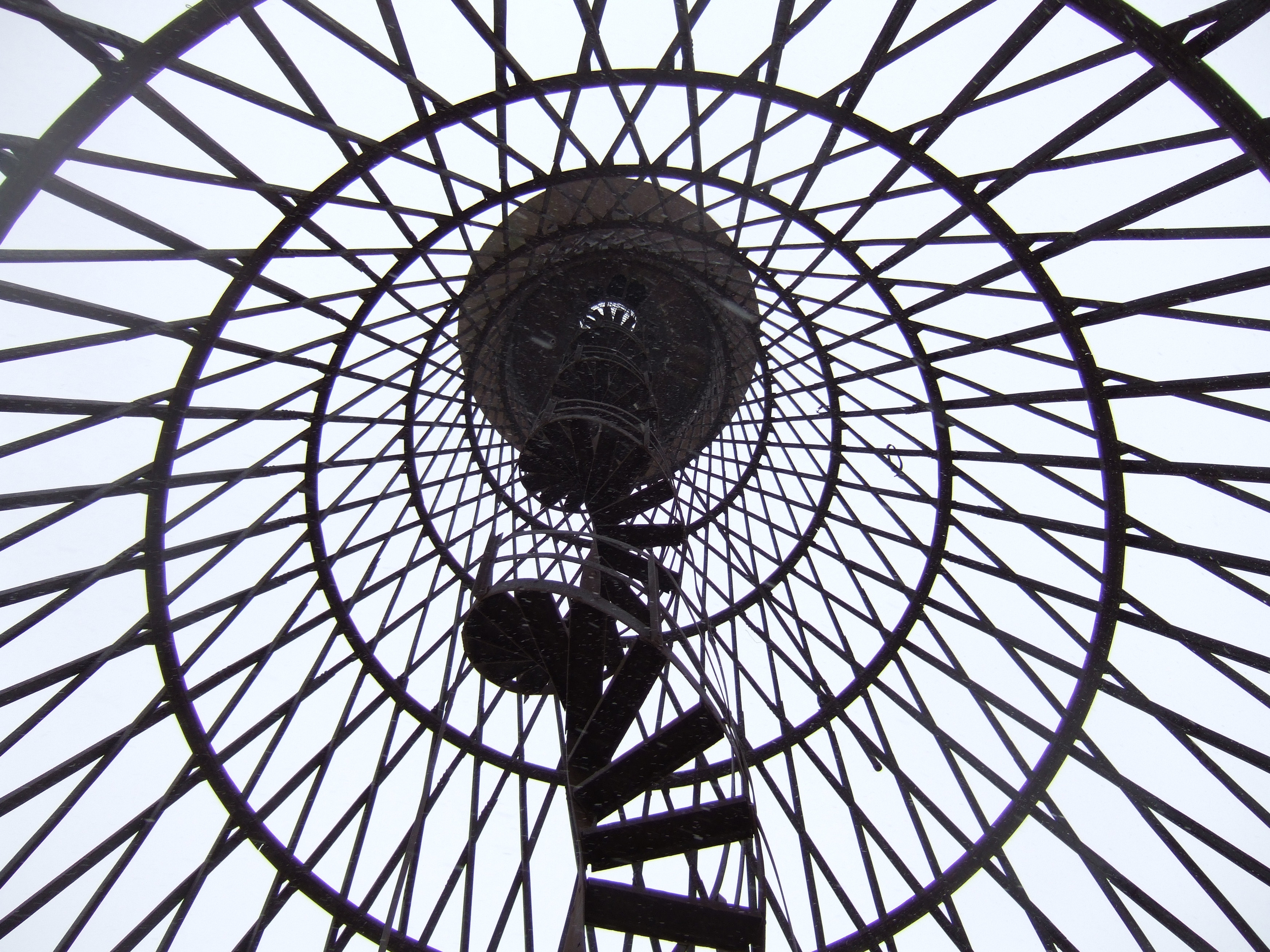
2008

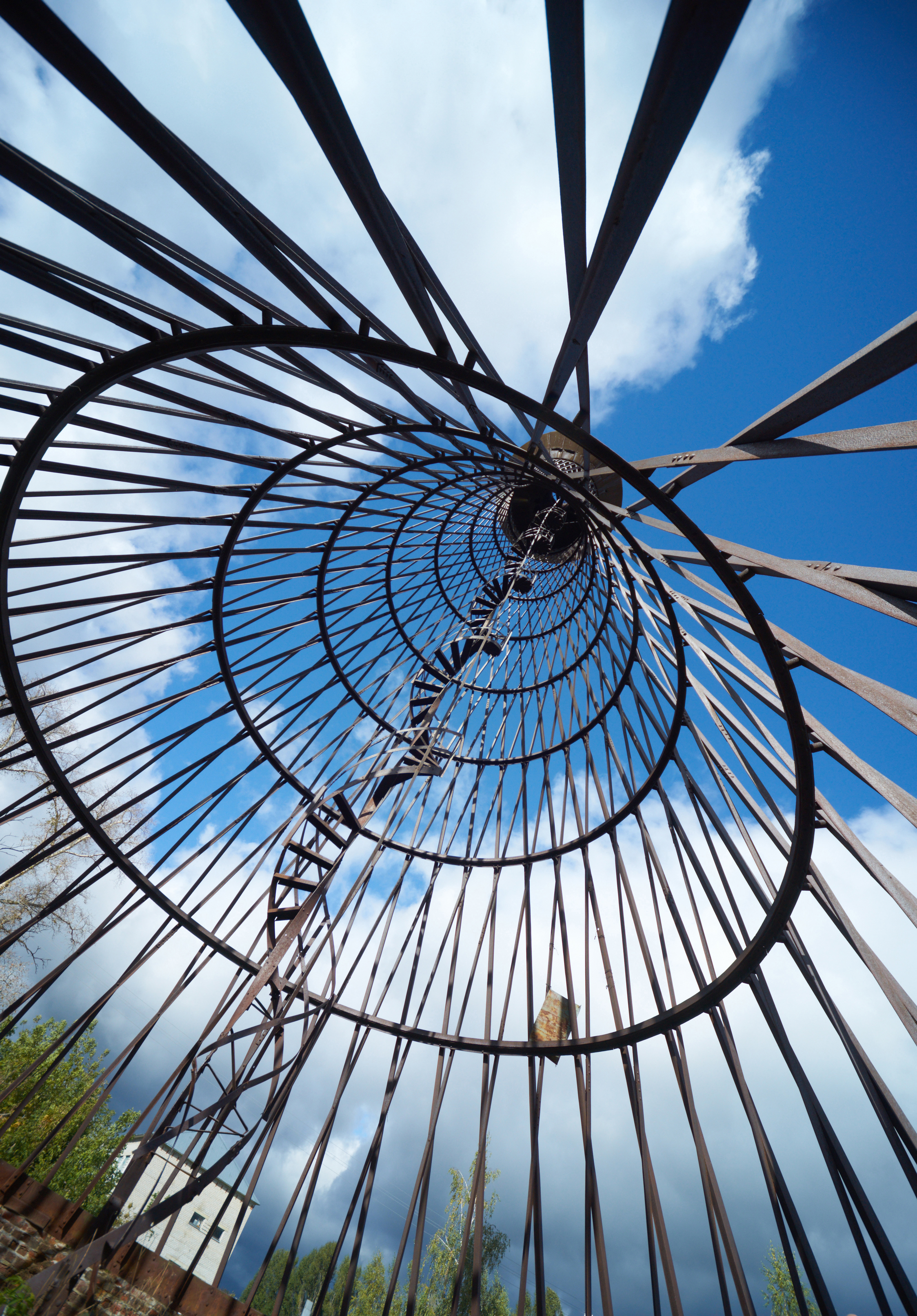
2012
