= Shukhov Tower =

Constructivist broadcasting tower in Moscow, Russia

Coordinates: 55°43′02″N 37°36′41″E

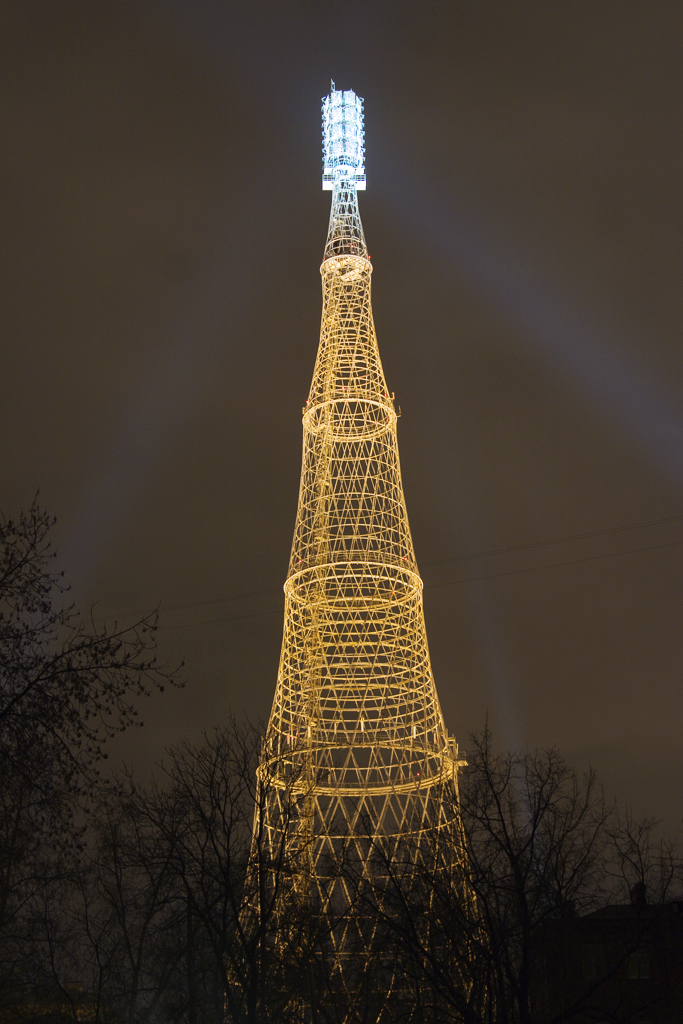
- The tower in 2007

General information
- Architectural style: Constructivist architecture
- Location: Moscow
- Groundbreaking: 1920
- Completed: 1922

Height
- Tip: 160 m (525 ft)

Design and construction
- Architect: Vladimir Shukhov

The Shukhov Radio Tower (Russian: Шуховская башня), also known as the Shabolovka Tower (Шаболовская башня), is a broadcasting tower deriving from the Russian avant-garde in Moscow designed by Vladimir Shukhov. The 160-metre-high (520 ft) free-standing steel diagrid structure was built between 1920 and 1922, during the Russian Civil War.

== History ==
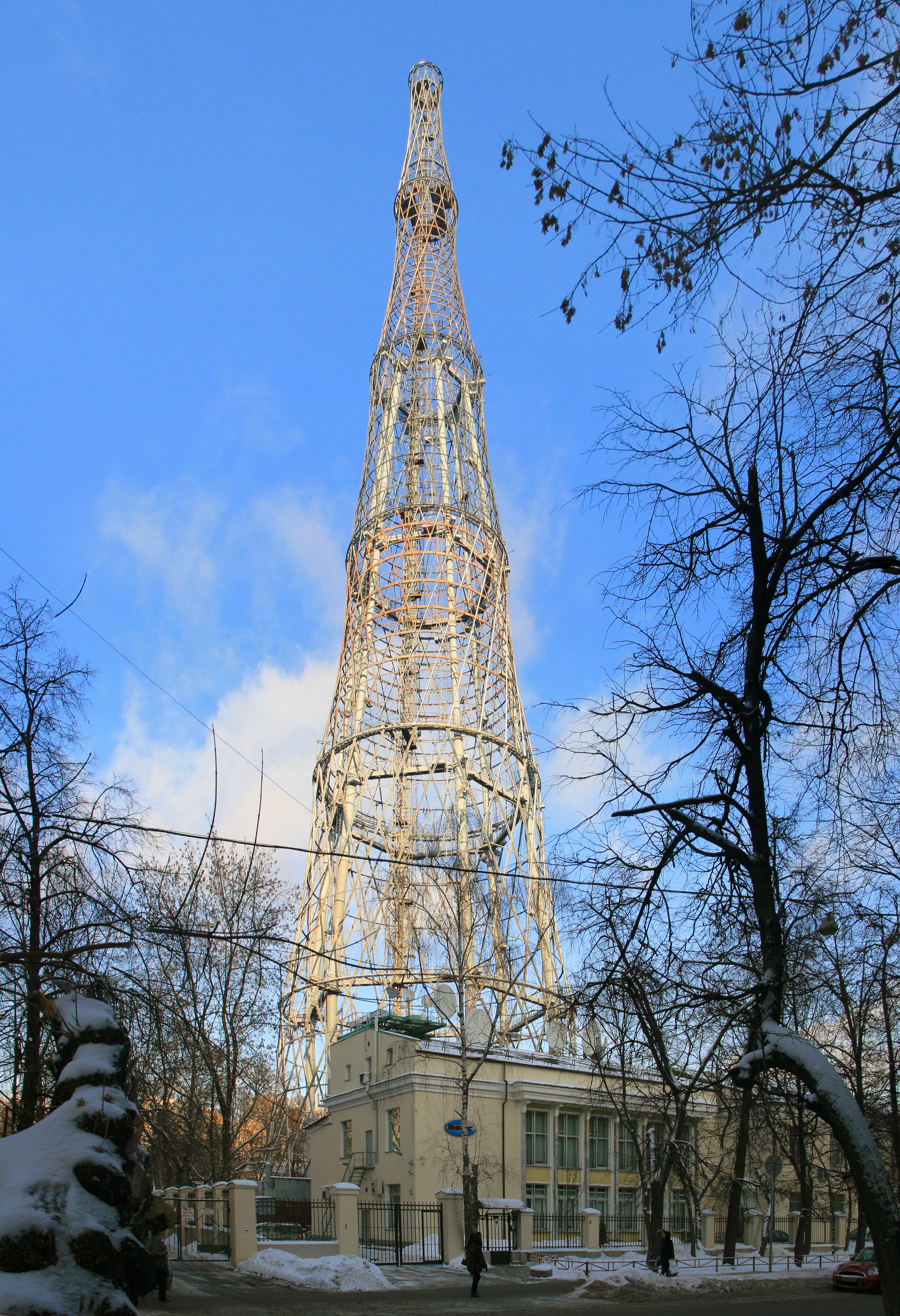
Shabolovka telecentre in December 2016

=== Design ===
Vladimir Shukhov invented the world's first hyperboloid structure in the year 1890. Later he wrote a book, Rafters, in which he proved that the triangular shapes are 20-25% heavier than the arched ones with a ray grating. After that, Shukhov filed a number of patents for a diagrid. He aimed not only to achieve greater strength and rigidity of the structure, but also ease and simplicity through the use of as little building material as possible.

The first diagrid tower was built for the All-Russia Exhibition in Nizhny Novgorod in 1896, and later was bought by Yury Nechaev-Maltsov, a well-known manufacturer in the city. Shukhov was responsible for constructions of a new types of lighthouses, masts, water towers and transmission towers.

The broadcasting tower at Shabolovka is a diagrid structure in the form of a rotated hyperboloid. The Khodynka radio station, built in 1914, could no longer handle the increasing amount of radiograms. On July 30, 1919, Vladimir Lenin signed a decree of the Council of Workers' and Peasants' Defense, which demanded "to install in an extremely urgent manner a radio station equipped with the most advanced and powerful devices and machines", to ensure the security of the country and allow constant communication with other republics. Tower designing was started immediately across many bureaus. Later that year Shukhov's Construction Office won a competition.

The planned height of the new nine-sectioned hyperbolic tower was 350 metres (1,150 ft) (15 metres (49 ft) taller than the Eiffel Tower, which was taken into consideration when creating the plan) with an estimated mass of 2,200 tons (the Eiffel Tower weighs 7,300 tons). However, in the context of the Civil War and the lack of resources, the project had to be revised: the height was reduced to 148.5 metres (487 ft), the weight to 240 tons.

=== Installation ===
Tower construction was carried out without any cranes and scaffolding, but only with winches. The 240 tons of metal was allocated by Lenin’s personal decree from the stocks of the Military Department. For lifting five wooden winches were used, which were moved to the upper sections.

The tower is composed of six sections, one above the other. Each section is an independent hyperboloid based on a larger one.

The sixth section was installed and finally secured on February 14, 1922.

== Structure ==
The Shukhov tower is a hyperboloid structure (hyperbolic steel gridshell) consisting of a series of hyperboloid sections stacked on one another to approximate an overall conical shape. The tower has a diagrid structure, and its steel shell experiences minimum wind load (a significant design factor for high-rising buildings). The tower sections are single-cavity hyperboloids of rotation made of straight beams, the ends of which rest against circular foundations.

== Location ==
The tower is located a few kilometres south of the Moscow Kremlin, but is not accessible to tourists. The street address of the tower is "Shabolovka Street, 37".

== Possible demolition ==
Over its existence, the structure has never undergone a capital renovation. Maintenance painting of the tower ceased in the late 1980s, leading to the onset of corrosion, and all broadcasting operations were terminated in 2002. In 2009, Russian Prime Minister Vladimir Putin approved a Ministry of Communications initiative to begin reconstruction. Although 135 million rubles were allocated by 2011, the funding was deemed insufficient and the public tender was declared void. By that time, expert assessments indicated that the majority of the structure's several thousand joints had been affected by corrosion.

As of early 2014, the tower faced demolition by the Russian State Committee for Television and Radio Broadcasting, after having been allowed to deteriorate for years despite popular calls for its restoration. Following a concerted campaign calling for the preservation of the tower, on July 3 the Ministry of Culture of Russia announced that the tower will not be demolished, and in September 2014 that Moscow City Council had placed a preservation order on the tower in order to safeguard it.

In January 2017 the RTRS placed a request for tender for a plan to renovate and preserve the monument.

In April 2026, Glavgosexpertiza of Russia issued a positive conclusion for a project dedicated to the "preservation" of the radio tower. According to the agency, the approved project entails the dismantling and replacement of several sections, along with various other structural elements, to ensure the long-term stability of the historic site.

== Models ==
There is a model of Shukhov's Shabolovka Tower at the Information Age gallery at the Science Museum in London. The model is at 1:30 scale and was installed in October 2014.

== In popular culture ==
- In 1922 one of the members of ASNOVA Vladimir Krinsky made a "Radio speaker of the Revolution" mural with a picture of a tower.
- A science fiction novel by Aleksey Nikolayevich Tolstoy, The Garin Death Ray, was inspired by the public reaction towards construction of the tower.
- Shukhov Tower was a logo of a "L'art de l'ingénieur" exhibition in Centre Georges-Pompidou.
- In the novel A Gentleman in Moscow by Amor Towles, set in 1922, the character Mikhail Fyodorovich Mindich declares the Shukhov tower a thing of beauty, "a five hundred foot structure of spiraling steel from which we can broadcast the latest news and intelligence - and, yes, the sentimental strains of your Tchaikovsky ..." (Windmill Books, p.85)

== Gallery ==
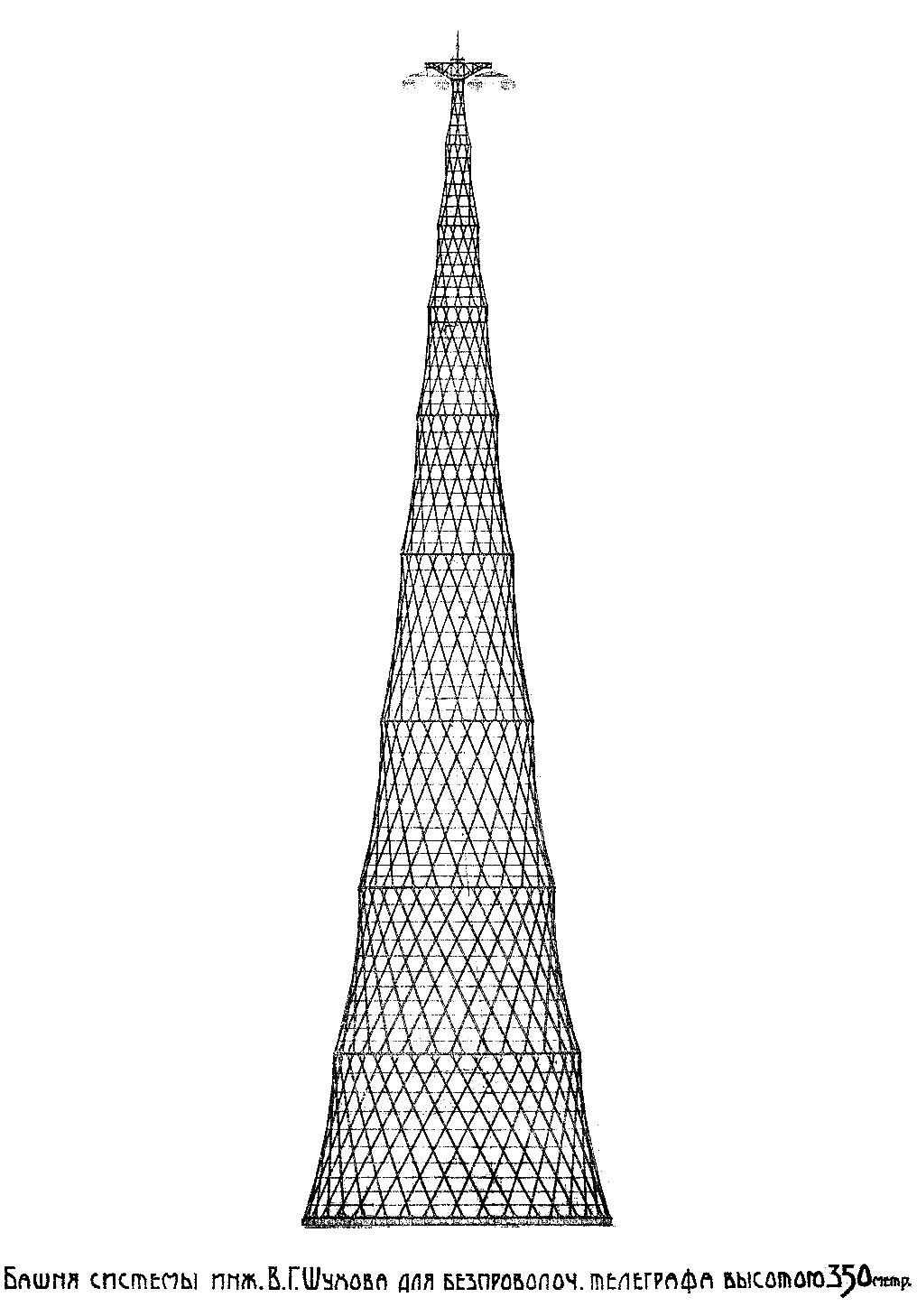
Shukhov Tower Project of 350 metres, 1919.

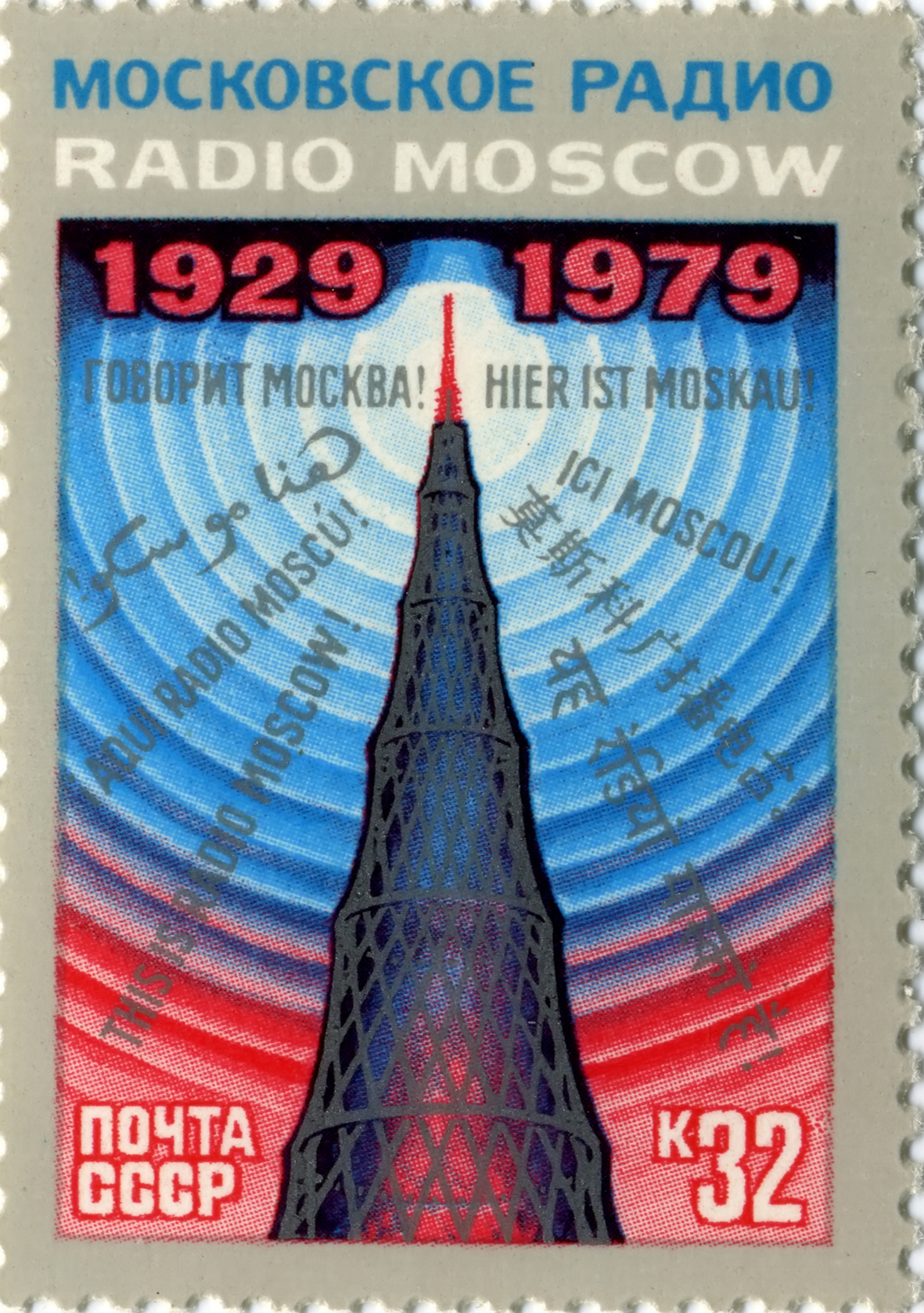
1979

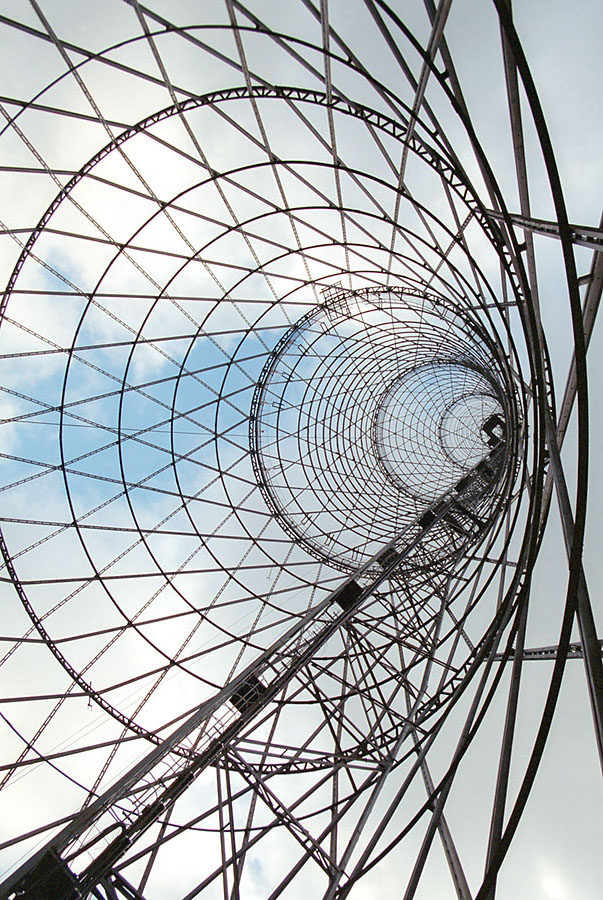
2006

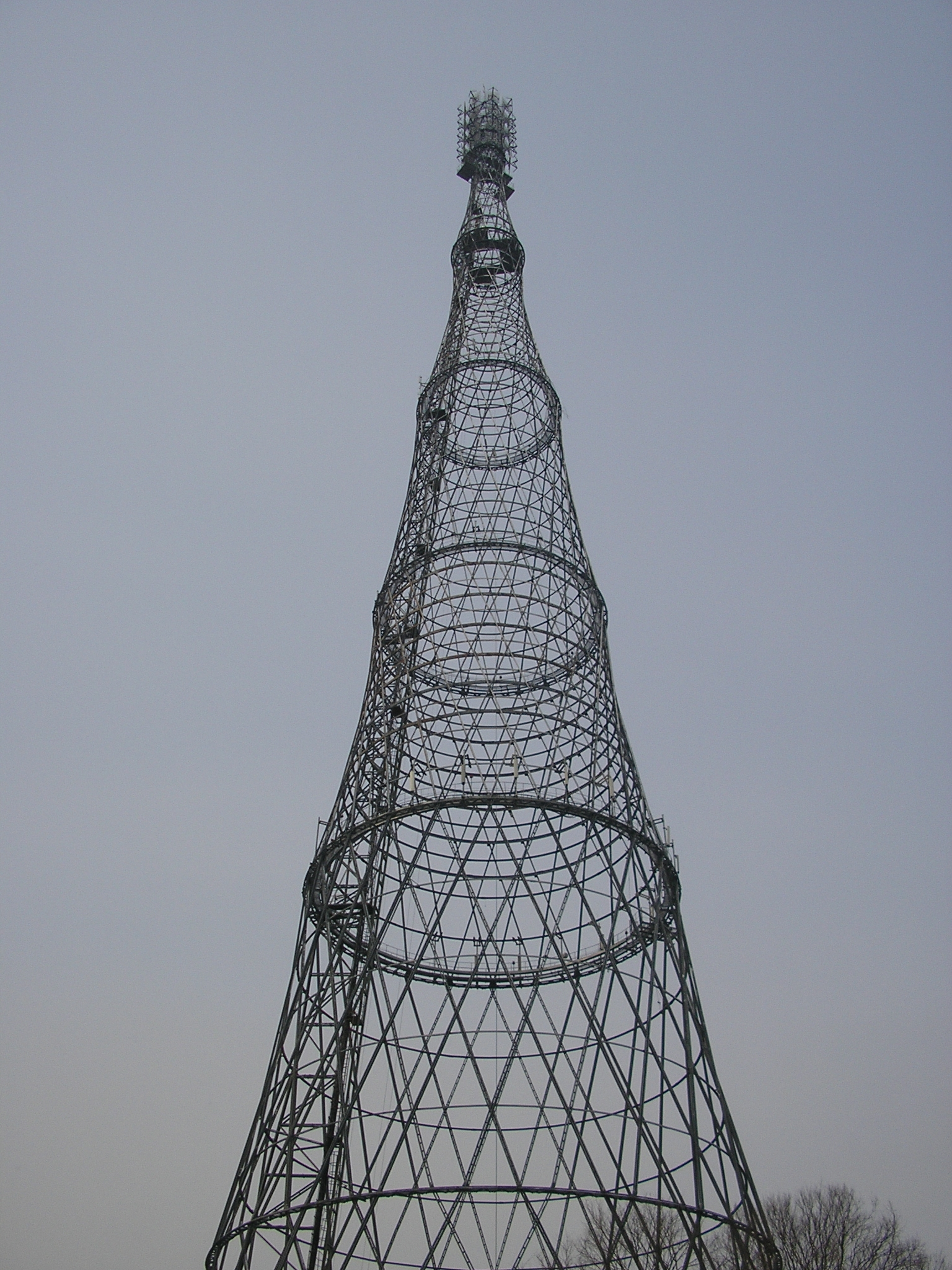
2006

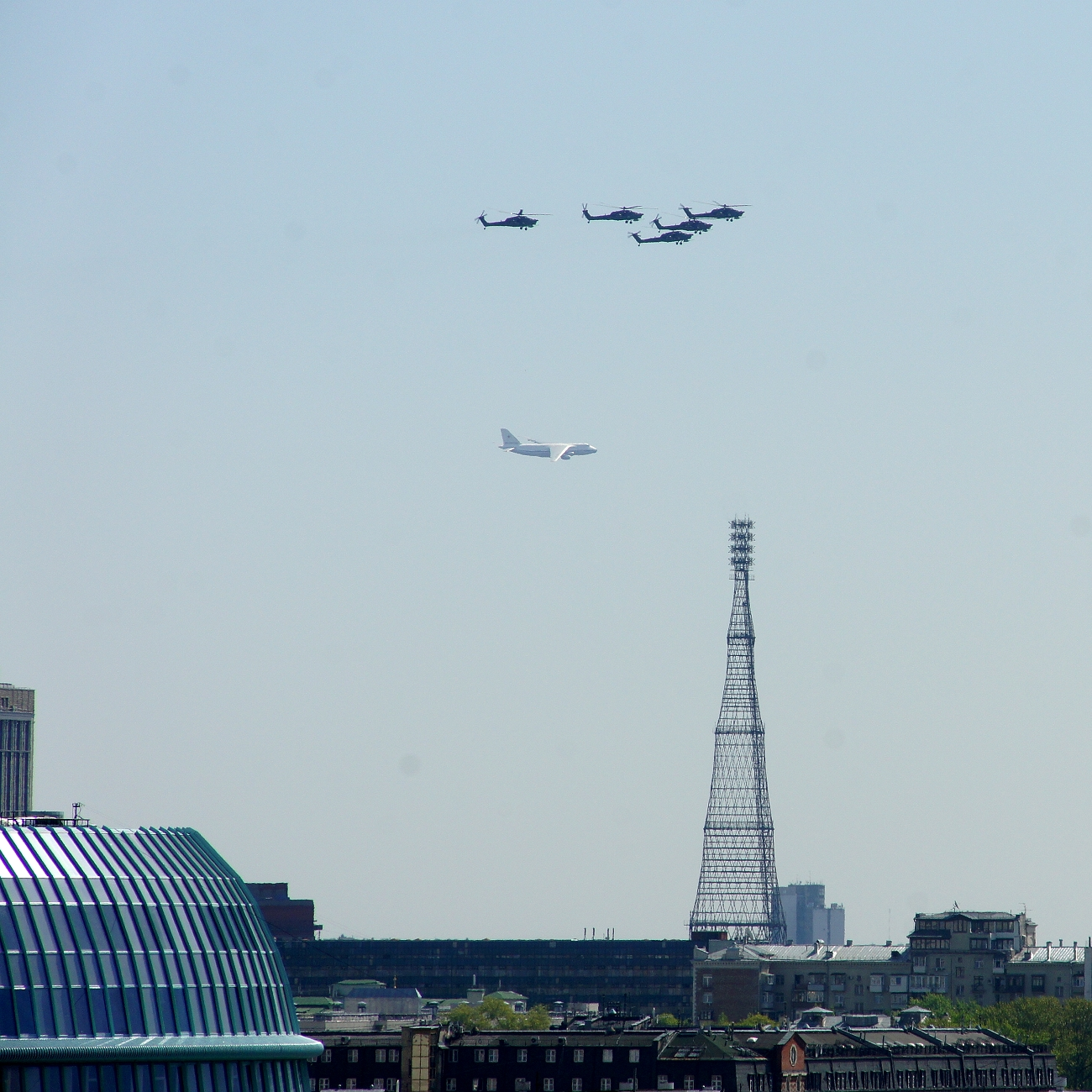
2015

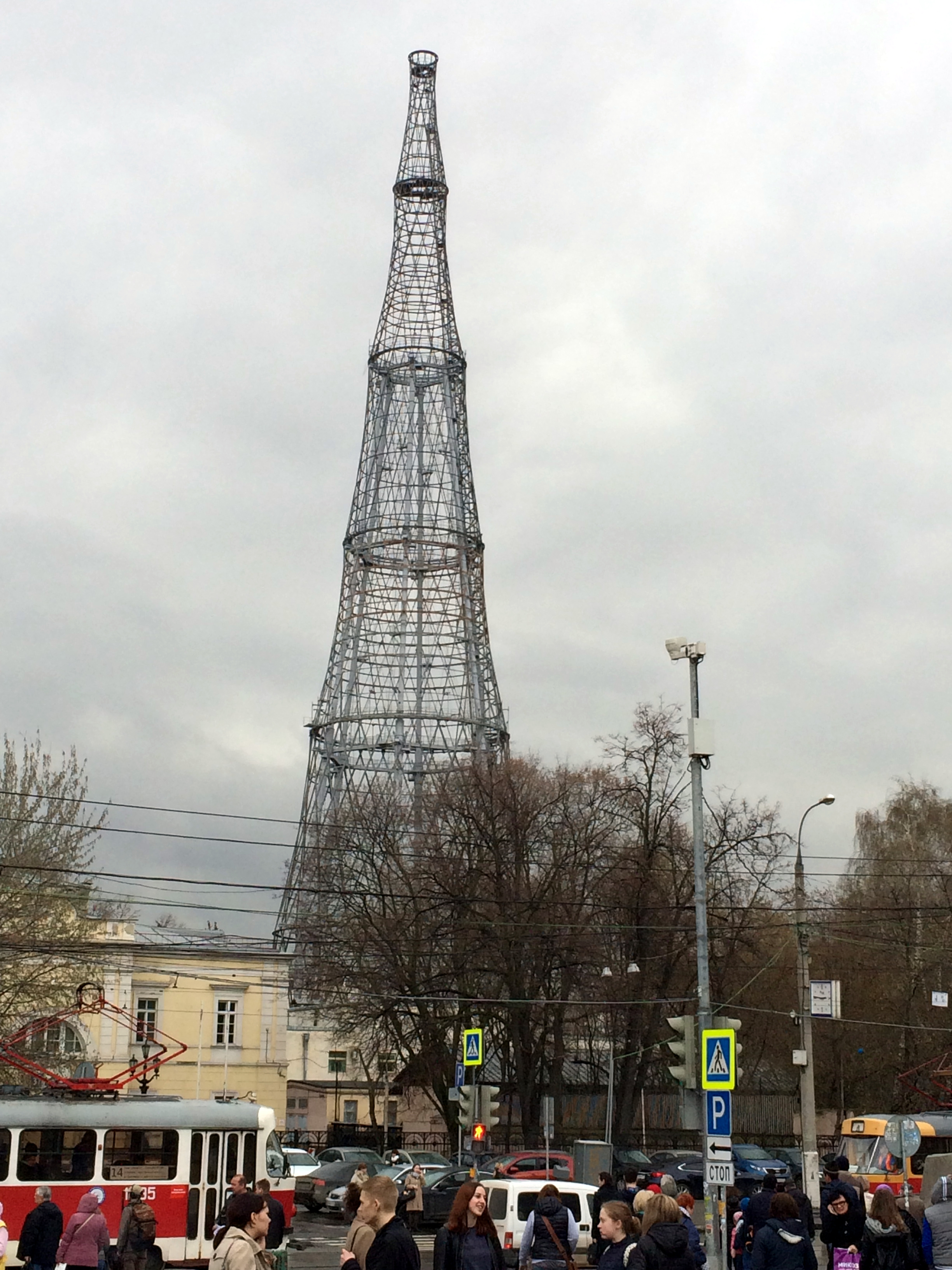
2016

== See also ==
- Constructivist architecture
- Lattice tower
- List of hyperboloid structures
- Shukhov tower on the Oka River

== Literature ==
- P.Gössel, G.Leuthäuser, E.Schickler; "Architecture in the 20th century"; Taschen Verlag; 1990; ISBN 3-8228-4123-4.
- Elizabeth C. English, “Arkhitektura i mnimosti”: The origins of Soviet avant-garde rationalist architecture in the Russian mystical-philosophical and mathematical intellectual tradition”, a dissertation in architecture, 264 p., University of Pennsylvania, 2000.

(in German)

- “Vladimir G. Suchov 1853–1939. Die Kunst der sparsamen Konstruktion.”, Rainer Graefe und andere, 192 S., Deutsche Verlags-Anstalt, Stuttgart, 1990, ISBN 3-421-02984-9.
- Jesberg, Paulgerd Die Geschichte der Bauingenieurkunst, Deutsche Verlags-Anstalt, Stuttgart (Germany), ISBN 3-421-03078-2, 1996; pp. 198–9.
- Ricken, Herbert Der Bauingenieur, Verlag für Bauwesen, Berlin (Germany), ISBN 3-345-00266-3, 1994; pp. 230.

(in French)

- Picon, Antoine (dir.), "L'art de l'ingenieur : constructeur, entrepreneur, inventeur", Éditions du Centre Georges Pompidou, Paris, 1997, ISBN 2-85850-911-5
- Fausto Giovannardi "Vladimir Shukhov e la leggerezza dell'acciaio" at giovannardierontini.it
