= Allen Warren =

Australian rules footballer

Personal information
- Full name: Allen Warren
- Born: 2 May 1931
- Died: 6 September 1974 (aged 43)
- Original team: East Geelong
- Height: 178 cm (5 ft 10 in)
- Weight: 76 kg (168 lb)

Playing career^{1}
Years	Club	Games (Goals)
1953–1955	Footscray	28 (2)
- ^{1} Playing statistics correct to the end of 1955.

Allen Warren (2 May 1931 – 6 September 1974) was an Australian rules footballer who played for the Footscray Football Club in the Victorian Football League (VFL).
