= Alan R. Warren =

Canadian radio host and author

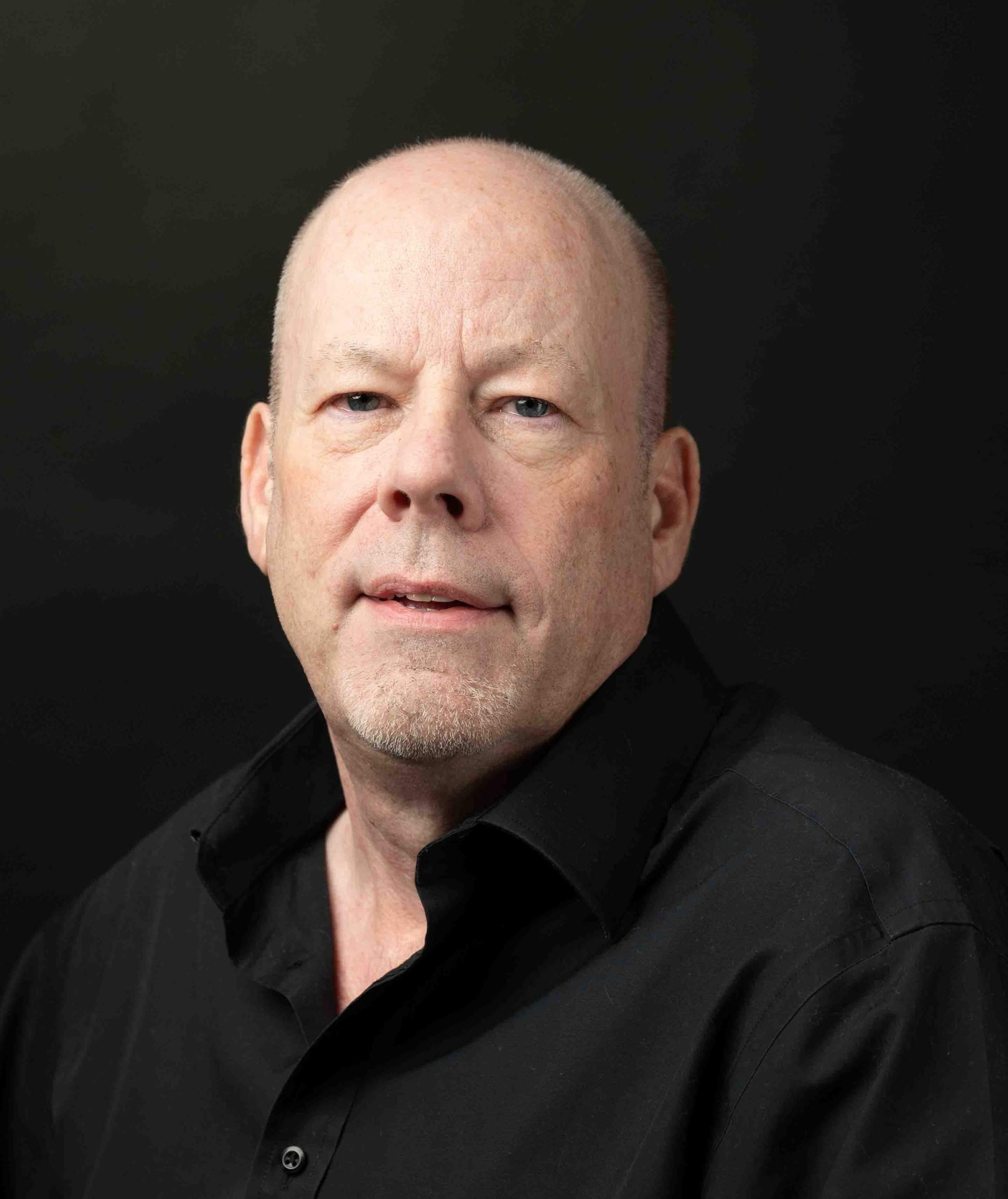
- Born: New Westminster, B.C., Canada
- Citizenship: Canadian
- Occupations: Radio host, author
- Website: alanrwarren.com

Alan R. Warren is a Canadian radio host and author known for his work in true crime and mystery genres.

== Career ==
Warren began hosting House of Mystery in 2013, originally airing on KFNX 1100 AM in Phoenix. The show was later syndicated on KKNW 1150 AM in Seattle/Tacoma and is currently broadcast through NBC News Radio affiliate KCAA in California (106.5 FM Los Angeles, 102.3 FM Riverside, 1050 AM Palm Springs, and 540 AM Salt Lake City). His show discusses fiction and nonfiction topics, including true crime, historical events, paranormal phenomena, and popular culture. Warren has hosted guests, including Marcia Clark, Robert F. Kennedy Jr., Nancy Grace, Aphrodite Jones, Tom Mesereau, Lee Goldberg, Gregory Ashe, and Lev Raphael. In 2020, the program expanded into a spin-off titled The House of Mystery Fiction.

Warren began his writing career contributing to True Crime Case Files and Serial Killer Magazine. His first book, Above Suspicion, which chronicles the case of Canadian serial killer Russell Williams, was published by RJ Parker Publishing and became a bestseller. He has collaborated with other authors, including true crime historian Peter Vronsky.

He has also participated in media adaptations of his work, including a documentary based on Doomsday Cults recorded for Vice and an episode of Very Scary People based on The Killing Game. His book The Killing Game was adapted into an episode of Murder Made Me Famous on Reelz, and also featured in Mark of a Killer on the Oxygen Network.

== Selected publications ==
- Above Suspicion: The True Story of Russell Williams (2020)
- The Killing Game: The True Story of Rodney Alcala (2017, 2018)
- Blood Thirst: The True Story of Wayne Boden (2020)
- Deadly Betrayal: The True Story of Jennifer Pan (2020)
- The Grindr Serial Killer: The True Story of Stephen Port (2020)
- Doomsday Cults: The Devil's Hostages (2020)
- Confession of Murder (2020)
- Jack the Ripper: The Interviews (2020)
- Murder Times Six: The True Story of the Wells Gray Park Murders (2020)
