= Shabolovka Street =

Street in Moscow, Russia

Coordinates: 55°43′10″N 37°36′33″E

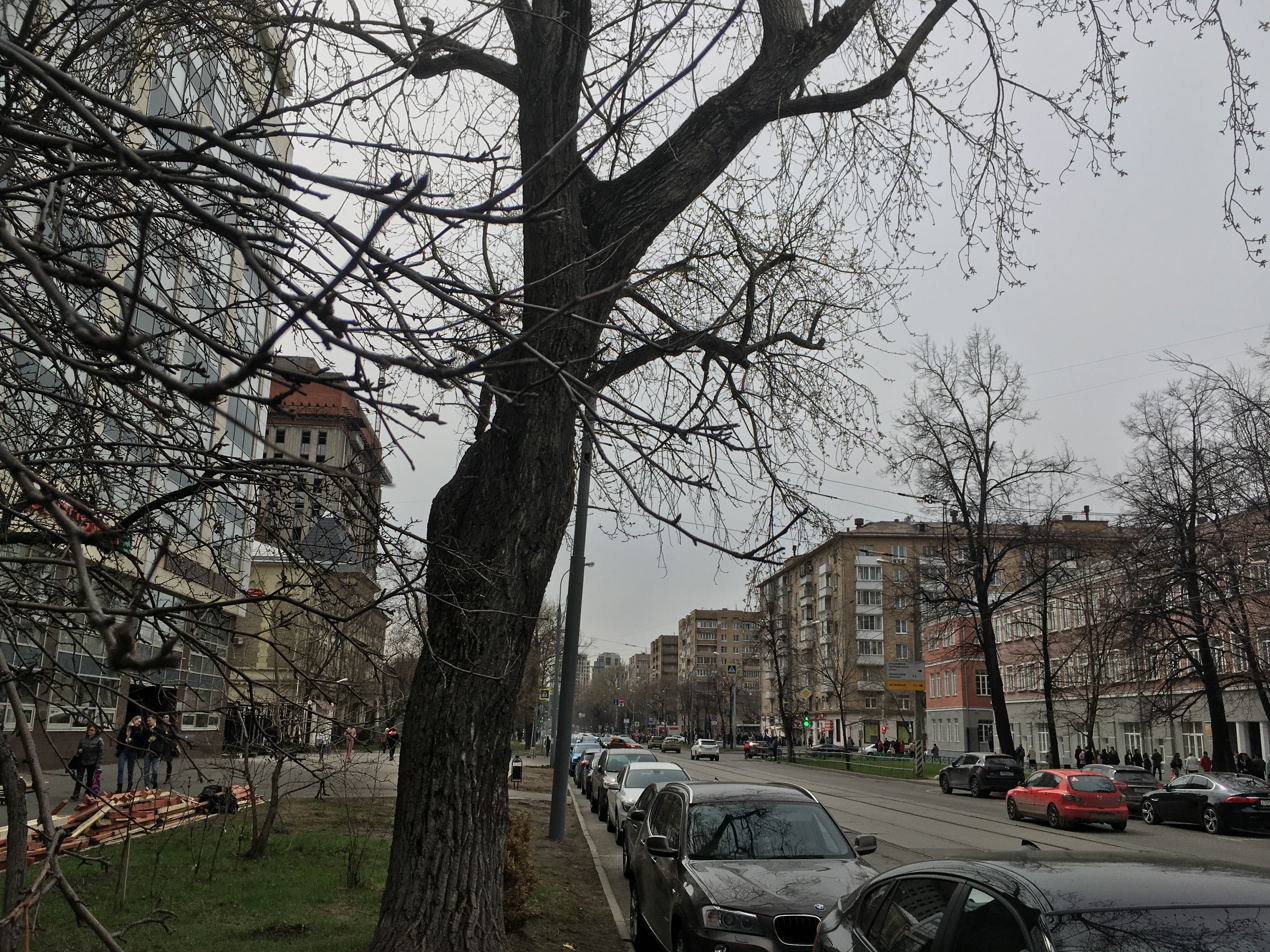
Shabolovka Street in April 2019

Shabolovka (Russian: Ша́боловка) is a street in the south of Moscow's city centre (located in Yakimanka, Donskoy, and Danilovsky districts), known since the middle of the 18th century. Notable features on the street included the Shukhov Tower (designed by Vladimir Shukhov in 1919, and built between 1920 and 1922), and the attached Broadcasting Centre in dom 37.

Shabolovka Street runs from Kaluzhky Square, stretching from Leninsky Prospekt (until 1957 named Kaluzhskaya Street) to Mytny Ulitsta, and finishing at the crossroads Supukhovsky Val.

== Origins of the street ==
Unlike many of the other surrounding streets, Shabolovka was never decreed as a main street. The street originally fared as a connecting road to the Southern Village of Shabolovo which is nowadays within modern Cheryomushki District. Houses along the road to Shabolovo appeared only in the late 17th century. In the built-up parts areas at the end of the road, Trinity Church was constructed. It was wooden framed, and in 1707 it is documented as having been rebuilt, most likely due to the outset of a fire. On the official map of Moscow, in 1739 Shabolovka already laid claim to buildings in the likes of the Donskoy Monastery. Not far from there sprouted the side streets of: - Rizpolozhensky Pereulok, currently renamed Akademia Petrovskogo street in the west, and to the east - Sirotsky Pereulok street now named Shukhov street.

== History of Shabolovka ==
As of 1744 the land east of Shabolovka on the even numbered side of the street belonged to the Danilov Monastery and all residents paid rent for ownership and partly paid for new constructions. On the odd side of the street stood Trinity Church along with her cemetery. The Donskoy Monastery was located on the even side. At the beginning of the street in 1744 on the odd side of the street Butcher Row was constructed, as well as numerous households of the General of Police F. V. Naumov, along 188 meters on the street Naumov erected wooden fencing outlining his property. In the modern day area surrounding Konny Pereulok crossing from Khavskoy street, to Mytnaya street was set out for a "Livestock Market".

By 1793 there were 37 homesteads on the street, all constructed in wood, with one two floors with large gardens and orchards, a typical layout for a street of the era.

By 1812 Shabolovka was considered the street right up to Serpukhov shaft (part of the Chambers-collegiate shaft), but most of it accounted for gardens, especially on the even west side, which ended up preventing a destructive fire causing too much damage in 1812 owing to the sparsity of the layout.

By 1826 of the 37 Homesteads six belonged to the middle classes, one belonged to the wood craftsman, and in house 13 was located the local police station.

By 1854 the street contained 48 homesteads, all still with extensive gardens, with odd numbered side being built up only to Khavsko-Shabolovskaya Pereulok (now part of Lesteva Street). One huge yard with a garden belonged at the time Varvarinskoye orphanage (in honour of the martyr Varvara Yakovleva). The lane near the house was first named Varvarinskoye, then Sirotsky (current name Shukhov). Now it is occupied by television centre in a converted church building Martyr Varvara is a children's editorial Russian television company.

By the end of the 19th century Shabolovka changed significantly. Instead of the previous wooden structures, homes were now built of stone with three or four floors with surrounding palisade and green facades.

In 1882, in Shabolovka claimed 72 homesteads and house number 17 became the local brewery. The gardens are still around the Donskoy Monastery, retaining their suburban feel. In the revolution of 1905 major events occurred in the northern part of the street. The factory workers of the mechanical plant Schwarzkopf was in the house 45 rose up in protest. Shabolovka and Konny Pereulok were blocked by barricades, lasting longer than any previous protests and affected the tranquil of Shabolovka.

In 1906, the Nechaevsky Almshouse was opened (Building 33), built with funds by Y.S Nechaev-Maltsov. The architect was Roman Klein a famous and highly regarded Russian architect with his origins in a family of German merchant traders. In the basement of the house in 1916 was placed in a 1907 printing of the Moscow district organisation RSDLP (РСДРП) Communist party of the Soviet Union.

By 1914, the brewery Karneev and Gorshanova split up into four buildings (houses 19, 21, 25 and 31, now the property of the company Udarnitsa). In the place of house number seven rose the "Moscow Tramway Depot" the architect again Vladimir Shukhov. The street was paved with cobblestones and by night kerosene lanterns burned to light the way. Activity on this street was small, and the street appeared like a distant suburb of Moscow.

In 1917, during the events of the October Revolution the workers of the tramway aided in taking away wounded from the barricades and the dispatch of weapons and products. The tramway was subsequently renamed "The first Moscow Tramway in the name of Apakov" in honour of the leader of the Workers Peter Apakov

== Telecentre and Shukhov Tower ==
Tower and hangar for the Antenna Radio Comintern was built in the courtyard of the house 51 (the numbering of houses was changed later) on the orders of Lenin in 1922. Next in 1958, another similar tower was built in a similar openwork design, but lower in height but it was subsequently demolished.

From the very beginning of television broadcasting in Moscow television viewers remember this address: 113162, Moscow, Shabolovka 37. After the construction of Ostankino television center in on Shabolovka there were editorial television networks, particularly for child entertainment, sports, literary and dramas.

Shukhov tower preserves the function of the transmitting center until 1995 for residents of nearby homes Shabolovka had to lay cable television, as they fell into the "radioshadow" transmitting antennas.
