= Yury Nechaev-Maltsov =

Russian glassware manufacturer

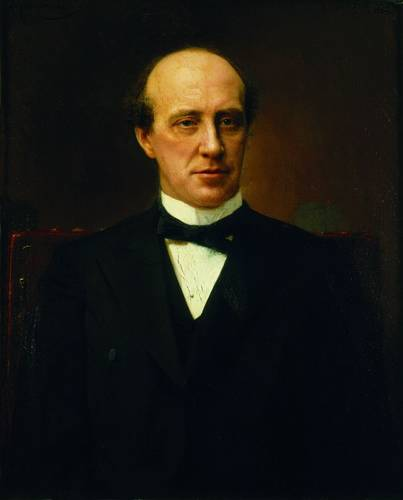
A portrait by Ivan Kramskoy.

Yury Stepanovich Nechaev-Maltsov (Russian: Юрий Степанович Нечаев-Мальцов; 1834–1913) was a leading glassware manufacturer of the Russian Empire. He is remembered as the most important private donor to the Pushkin Museum (then "Alexander III Museum") who made its foundation possible.

Yury was the second son of Stepan Nechayev and Sofia Maltsova, the sister and heiress of Ivan Maltsov, the most important glass manufacturer in the Russian Empire. Yury inherited his uncle's wealth and surname. He owned a number of shops in Moscow and St. Petersburg where the glassware produced by his factories in Gus-Khrustalny was sold. Russia's biggest fairs were supplied with his glass products.
