= Shukhov =

Shukhov refers to:

- Boris Shukhov (*8 May 1947), a retired Soviet cyclist
- Vladimir Shukhov (1853–1939), a Russian engineer-polymath, scientist and architect.

Various structures in Russia and an industrial process bear his name: Structures:

- Shukhov Tower, Moscow
- Shukhov Rotunda
- Shukhov tower on the Oka River, Nizhny Novgorod

Industrial process:

- Shukhov cracking process
