= William Merriam Burton =

American chemist

- Born: November 17, 1865; Cleveland, Ohio
- Died: December 29, 1954 (aged 89); Miami, Florida
- Awards: Willard Gibbs Award (1918); Perkin Medal (1922)
- Scientific career
- Fields: Chemistry
- Workplaces: Standard Oil

William Merriam Burton (November 17, 1865 – December 29, 1954) was an American chemist who developed the widely used Burton process of thermal cracking for crude oil.

Burton was born in Cleveland, Ohio. In 1886, he received a Bachelor of Science degree at Western Reserve University. He earned a PhD at Johns Hopkins University in 1889.

Burton initially worked for the Standard Oil refinery at Whiting, Indiana. He became president of Standard Oil from 1918 to 1927, when he retired.

The process of thermal cracking invented by Burton, which became U.S. patent 1,049,667 on January 7, 1913, doubled the yield of gasoline that can be extracted from crude oil.

The first thermal cracking method, the Shukhov cracking process, was invented by Russian engineer Vladimir Shukhov (1853–1939), in the Russian empire, Patent No. 12926, November 27, 1891.

Burton died in Miami, Florida.
