= All-Russia Exhibition =

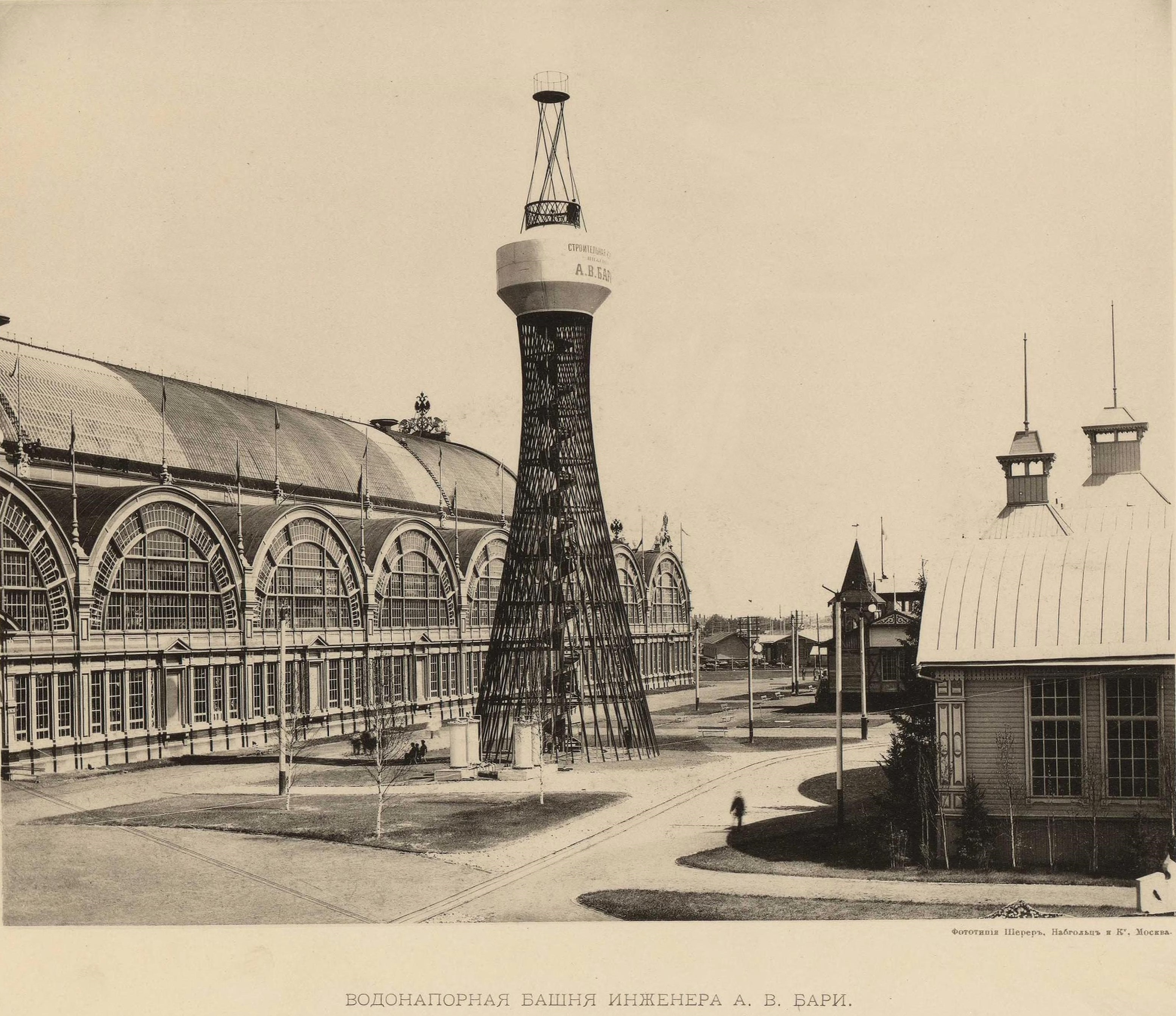
Hyperboloid structure by Vladimir Shukhov, All-Russia Exhibition in Nizhny Novgorod, 1896

The All-Russia Industrial and Art Exhibitions (Russian: Всероссийские промышленные (мануфактурные) выставки) were a series of 16 exhibitions in the 19th century Russian Empire.

Industrial exhibitions was organised by the law of 1828 under the jurisdiction of the Trade and Manufactory Department of the Ministry of Finance.

== Timeline ==
Year	City
1829	Saint Petersburg
1831	Moscow
1833	Saint Petersburg
1835	Moscow
1839	Warsaw
1841	Saint Petersburg
1843	Moscow
1845	Warsaw
1849	Saint Petersburg
1853	Moscow
1857	Warsaw
1861	Saint Petersburg
1865	Moscow
1870	Saint Petersburg
1882	Moscow
1896	Nizhny Novgorod
