= Cybertecture Egg =

Commercial building in Mumbai

The Cybertecture Egg is a 13-story commercial building located in Bandra kurla complex Mumbai, Maharashtra, India. Architect James Law designed the Cybertecture Egg along with Ove Arup's building systems and engineering firm. The building was designed with sustainability in mind and has 33,000 sqm of office space, an elevated garden, and three levels of basement with 400 parking spaces, all in about 15% less space than a traditional office building. The structure of the Cybertecture Egg uses a diagrid exoskeleton, which forms a rigid structural system and allows it to be built with less building material than a traditional orthogonal building. The building will use wind turbines and solar photovoltaic panels to generate onsite electricity. There is also a greywater recycling system which uses water for landscaping and irrigation.
