= Burton process =

The Burton process is a thermal cracking process invented by William Merriam Burton and Robert E. Humphreys, both of whom held a PhD in chemistry from Johns Hopkins University. The process they developed is commonly referred to as the Burton process. However, it should be recognized as the Burton-Humphreys process, as both individuals played pivotal roles in its development. The legal dispute surrounding this matter was eventually settled, although the decision primarily recognized Burton's contributions.

The process involves the destructive distillation of crude oil, which is heated under pressure in a still. The innovative design of this still allows various products to emerge from a bubble tower at different temperatures and pressures. One crucial aspect of the process is that it significantly increased gasoline production from various types of oil, more than doubling the output. The first large-scale implementation of these towers occurred when Standard Oil of Indiana made the decision to construct 120 stills using an authorized budget of $709,000 in 1911. Notably, this decision coincided with the US Supreme Court's ruling to dissolve the Standard Oil Trust.

This thermal cracking process was patented on January 7, 1913 (Patent No. 1,049,667). The first thermal cracking method, the Shukhov cracking process, was invented by Vladimir Shukhov (Patent of Russian Empire No. 12926 on November 27, 1891). While the Russians contended that the Burton process was essentially a slight modification of the Shukhov process, Americans refused to concede and the Burton-Humphreys patent remained in use. Ultimately, it contributed to the development of petrochemicals.

In 1937 the Burton process was superseded by catalytic cracking, but it is still in use today to produce diesel.
