= Alexander Bari =

Russian and American engineer and entrepreneur (1847–1913)

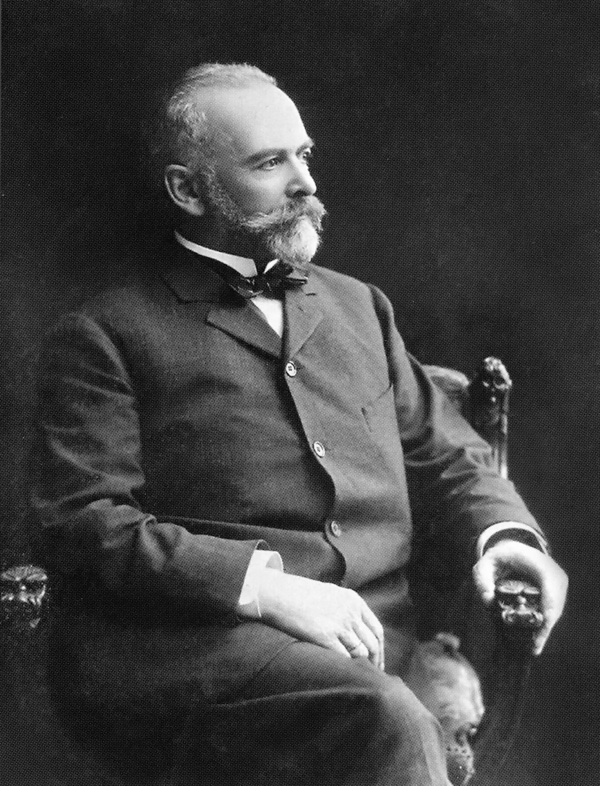
- Born: Alexander Veniaminovich Bari; May 18, 1847; Saint Petersburg, Russian Empire
- Died: April 19, 1913 (aged 65); Moscow, Russian Empire

Alexander Veniaminovich Bari (Russian: Александр Вениаминович Бари; May 6 [O.S. May 18] 1847 – April 19, 1913) was a Russian and American engineer, entrepreneur and social activist, founder of the first Russian engineering company. Bari was a close friend of Vladimir Shukhov, Leo Tolstoy, Dmitri Mendeleev, Nikolay Zhukovsky, Fyodor Schechtel, Ivan Rerberg.

== Biography ==
Alexander Bari was born on May 6 [O.S. May 18] 1847 in Saint Petersburg. He was the second son of a well-educated Baptized Jew Veneamin Bari. Veneamin Bari was a publicist, striving to educate Jews, he was favoured by Alexander von Humboldt, in whose honour the son was named.

Veneamin Bari, who at that time was corresponding with Karl Marx, was forced to leave the Russian Empire and in 1862 emigrated to Swiss Zürich with his children and wife Henriette Sergeevna. In 1865 the family moved to the US, but Alexander stayed in Zürich and graduated from a gymnasium in 1867. In 1870 he graduated from ETH Zurich with a degree in engineering. During his university years, he met Fyodor Orlov, who later recalled Bari as a leader of a student fellowship, who introduced him to the ETH and the city life. He particularly remembered how Bari acquainted a young man in a café, who turned out to be a son of a factory owner, and on the next day they were invited to have a tour around the father's factory.

After graduation, Alexander Bari decided to reconcile with his family and went to the USA. As he had no means to purchase a ticket, he took the job as an assistant engineer on the steamer. In the USA Bari received citizenship and started working as an assistant engineer at a machine and bridge-building plant in Detroit, later he was hired as an engineer at an industrial company in Philadelphia. Soon he won a competition to build pavilions for the Centennial Exposition and received the gold medal.

A Russian delegation visited the Exhibition, Bari acquainted several professors and students of the Russian Imperial Technical School (RITS), such as Fyodor Orlov, Pavel Panayev, Alexander Eshliman, Vladimir Shukhov, Dmitry Sovetkin. Bari helped the Russians a purchase of laboratory equipment, tools, and instruments. In gratitude he was elected as a corresponding member of the RITS in 1877.

In Philadelphia, he met Eda von Grunberg (Zinaida Jakovlevna in Russian), his future wife. She was from a German family that moved to Russia in the times of Catherine the Great. Eda came to Philadelphia with her elder sister, who married Alexander's older brother. Eda wanted to go back to Russia, in Summer 1877 the couple with their daughter Anna came to St Petersburg. Alexander and his younger brother William, a SPMU graduate, co-founded a small enterprise to construct and produce electric motors. However, the production found no demand in Russia. Soon Bari acquainted N. A. Sytenko, a retired engineer colonel and a member of the Russian Imperial Technical Society. Together they launched ‘Bari, Sytenko and Co’ and entered the construction business in the Russian petroleum industry. Soon Bari and his family moved to Moscow.

=== Kuskovo Plant ===
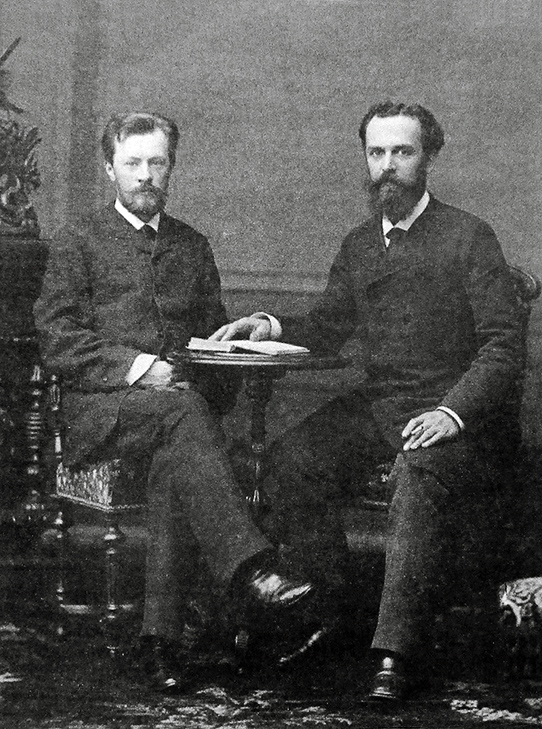
Vladimir Shukhov and Alexander Bari, the 1880s

The development and implementation of all ‘Bari, Sytenko and Co’ projects were managed by Ludvig Nobel. The company engaged in oil production in Grozny and Baku. The promising young engineer Vladimir Shukhov was invited to work by Bari. The highly successful project resulted in the establishment of the Branobel that soon became one of the leading oil companies in Russia and Europe.

The first 10 km long oil pipeline on the Absheron Peninsula was opened in Autumn 1878, it started at Balaxanı and ended in the Black City. The pipe's diameter was 0,76 m. In 1879 the second Russian oil pipeline was opened by ‘G. M. Lianozov and Co’.

On September 13, 1880, Sytenko, Bari, and the titular councillor N. Rubinsky sent to the office of Moscow Governor-General a request for construction of an oil plant in the capital. The document was signed on November 19, soon followed by the establishment of the Russian-American Oil Partnership with a capital stock of 375,000 roubles. The enterprise processed oil from Baku in the Kuskovo Refinery. The plant was constructed by Vladimir Shukhov, it had eight oil stills and produced Kerosene, Astroline, lubricants, and brea.

The refinery became operational on June 8, 1881. The witness recalled that

the plant was situated in the Vyhino district on the company land and connected to the Nizhny Novgorod railroad. The oil is shipped from Baku to Nizhny Novgorod down the Volga river and then moved by trains to Kuskovo. The refinery was equipped with several tanks that held 5000 buckets, 15 men worked on site.

At the All-Russia Exhibition of 1882 in Moscow, Kuskovo Refinery was awarded with a bronze prize for high quality oil production. In June 1882 the company hired young Dmitri Mendeleev as a chemistry and production consultant. Soon it launched a continuous crude distillation. In the same year Bari sold his share to Pyotr Gubonin and started his own business.

=== A. V. Bari Construction Company ===
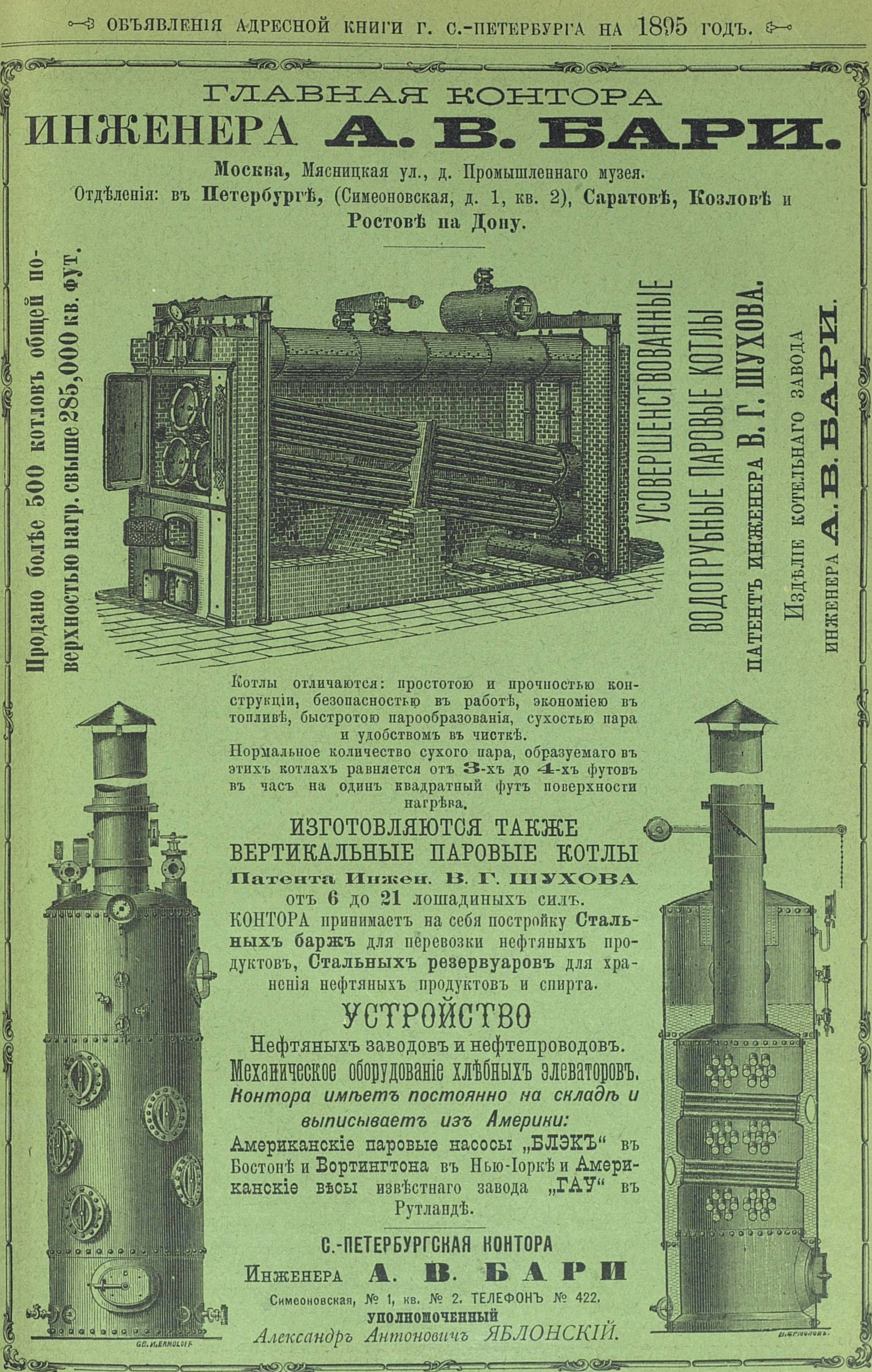
‘A. V. Bari Construction Company’ commercial, 1895

In 1880 Alexander Bari founded the ‘A. V. Bari Technical Company’ and invited Vladimir Shukhov as a chief engineer. Later the company was renamed into ‘A. V. Bari Construction Company’. It offered various services from design to construction and soon gained wide recognition both in the Russian Empire and abroad.

In a few years, the company produced a special steam boiler, designed by Vladimir Shukhov. To mass-produce the invention, Bari built the A. V. Bari Boiler Plant in Tyufeleva Roscha of the Danilovsky District. It became operational in February 1884. In five years since its foundation ‘Bari Technical Company’ assets included the boiler plant in Moscow and several branch offices in Saint Petersburg, Kharkiv, Nizhny Novgorod, and Yekaterinburg.

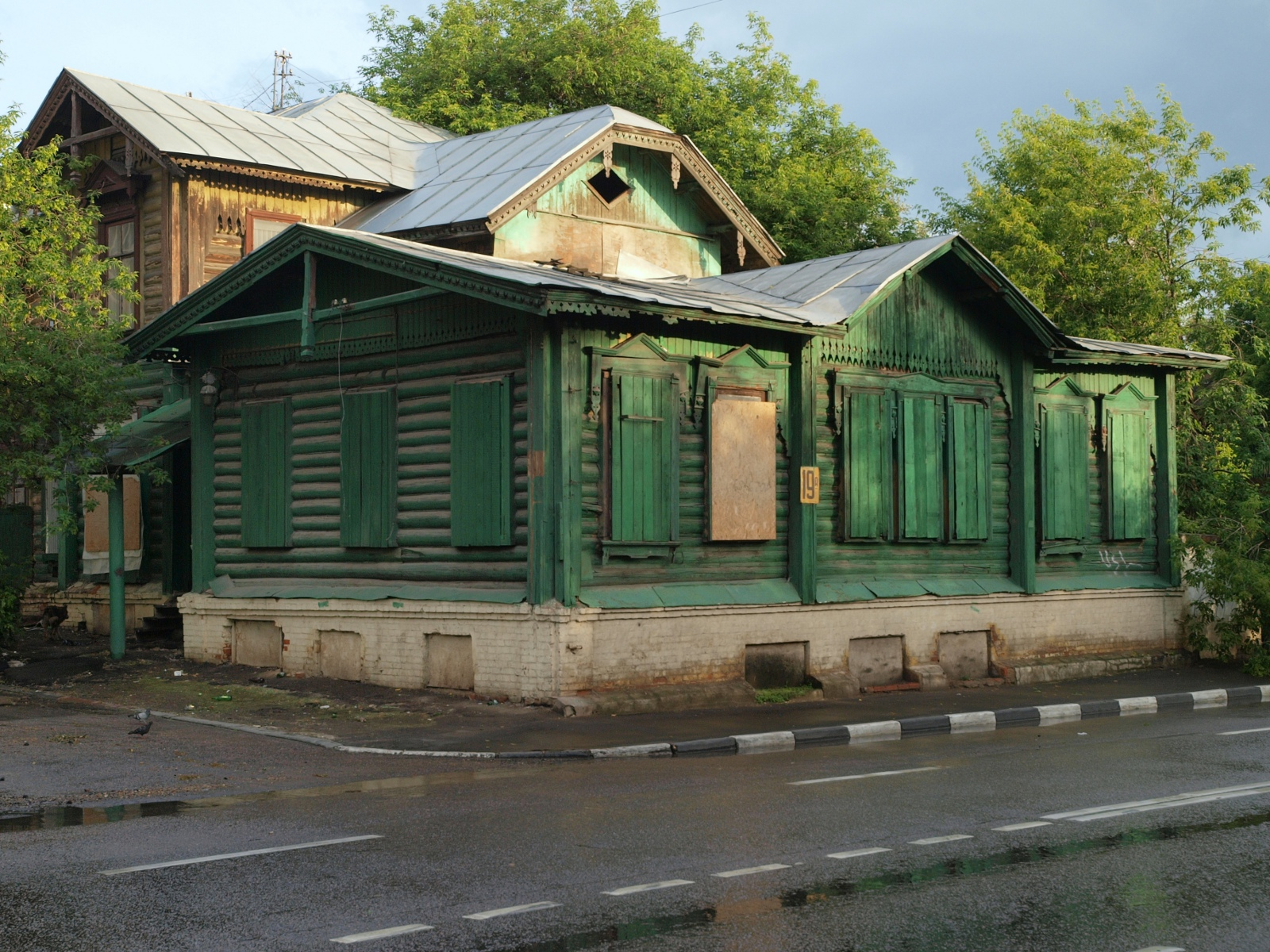
One of the preserved buildings of the former Bari plant (2010)

Bari introduced a whole new working environment: he paid salaries 10% higher than average on the market, working hours were shorter, the employees received hot meals at an employer's expense. Bari also offered a kind of medical leave — in case of sickness a worker was paid full salary for the first week and 50% for the second.

The company produced steel oil storage tanks, in 30 years it manufactured 3240 units. From 1885 the enterprise participated in the creation of the oil cargo fleet. The tankers were built at Saratov and Volgograd shipyards. Shipowners Baranov and Shitov ordered two steel oil lighters with 40 and 50 thousand poods capacity.

The ‘A. V. Bari Technical Company’ also constructed other objects, such as oil pipelines, grain elevators, bridges, Hyperboloid towers, etc. Since 1892 the company actively participated in the development of the Russian Railways. It displayed several pavilions at the All-Russia Exhibition of 1896 in Nizhny Novgorod.

The ‘A. V. Bari Technical Company’ took part in the reconstruction of the Mytishchi Public Waterline and the building of the Metrowagonmash.

=== Personal life ===
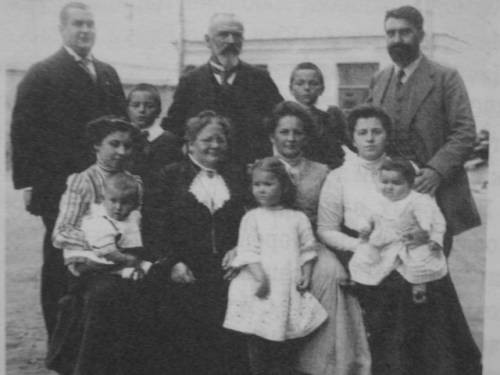
A. V. Bari with his family, the 1880s

Alexander Bari was a friend of many brightest people of his time — Dmitri Mendeleev, Nikolay Zhukovsky, Sergey Chaplygin, Fyodor Schechtel, Ivan Rerberg, and others were frequent guests in his house. Since 1884 Bari lived at Myasnitskaya st., 24, later he moved to the house №22.

In 1898 Bari first met Leo Tolstoy. With daughter Anna Alexandrovna he paid visits to the writer's house in Khamovniki.

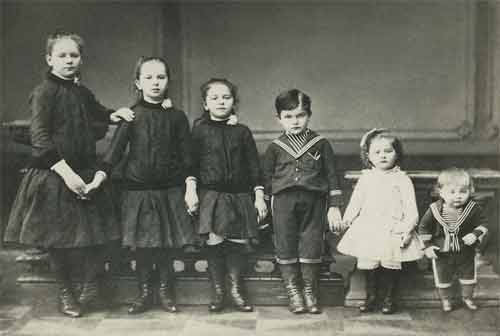
Children of Alexander Bari – Anna, Olga, Eugenia, Victor, Lidia, Vladimir. Moscow, January 1, 1889

When Russia faced difficult times, Bari told his wife that "its better to be a busman in Zürich than a millionaire in Russia" and asked her to leave the country. In September 1905 he wrote "Things get worse in the country and we only have to endure…" After the assassination of Pyotr Stolypin Bari wrote to his friends that ‘the situation is dreadful and the worst is coming’.

Despite all efforts, the company faced distress. The workers at factories talked Bari's employees into going on strikes and joining the revolutionary movement. This significantly affected the business. In 1909 Alexander Bari retired and entrusted the company to son Victor.

Alexander Bari died on April 6 [O.S. April 19] 1913 and was interred in Vvedenskoye Cemetery. The widow Zinaida Bari inherited the business, her brother Vladimir managed her assets. The obituary in the newspaper Utro Rossii noted that:

Alexander Bari founded the Russian-American Kerosene Factory in Moscow, he established the Moscow Oil Industrial Society in Grozny, created the car-building plant in Mytishchi and opened an exceptional boiler plant near the Simonov Monastery. His business interests were wide and interesting, he could simultaneously build bridges in Orenburg, steel barges on Danube and locomotive works in Vologda.

Under different circumstances, in some other country A. V. Bari could have become the next J. P. Morgan or Andrew Carnegie, but he was a true Russian in his soul, he loved his Fatherland and dealing with millions gave the major part of his capital to the workers. He was a generous philanthropist and there were hundreds of people, whom he supported financially.

In April 1918, Izvestia published an article exposing the counter-revolutionary conspiracy headed by Vladimir Bari, he was arrested and interrogated by Felix Dzerzhinsky. Vladimir Bari was released on the intervention of the American consul and soon emigrated. Shortly afterwards, Victor Bari and all his family left the country.

Olga Bari (1879–1954), one of Alexander Bari's daughters, became an artist and was one of the Mir iskusstva members. She lived in the USSR for all her life and scarcely exhibited.

== Sources ==
- Shukhova, E. M. (2003). "Chapter 4: Alexander Veniaminovich Bari". Владимир Григорьевич Шухов. Первый инженер России [Vladimir Grigoryevich Shukhov: The first Russian Engineer] (in Russian). The Bauman Moscow State Technical University. pp. 35–37. ISBN 5-7038-2295-5.
