= Shukhov Tower on the Oka River =

Electrical transmission tower in Russia

Coordinates: 56°11′36″N 43°32′35″E

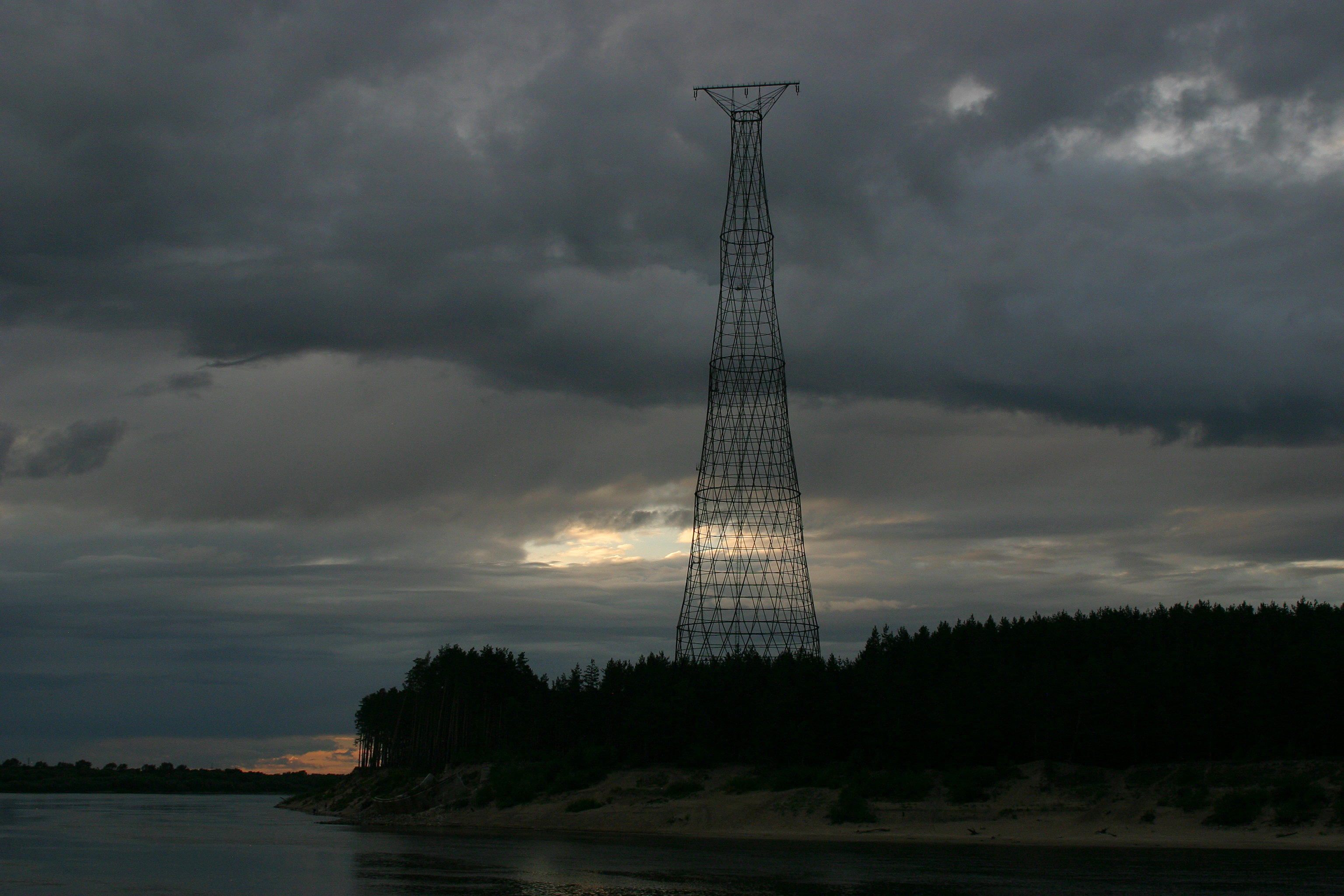
Originally built as a matching, identical pair, there is only one currently standing. The remaining Shukhov Tower was built for the power line crossing, after its twin was destroyed – 2006

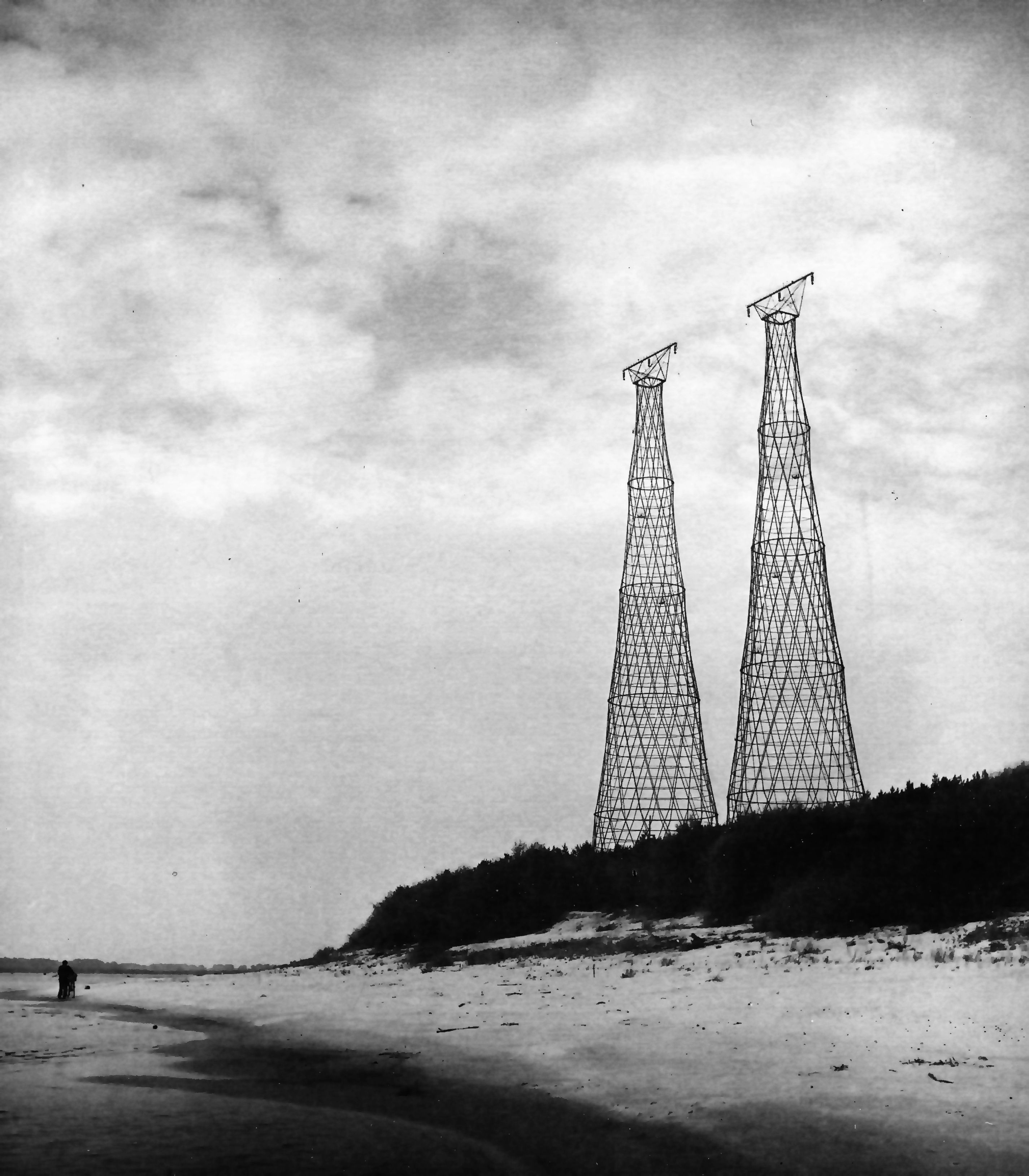
The two 128-meter towers in 1988, shortly before the power line was decommissioned a year later.

The Shukhov Tower on the Oka River (also Dzerzhinsk High-Voltage Mast, Shukhov Oka Tower) is one of the world’s two tallest (the other being the Shukhov Tower built between 1920–1922 in Moscow) diagrid hyperboloid transmission towers. It is located in Russia, in the western suburbs of Nizhny Novgorod, on the left bank of the Oka River near Dzerzhinsk (about 12 km away from the city center, near Dachny village). The tower is one of several structures designed by Russian engineer and scientist Vladimir Shukhov; its power lines, however, were decommissioned in 1989.

== History ==
The Shukhov Tower was a part of a 110 kV three-phase AC transmission line crossing the Oka River commissioned between 1927 and 1929. For the Oka River crossing, six hyperboloid pylons (three for each power-line) were built: a 20-metre-tall (66-foot) anchor pylon, a 68-metre-tall (223-foot) crossing pylon on the hillier south shore, and a 128-metre-tall (420-foot) crossing pylon on the lower terrain of the north shore.

In 1989, the power line was rerouted, and the 20- and 68-metre pylons were dismantled. The 128-metre pylons were left intact as a monument. Today, only one of the 128-metre pylons stands, as the other was illegally demolished for steel scrap in May 2005.

== Structure ==
The Shukhov Tower consists of five 25-metre (82 ft) steel lattice hyperboloid sections, stacked on top of each other. The sections are made of straight profiles, the ends of which rest against circular foundations. The tower's circular concrete foundation has a diameter of 30 metres (98 ft). The construction of the individual sections is an example of a doubly-ruled surface.

== Present condition ==
RAO UES, Russia's electricity company, used Shukhov's unique constructions for 70 years. The existing pylon currently requires maintenance and FGC UES is scheduled to repair it.

Partially-hyperboloid pylons of similar design can be seen near Cádiz, Spain.

== See also ==
- Shukhov Tower
- List of hyperboloid structures
- List of towers
- Zaporizhzhia Pylon Triple
