= Shukhov Rotunda =

Coordinates: 56°20′N 44°00′E

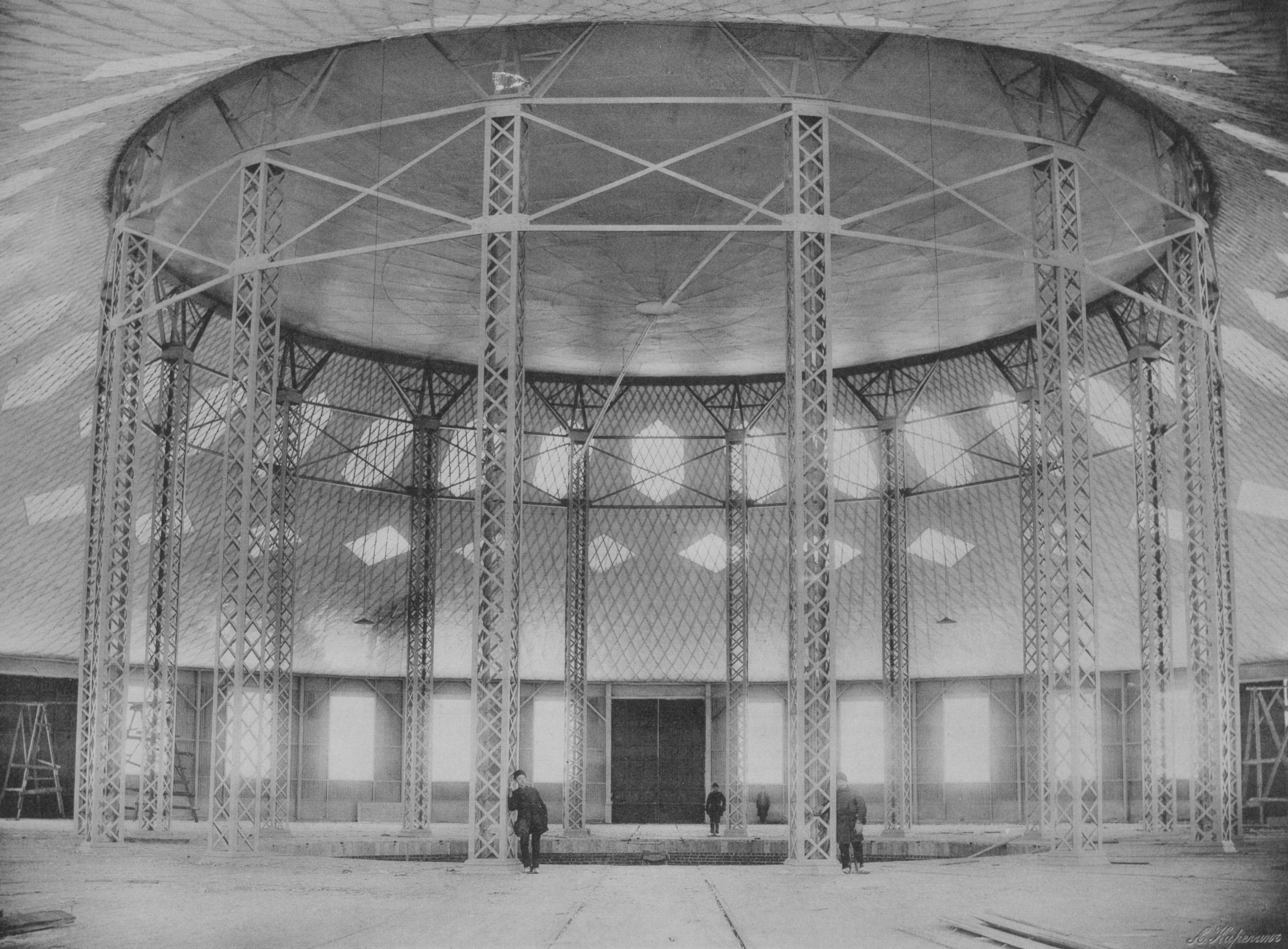
The World First Membrane roof and steel gridshell in the Rotunda by Vladimir Shukhov, Nizhny Novgorod, 1895

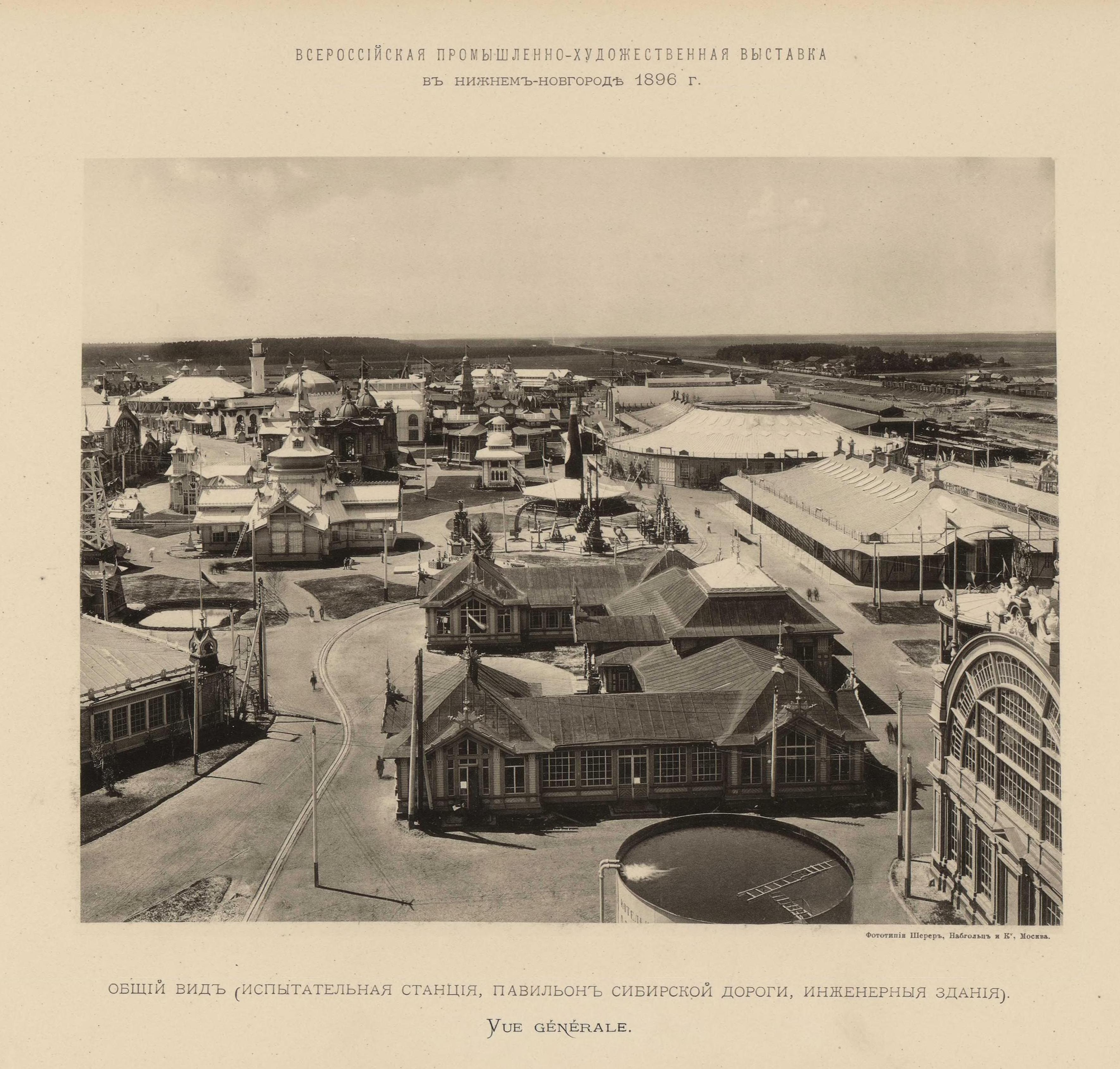
Rotunda and rectangular pavilion by Vladimir Shukhov, Nizhny Novgorod, 1896

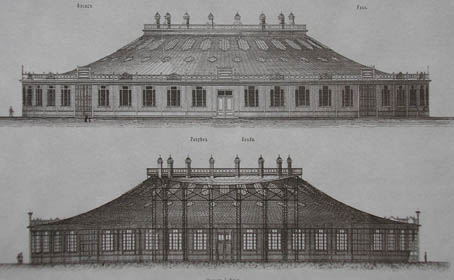
Rotunda by Shukhov, Nizhny Novgorod, 1896

Shukhov Rotunda was a round exhibition pavilion built for All-Russia Exhibition 1896 in Nizhny Novgorod, Russia. It was built in 1896 with a diagrid hanging cover (tensile gridshell – diagrid roof, Russian Empire patent No. 1894, dated March 12, 1899) and was the world's first Hyperboloid structure (in the center of the Rotunda). It is named after Vladimir Shukhov, who designed it in 1895.

The Rotunda was 16 metres (52 ft) high with a diameter of 68 metres (223 ft). The diameter of the steel membrane was 25 metres (82 ft).

The rotunda was subsequently moved to Yessentuki and demolished in the 1980s.

== See also ==
- Diagrid
- Thin-shell structure
- List of thin shell structures
- Tensile and membrane structures
- Structural engineering

== Sources ==
- "The Nijni-Novgorod exhibition: Water tower, room under construction, springing of 91 feet span", "The Engineer", № 19.3.1897, P.292-294, London, 1897.
- Brumfield, William Craft (1991). The Origins of Modernism in Russian Architecture. University of California Press. ISBN 978-0-520-06929-9.
- Elizabeth C. English: “Arkhitektura i mnimosti”: The origins of Soviet avant-garde rationalist architecture in the Russian mystical-philosophical and mathematical intellectual tradition”, a dissertation in architecture, 264 p., University of Pennsylvania, 2000.
- Rotonda of the Panrussian Exposition (1896) at Structurae

(in German)

- Graefe, Rainer; Gappoev, Murat; Pertschi, Ottmar; Bach, Klaus; Auslandsbeziehungen, Institut für (1990). Vladimir G. Šuchov (in French). Deutsche Verlags-Anstalt. ISBN 978-3-421-02984-3.
- Picon, Antoine; Pompidou, Centre Georges (1997). Art de l'Ingenieur: Construction Entrepreneur Inventeur. Centre Georges Pompidou-Ircam. ISBN 978-2-85850-911-9.

(in Italian) (in Russian)

- Шухов В. Г.: Избранные труды, том 1, «Строительная механика», 192 стр., под ред. А. Ю. Ишлинского, Академия наук СССР, Москва, 1977.
- Грефе Р. и др.: «В. Г. Шухов (1853—1939). Искусство конструкции.», «Мир», Москва, 1994, ISBN 978-5-03-002917-7.
- Шухова Е. М.: «Владимир Григорьевич Шухов. Первый инженер России.», 368 стр., Изд. МГТУ, Москва, 2003, ISBN 978-5-7038-2295-1.
