= Diagrid =

Structural design which uses diagonal members instead of columns

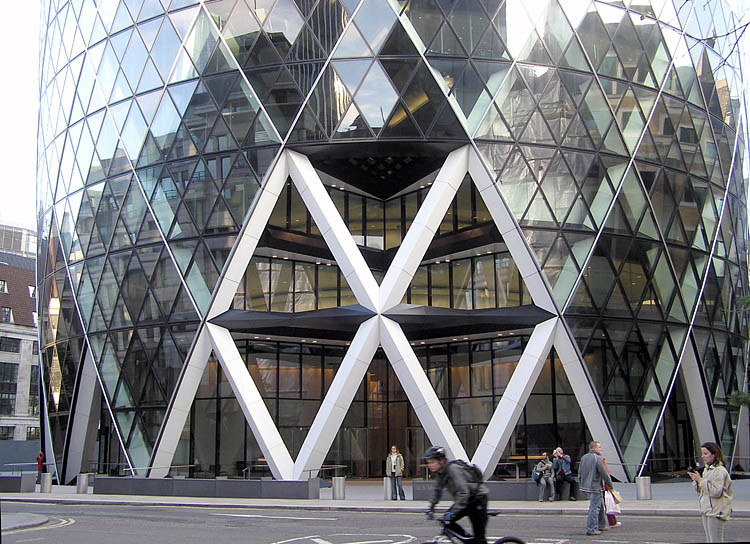
Base of 30 St Mary Axe, London, UK

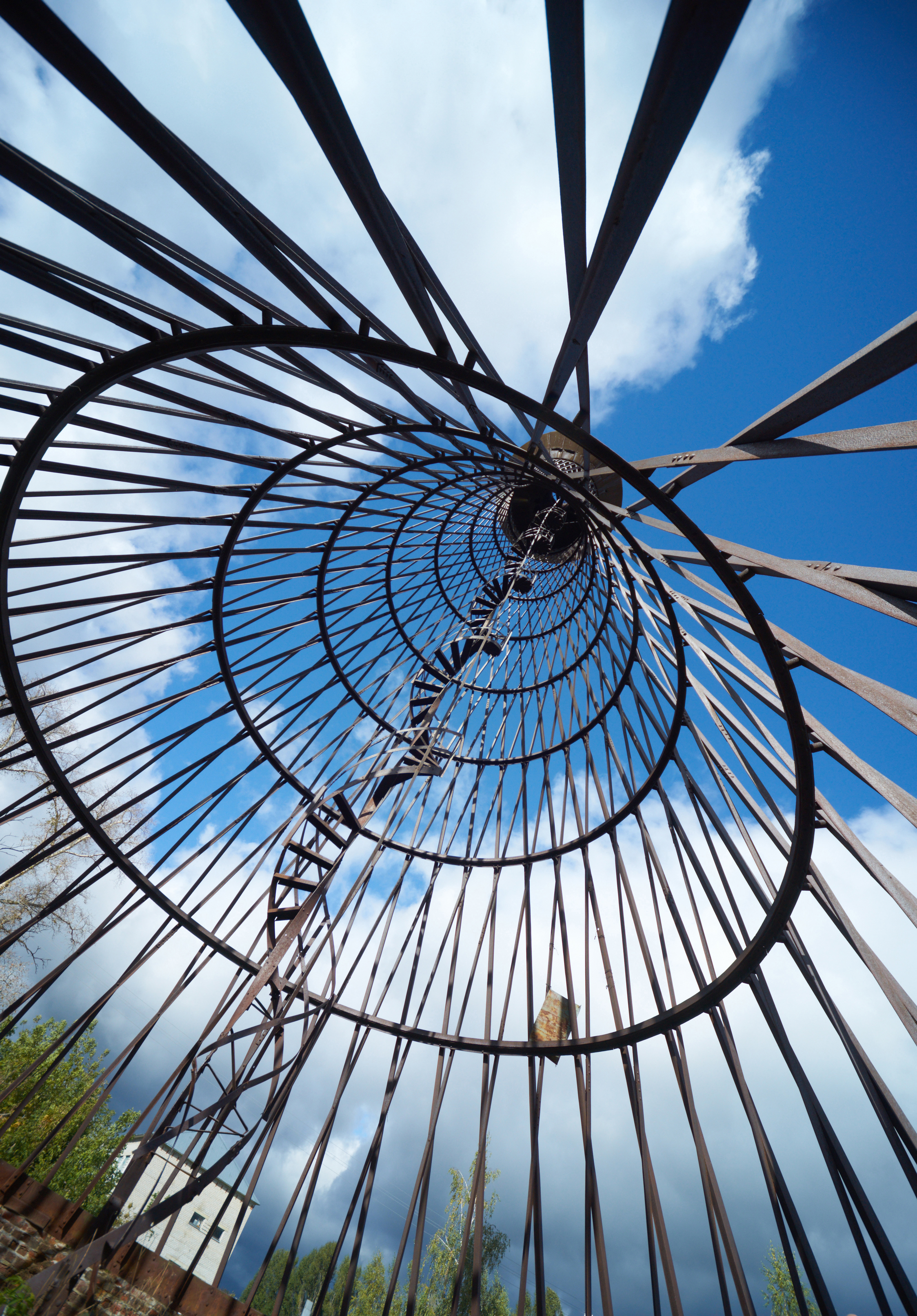
The world's first diagrid hyperboloid structure in Polibino, Russia

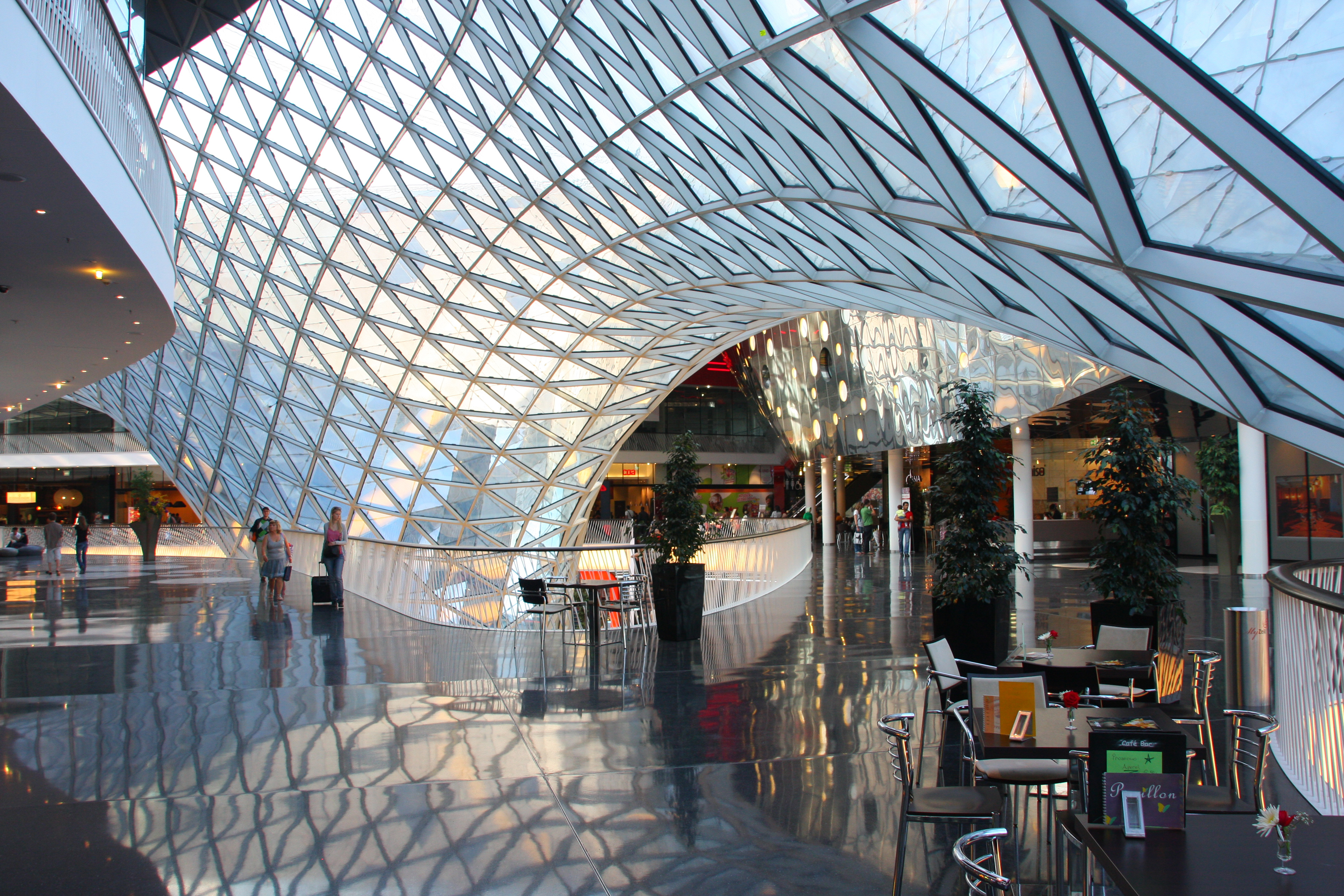
MyZeil, Frankfurt, Germany

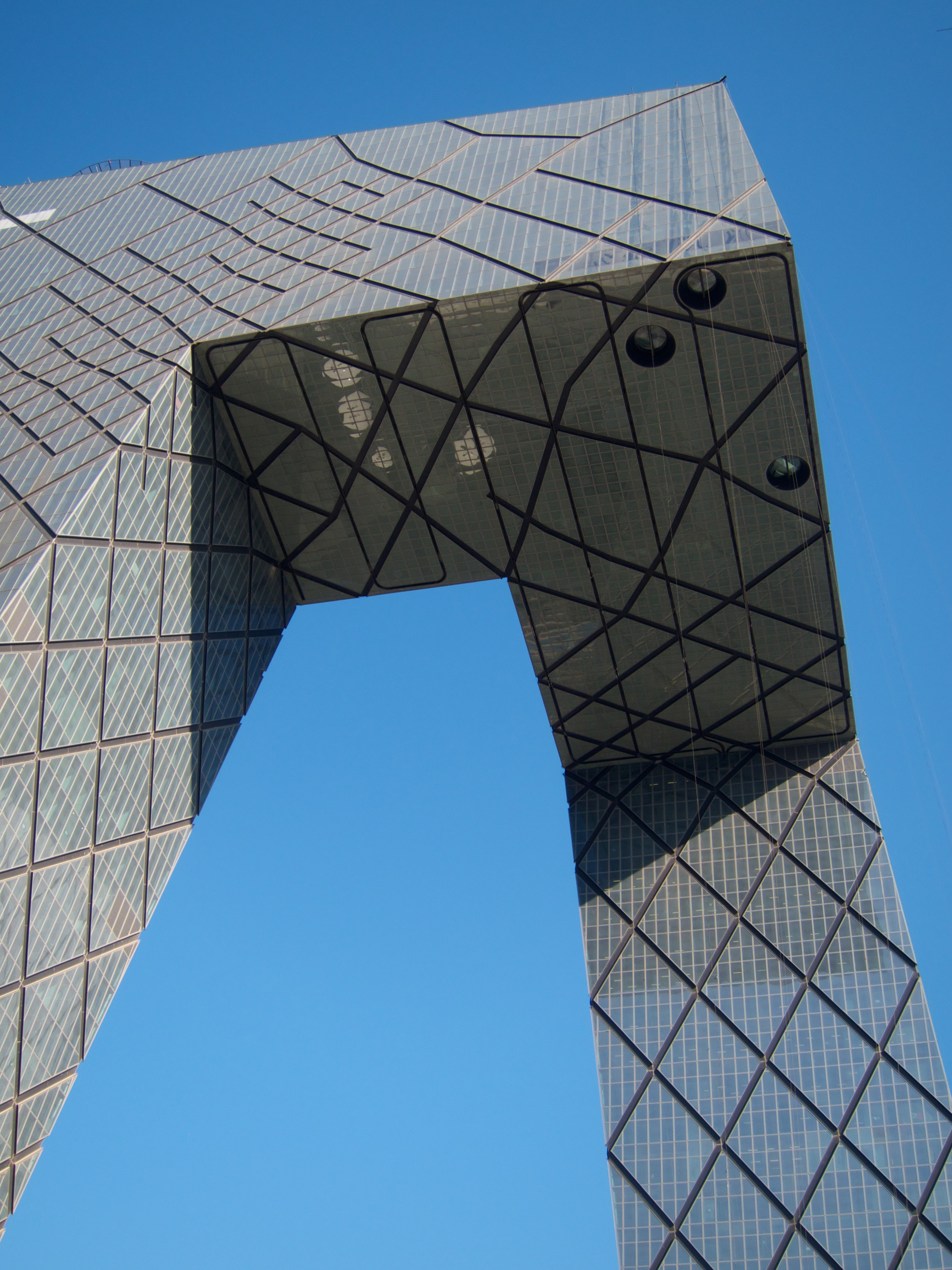
CCTV Headquarters, Beijing, China

A diagrid (a portmanteau of diagonal grid) is a framework of diagonally intersecting metal, concrete, or wooden beams that is used in the construction of buildings and roofs. It requires less structural steel than a conventional steel frame. Hearst Tower in New York City, designed by Norman Foster, uses 21 percent less steel than a standard design. The diagrid obviates the need for columns and can be used to make large column-free expanses of roofing. Another iconic building designed by Foster, 30 St Mary Axe, in London, UK, known as "The Gherkin", also uses the diagrid system.

British architect Ian Ritchie wrote in 2012:

The origin of 'diagonal' structures is surely the Russian genius Vladimir Shukhov. He pioneered new analytical methods in many different fields, and I have been fortunate to visit some of his constructed projects more than once. Shukhov left a lasting legacy to early Soviet Russia constructivism, and as the leading engineer and mathematician during the late 19th and early 20th century he created hyperboloid, thin shell and tensile structures of extraordinary refinement and elegance.

== Buildings utilizing diagrid ==
- Shukhov Tower in Polibino, Polibino, Russia (1896)
- Shukhov Rotunda at the All-Russia exhibition, Nizhny Novgorod, Russia (1896)
- Shukhov Tower, Moscow, Russia
- Hearst Tower, New York, USA
- 53W53, New York, USA
- 30 St Mary Axe, London, England
- 1 The Avenue, Manchester, England
- CCTV Headquarters, Beijing, China
- The Bow, Calgary, Canada
- Seattle Central Library, Seattle, USA
- Capital Gate, Abu Dhabi, United Arab Emirates
- Aldar headquarters, Abu Dhabi, United Arab Emirates
- Guangzhou International Finance Center, Guangzhou, China
- Queen Elizabeth II Great Court at the British Museum, London, England
- Nagoya Dome, Nagoya, Japan
- Westhafen Tower, Frankfurt, Germany
- Merdeka 118, Kuala Lumpur, Malaysia
- MyZeil, Frankfurt, Germany
- The Crystal, Copenhagen, Denmark
- United Steelworkers Building, Pittsburgh, USA
- Tornado Tower, Doha, Qatar
- Newfoundland Quay, London, England
- Lotte World Tower, Seoul, Republic of Korea
- Atrio Towers, Bogotá, Colombia
- King's Cross Station, London, England
- Bank of China Tower, Hong Kong

== See also ==
- Vladimir Shukhov
- Buckminster Fuller
- Frei Otto
- Norman Foster
- Gridshell
- Geodesic dome
- Hyperboloid structure
- Panrussian Exposition 1896
- Tensile and membrane structures
- Stretched grid method
- Isogrid
- Thin-shell structure

== Bibliography ==
- Design and construction of steel diagrid structures by K. Moon, School of Architecture, Yale University
- The diagrid system of Hearst Tower by the Steel Institute of New York
