= All-Russia Exhibition 1896 =

Industrial and art exhibition

Coordinates: 56°18′39″N 43°56′02″E

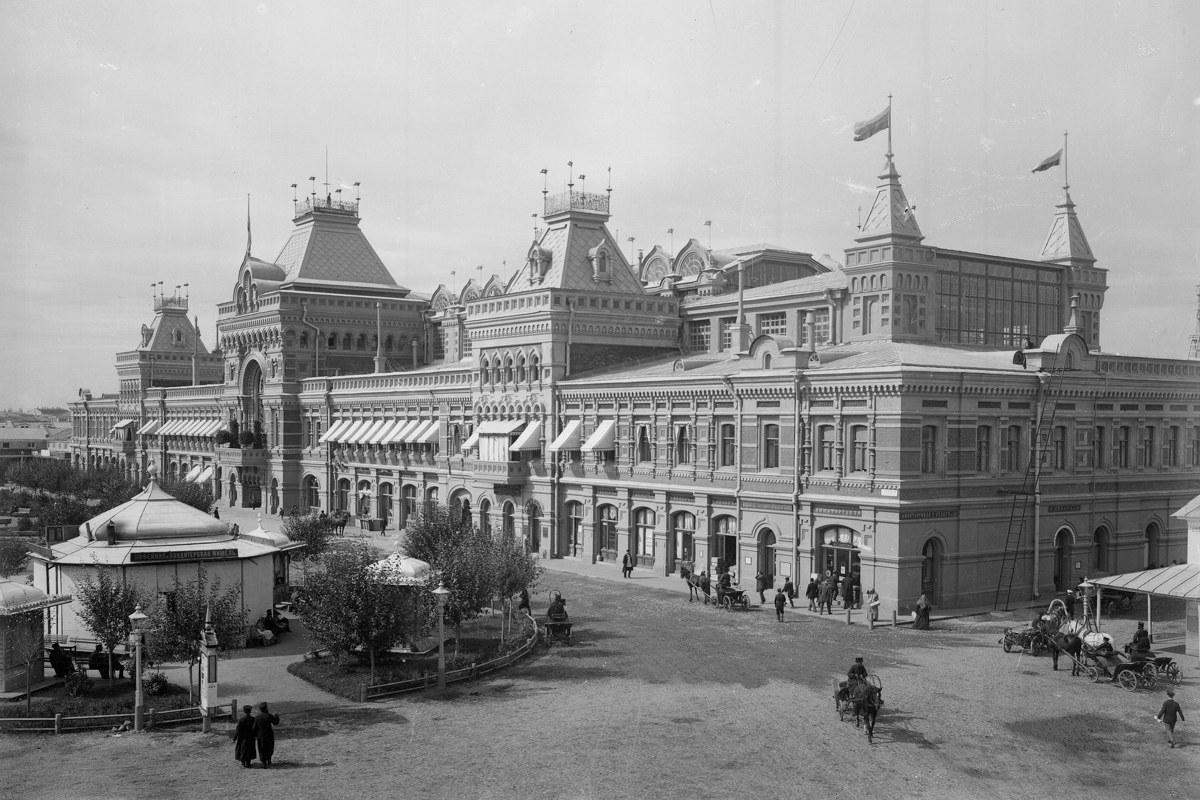
Main Fair building, Nizhny Novgorod, 1896

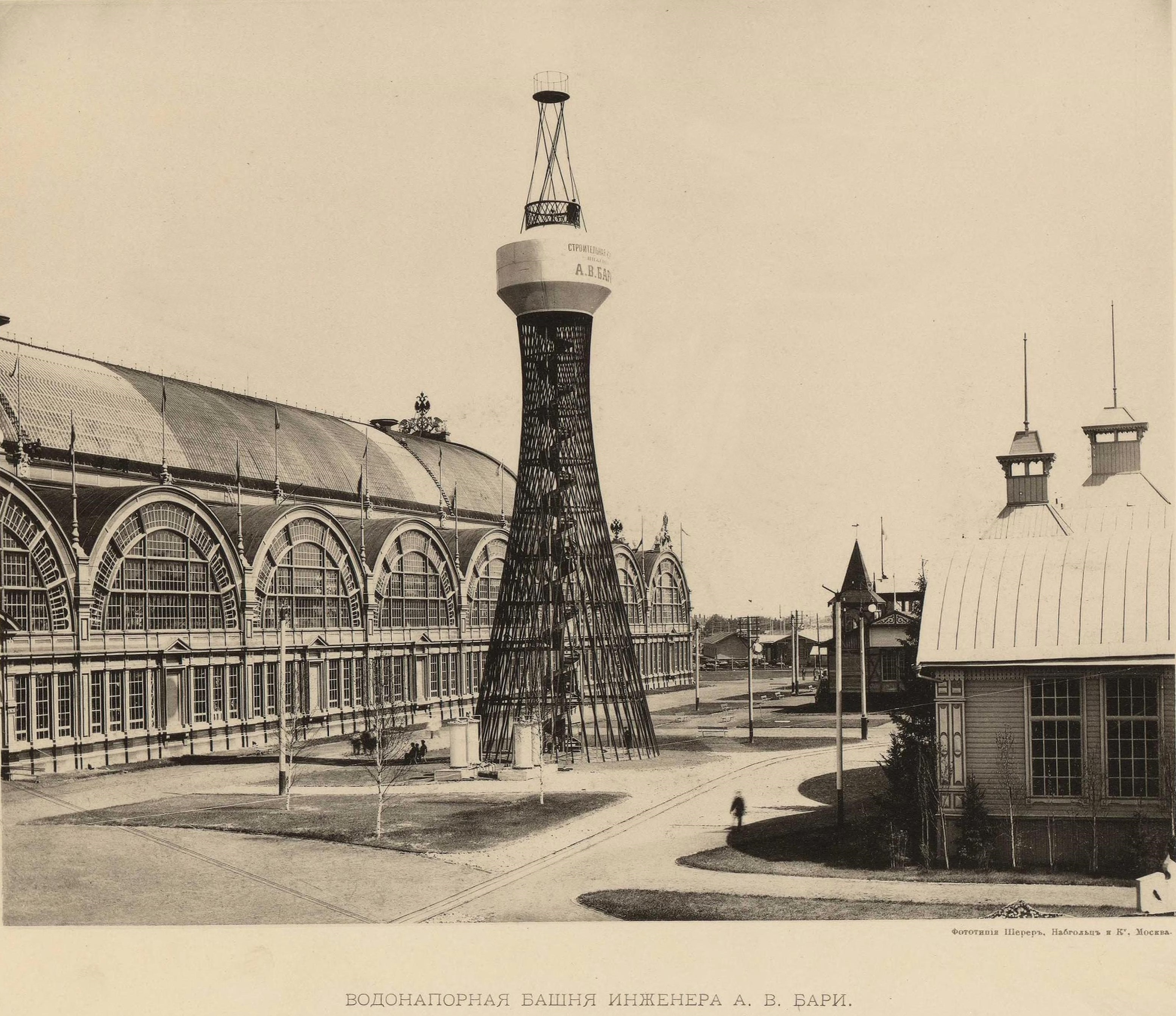
Shukhov Tower, the world's first hyperboloid structure by Vladimir Shukhov, Nizhny Novgorod, 1896

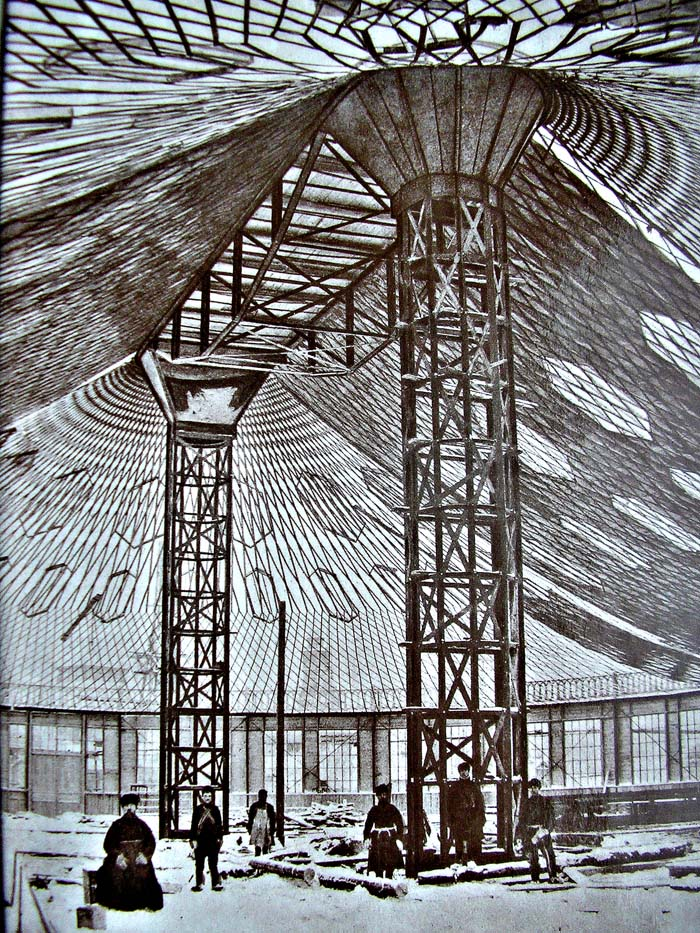
The world's first steel tensile structure by Shukhov (during construction), Nizhny Novgorod, 1896

The All-Russia industrial and art exhibition 1896 in Nizhny Novgorod was held from May 28 (June 9 N.S.) till October 1 (13 N.S.), 1896. The 1896 exhibition was the largest pre-revolution exhibition in the Russian Empire and was organized with money allotted by Nicholas II, Emperor of Russia. The All-Russia industrial conference was held together with the exhibition.

== Exhibits ==
The exhibition demonstrated the best achievements of the industrial development in Russia that began in the latter part of the 19th century:

- an early radio receiver (thunderstorm register) designed by Alexander Stepanovich Popov;
- the first Russian automobile designed by Evgeniy Yakovlev and Pyotr Freze;
- the world’s first hyperboloid steel tower-shell (Shukhov Tower) and the world’s first steel lattice hanging and arch-like overhead covers-shells (8 exhibition pavilions with the total area of more than 25 thousand square meters, including the unique Shukhov Rotunda of Vladimir Shukhov (Russian Empire patents № 1894, 1895, 1896 dated March 12, 1899);
- many other technical inventions, technologies and artistic achievements.

Savva Mamontov, who at the time was interested in building a railway between Vologda and Arkhangelsk, decided to open a Far North pavilion. He asked Konstantin Korovin, one of the most notable Russian artists at the time, to design the pavilion. In addition, he sponsored a number of trips for Korovin and other Russian artists, so that they could familiarize themselves with the topic. Korovin designed the pavilion and in addition painted ten big canvasses for the pavilion as well, depicting various aspects of Northern and Arctic lifestyle. After the closure of the Exhibition, the canvasses were eventually placed in the Yaroslavsky Rail Terminal in Moscow. In the 1960s, they were restored and transferred to the Tretyakov Gallery.

The suburb of Kanavino, on the left bank of Oka River, was chosen as the place for the exhibition. It occupied the territory of around 84 hectares within a few hundreds meters southwest of the Nizhny Novgorod Fair. Nearly 70 buildings and constructions were built in Nizhny Novgorod and at the exhibition with the money allotted by the Nicholas II Emperor of Russia. Also, more than 120 pavilions of private companies were built on the territory of the exhibition.

== Photos ==
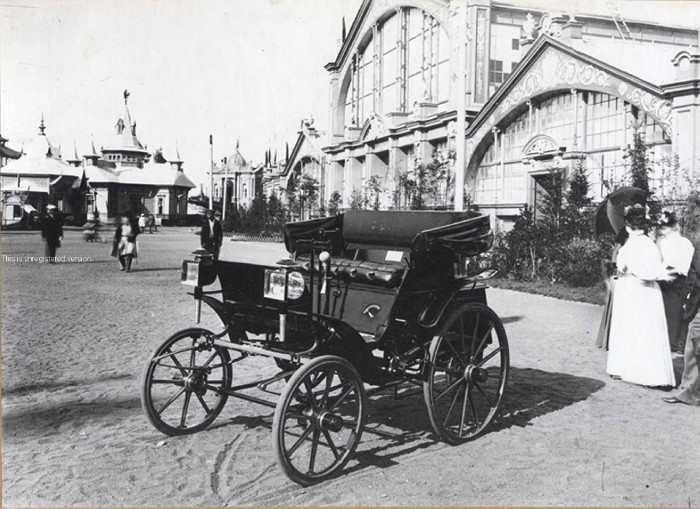
Yakovlev & Freze automobile

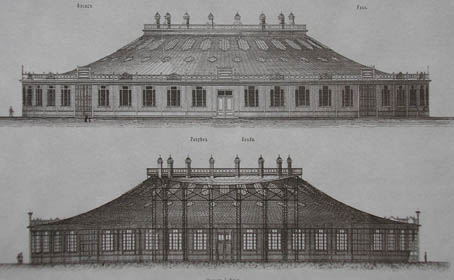
Rotunda by V.Shukhov

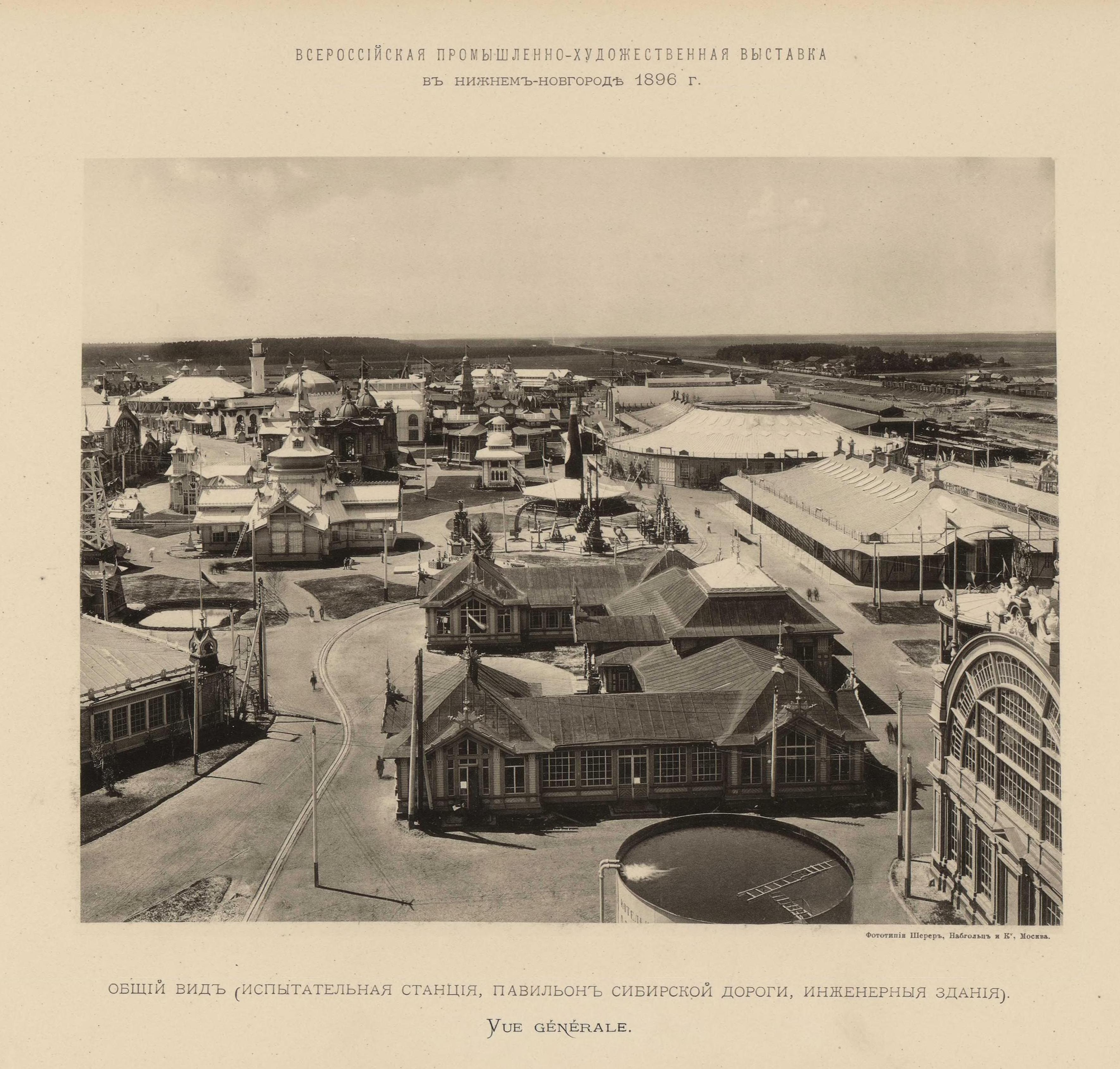
Shukhov Rotunda and rectangular pavilion

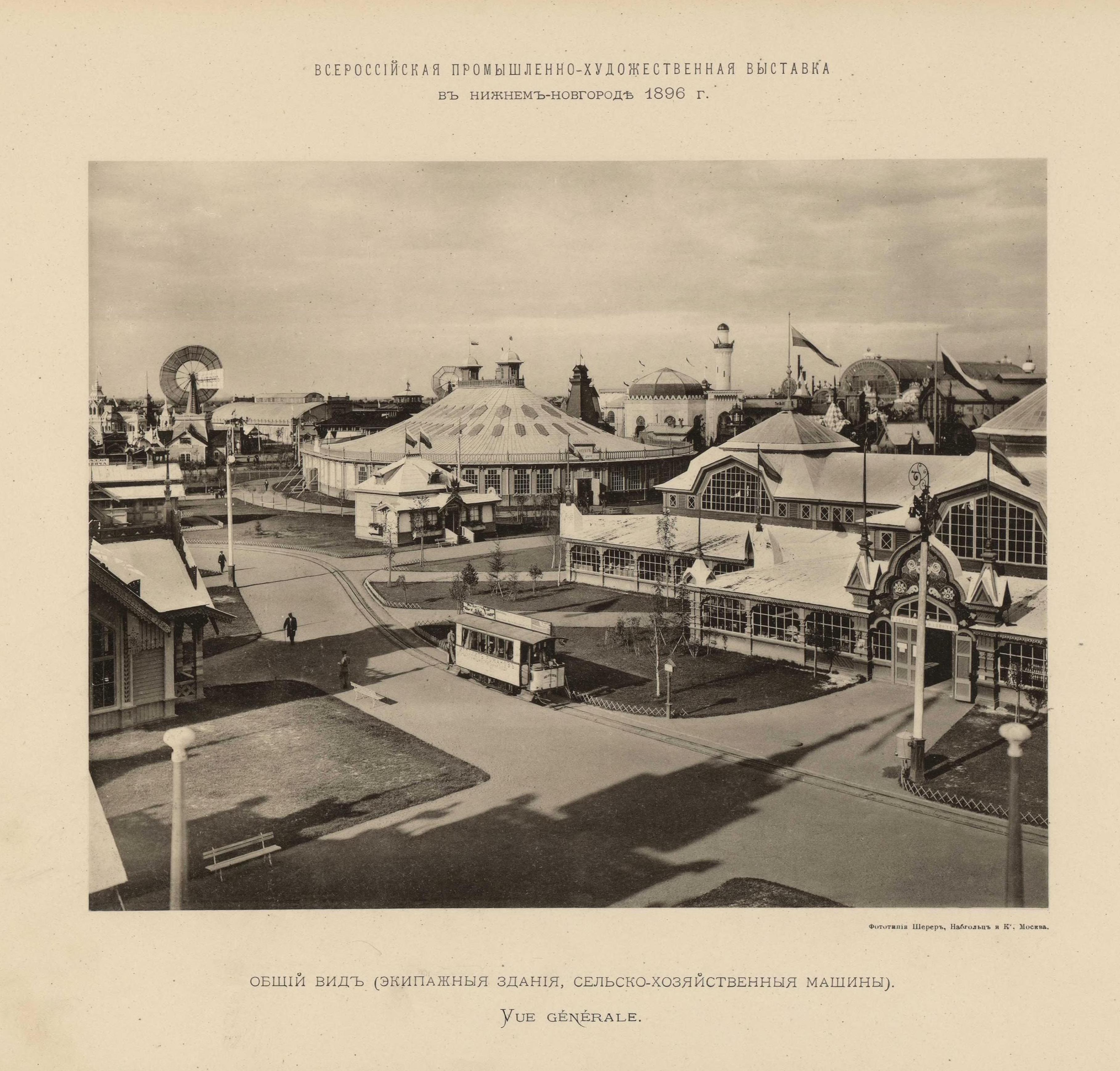
Oval pavilion by V.Shukhov

== See also ==
- World's fair
- All-Russia Exhibition 1882
