= Shukhov cracking process =

Thermal cracking process in oil refining

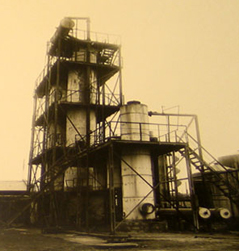
Refinery using the Shukhov cracking process, Baku, USSR, 1934

The Shukhov cracking process is a thermal cracking process invented by Vladimir Shukhov and Sergei Gavrilov.

== Origins ==
Shukhov designed and built the first thermal cracking device for the petrochemical industry. His patent (Shukhov cracking process – patent of Russian Empire No. 12926 from November 27, 1891) on cracking was used to invalidate Standard Oil's patents (Burton process – Patent of United States No. 1,049,667 on January 7, 1913) on oil refineries.

== Present ==
In 1937 the Shukhov cracking process was superseded by catalytic cracking. It is still in use today to produce diesel.

== See also ==
- Cracking (chemistry)
- Timeline of historic inventions
- Burton process
