= Vladimir Shukhov =

Russian polymath, engineer, scientist and architect (1853–1939)

- Владимир Шухов
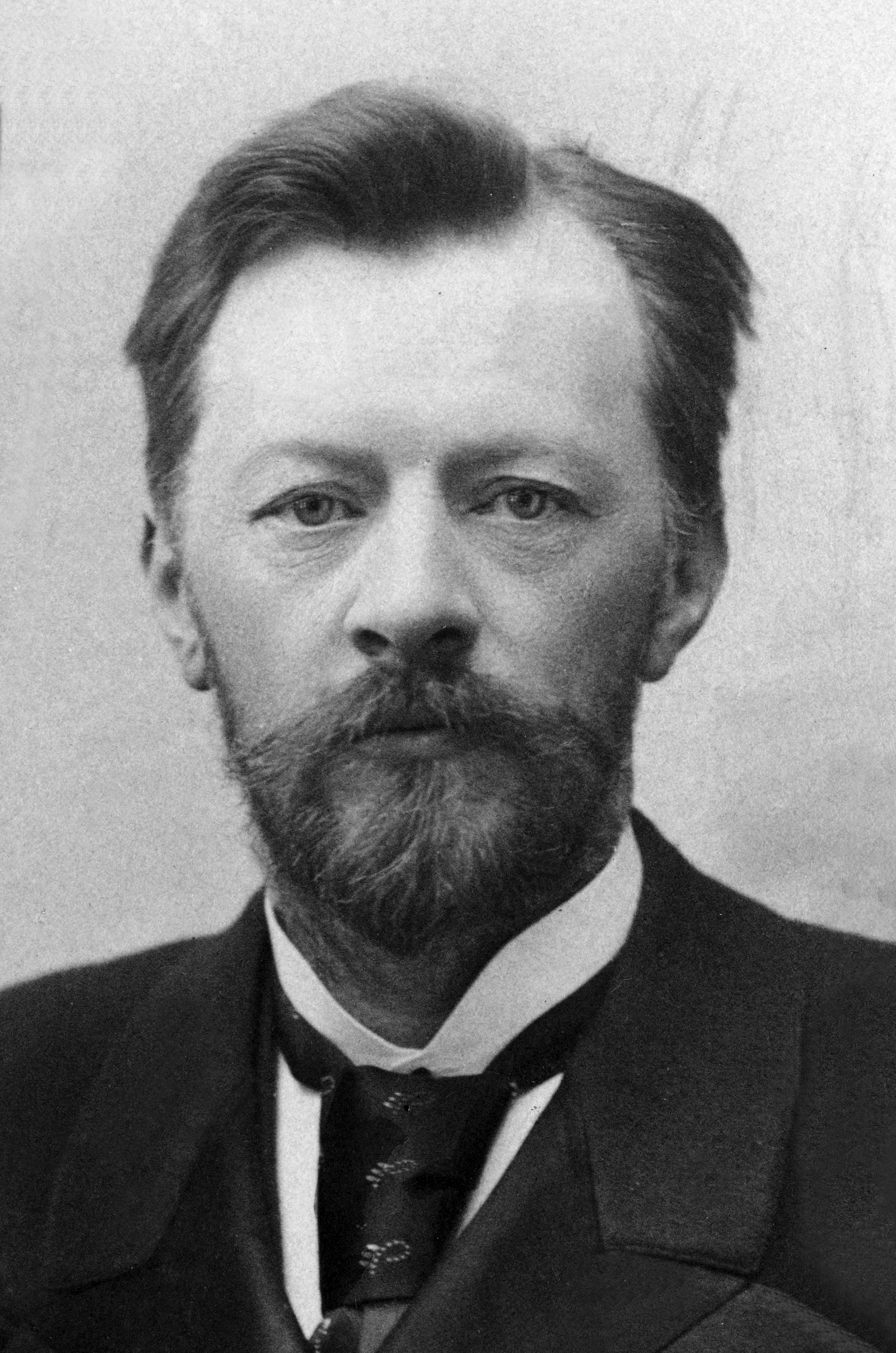
- Shukhov in 1891
- Born: 28 August [O.S. 16 August] 1853; Grayvoron, Kursk Governorate, Russian Empire
- Died: 2 February 1939 (aged 85); Moscow, Russian SFSR, Soviet Union
- Education: Imperial Moscow Technical Institute
- Spouse: Anna Nikolayevna Shukhova
- Children: Sergey, Flaviy, Vladimir
- Parent(s): Grigory Shukhov; Vera Shukhova
- Engineering career
- Discipline: Civil engineer Structural engineer
- Projects: Polibino Tower; Adziogol Lighthouse; Shukhov Tower; Oka River Tower
- Significant design: Shukhov Rotunda; Pushkin Museum; GUM; Kiyevsky railway station Novo-Ryazanskaya Garage; Bakhmetevsky Bus Garage
- Awards: Lenin Prize (1929)

Vladimir Grigoryevich Shukhov (Russian: Влади́мир Григо́рьевич Шу́хов; 28 August [O.S. 16 August] 1853 – 2 February 1939) was a Russian and Soviet engineer-polymath, scientist and architect renowned for his pioneering works on new methods of analysis for structural engineering that led to breakthroughs in industrial design of the world's first hyperboloid structures, diagrid shell structures, tensile structures, gridshell structures, oil reservoirs, pipelines, boilers, ships and barges. He is also the inventor of the first cracking method.

Besides the innovations he brought to the oil industry and the construction of numerous bridges and buildings, Shukhov was the inventor of a new family of doubly curved structural forms. These forms, based on non-Euclidean hyperbolic geometry, are known today as hyperboloids of revolution. Shukhov developed not only many varieties of light-weight hyperboloid towers and roof systems, but also the mathematics for their analysis. Shukhov is particularly reputed for his original designs of hyperboloid towers such as the Shukhov Tower.

== Biography ==
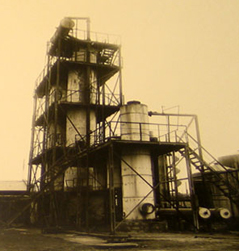
Refinery using the Shukhov cracking process, Baku, USSR, 1932

Vladimir Shukhov was born in Russian family, in a town of Graivoron, Belgorod uezd, Kursk Governorate (in present-day Belgorod Oblast) into a petty noble family. His father Grigory Ivanovich Shukhov was a minor government official, promoted for his efforts in the Crimean War. For a while, Grigory served as Mayor of Graivoron and later as an administrator in Warsaw.

In 1864 Vladimir entered Saint Petersburg gymnasium from which he graduated with distinction in 1871. During his high school years he showed mathematical talents, once demonstrating to his classmates and teacher an original proof of the Pythagorean theorem. The teacher praised his skills but he failed the grade for violating the textbook's guidelines.

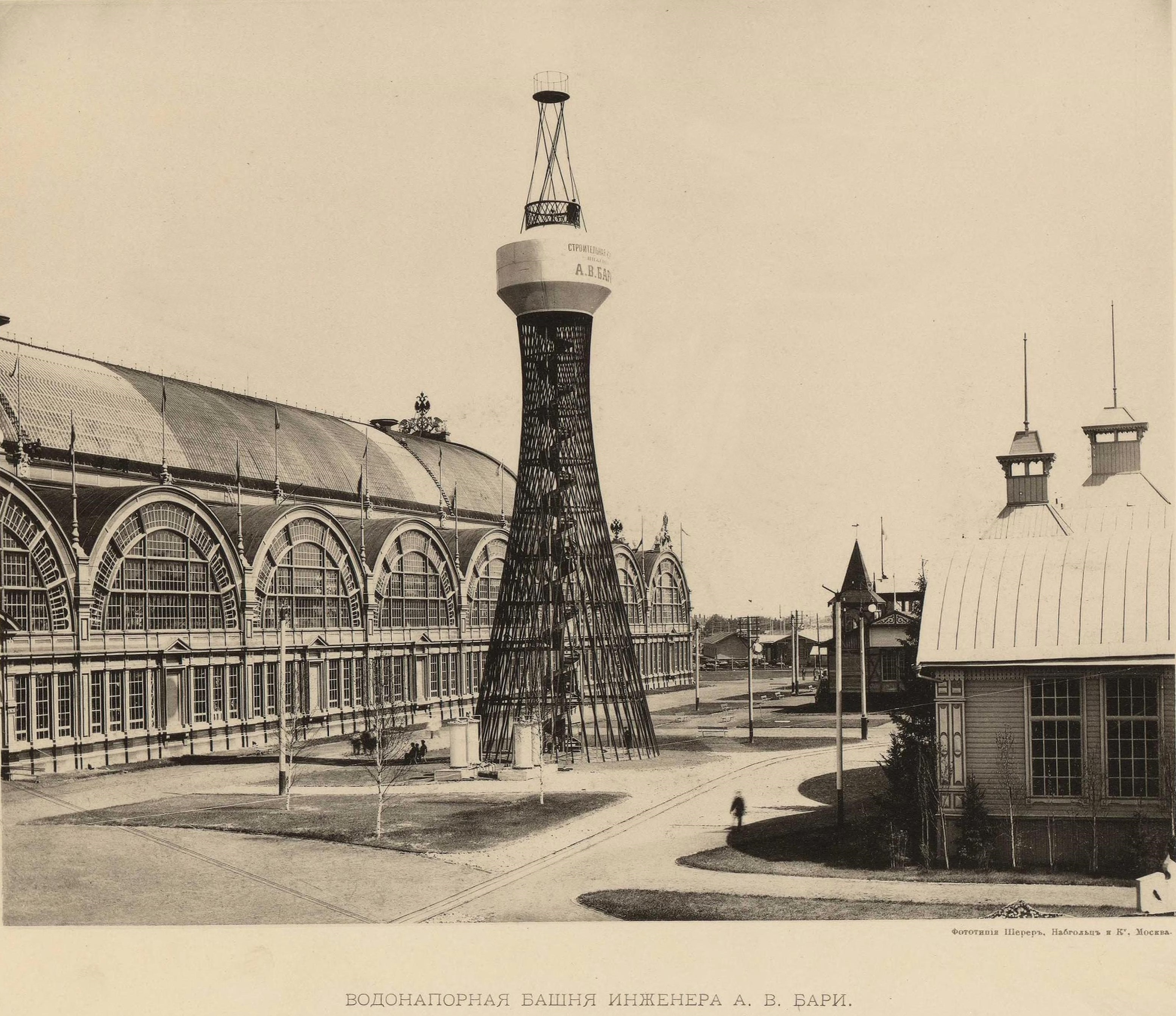
The world's first diagrid hyperboloid structure by Shukhov, Nizhny Novgorod, 1896

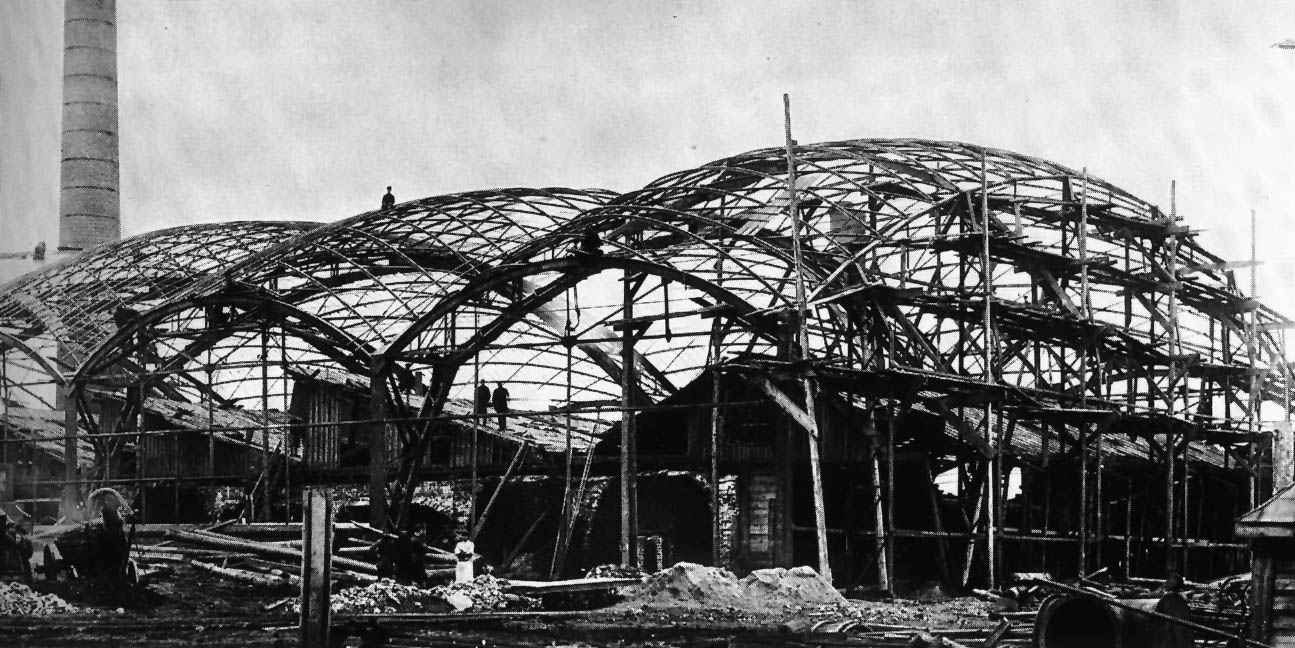
The world's first double curvature steel diagrid by Shukhov (during construction), Vyksa near Nizhny Novgorod, 1897.

After graduating from the gymnasium, Shukhov entered the Imperial Moscow Technical School, in which his teachers included Pafnuty Chebyshev, Aleksey Letnikov, and Nikolay Zhukovsky. In the beginning of the year 1876 Shukhov graduated from school with distinction and a Gold Medal. Chebyshev offered him a job as a lecturer in mathematics at the Imperial Moscow Technical School, but Shukhov decided to seek a job in the engineering industry instead.

In May 1876 Shukhov went to Philadelphia, to work on the Russian pavilion at the Centennial Exposition, the first official World's Fair in the United States, and to study the inner workings of the American construction and engineering industries. During his stay in the US, Shukhov came to know a Russian-American entrepreneur, Alexander Veniaminovich Bari who also worked on the organization of the Fair.

In 1877 Shukhov returned to Russia and joined the drafting office of the Warsaw–Vienna railroad. Within several months, Shukhov's frustration with standard and routine engineering made him abandon the office and join a military-medical academy.

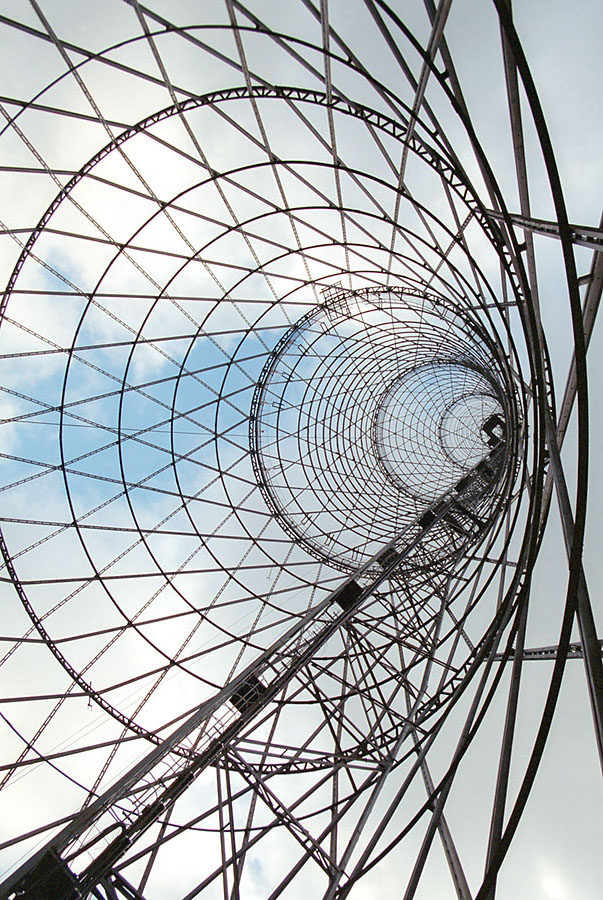
Shukhov Tower in Moscow.

On his coming to Russia in 1877, Bari persuaded Shukhov to give up his medical education and to assume the office of Chief Engineer in a new company specializing in innovative engineering. Shukhov worked with Bari at this company until the October Revolution. He also brought in Leonid Leibenson. Their works revolutionized many areas of civil engineering, ship engineering, and oil industry. The thermal cracking method, the Shukhov cracking process, was patented by Vladimir Shukhov in 1891.

Shukhov always found time for photography. The photographic works of Shukhov opened new trends ahead of their flourishing of fine art photography. He made photos in various genres: reporting, city landscape, portrait, constructivism. About two thousand photos and negatives made by Shukhov have survived until this day.

After the October Revolution Shukhov decided to stay in the Soviet Union despite having received alluring job offers from all around the world. Many signal Soviet engineering projects of the 1920s were associated with his name. In 1919 he framed his slogan: We should work independently from politics. The buildings, boilers, beams would be needed and so would we. In the later 1930s during the Great Purge he retired from engineering work but was not arrested or persecuted.

Shukhov died on 2 February 1939 in Moscow and was buried at the Novodevichy Cemetery. His many honours included the Lenin Prize (1929) and the title of Hero of Labour (1932).

== Works ==
Vladimir Shukhov is often referred as the Russian Edison for the sheer quantity and quality of his pioneering works. He was one of the first to develop practical calculations of stresses and deformations of beams, shells and membranes on elastic foundation. These theoretical results allowed him to design the first Russian oil tanker, new types of oil tanker barges, and a new type of oil reservoirs. The same principle of the shell on an elastic foundation allowed him to theoretically calculate the optimal diameter, wall thickness and fluid speed for fluid pipelines. Shukhov's projects were instrumental in constructing:

- An oil pipeline, the first in the Russian Empire, between Balkhany and Cherny Gorod near Baku (12 km, 1878 complete, used by the Branobel). By 1883 the total length of Shukhov-designed, Bari-built oil pipelines in Baku exceeded 94 km, transporting 30,000 barrels of oil per day. In 1894, a similar pipeline network was built in Grozny. Shukhov designed the first Trans-Caucasian kerosene pipeline between Baku and Batumi (835 km long) and Grozny-Tuapse pipeline (618 km long).
- A superior design for water-mains. Shukhov designed (and Bari built) complete water-supply systems for the cities of Cherkassy, Tambov, Kharkov, Voronezh and many others. In that age of infectious diseases his water-supply systems likely saved thousands of lives.
- A superior design for oil-tanker barges (less than half of the metal previously required), 84 150-meters long barges were built (mostly for the Volga river) as well as the first Russian seaworthy oil tanker ship. His approach to the ship strength analysis (using the model of a shell on an elastic foundation) was absolutely novel for that time.
- Shukhov-designed inexpensive oil tanks with the bottom calculated as a membrane on elastic foundation. They became very popular among oil-producers of the Imperial Russia. By 1881, 130 such tanks were built in Baku alone.

Shukhov made important contributions to the chemical industry:

- He designed and built an oil cracking plant. His patents (Shukhov cracking process – patent of Russian empire No. 12926 from 27 November 1891) on cracking were used to invalidate Standard Oil's patents (Burton process – Patent of USA No. 1,049,667 on 7 January 1913) on oil refineries.
- He designed an original oil pump. Shukhov's pumps revolutionized Baku's oil industry allowing to increase its oil output.
- He designed one of the first furnaces that used residual oil: before his work residual oil was considered a waste and was discarded, due to his work it became recognized as an important technical product known as a fuel oil.

Shukhov also left a lasting legacy to the Constructivist architecture of early Soviet Russia. As a leading specialist of metallic structures (hyperboloid structures, thin-shell structures, tensile structures), he may be compared with Gustave Eiffel. Shukhov's innovative and exquisite constructions still grace many towns across the former Russian Empire:

- Eight thin-shell structures exhibition pavilions for the All-Russia Exhibition in Nizhny Novgorod of 1896, covering the area of 27,000 m², and featuring an unorthodox water-tower that served as a model for more than 30 similar structures built in Imperial Russia, and thousands around the world now.
- About 200 original towers (hyperboloid steel gridshells) all over the world, the most famous being the 160-meter-high Shukhov Tower in Moscow (1922) and 70-meter-high Adziogol Lighthouse near Kherson (1910). On Shukhov's 110th birthday in 1963 Soviet Union issued a postal stamp showing Shukhov and his tower (pictured).
- Spacious elongated shop galleries, bridged with innovative metal-and-glass vaults, notably the Upper Trade Rows on Red Square (1889–94), Pushkin Museum of Fine Arts (1898–1912) and Petrovka Passage (1903–06).
- Enormous metal arch vaulting for the Municipal Railway Park (1908) and the Kievskiy Railway Station in Moscow (1912–17).
- The colossal hall of the Central Post Office, Moscow (1911–13).
- Truss-supported metal framework for the Central Universal Store in Moscow (1906–08).
- A rotating scene for the Moscow Art Theatre.
- Several Constructivist projects, designed in collaboration with Konstantin Melnikov, notably the Bakhmetevsky Bus Garage (1926–28) and Novo-Ryazanskaya Street Garage (1926–29).
- More than 180 bridges across the Volga, Yenisey, Dnieper, and other rivers.
- Stabilization Minaret of the Madrasah Ulugh Beg in Samarkand (Shukhov's last engineering work).

== Major works ==
The glass roof on the Pushkin Museum, 1899-1912 — video, 2011

- Grozny-Tuapse pipeline
- Shukhov Tower
- Shukhov Rotunda
- Adziogol Lighthouse
- Shukhov tower on the Oka River
- Pushkin Museum
- Moscow GUM
- Novo-Ryazanskaya Street Garage
- Bakhmetevsky Bus Garage
- Kievskiy Railway Station
- Hotel Metropol (Moscow)
- Petrovsky Passage
- Lattice mast

== Gallery ==
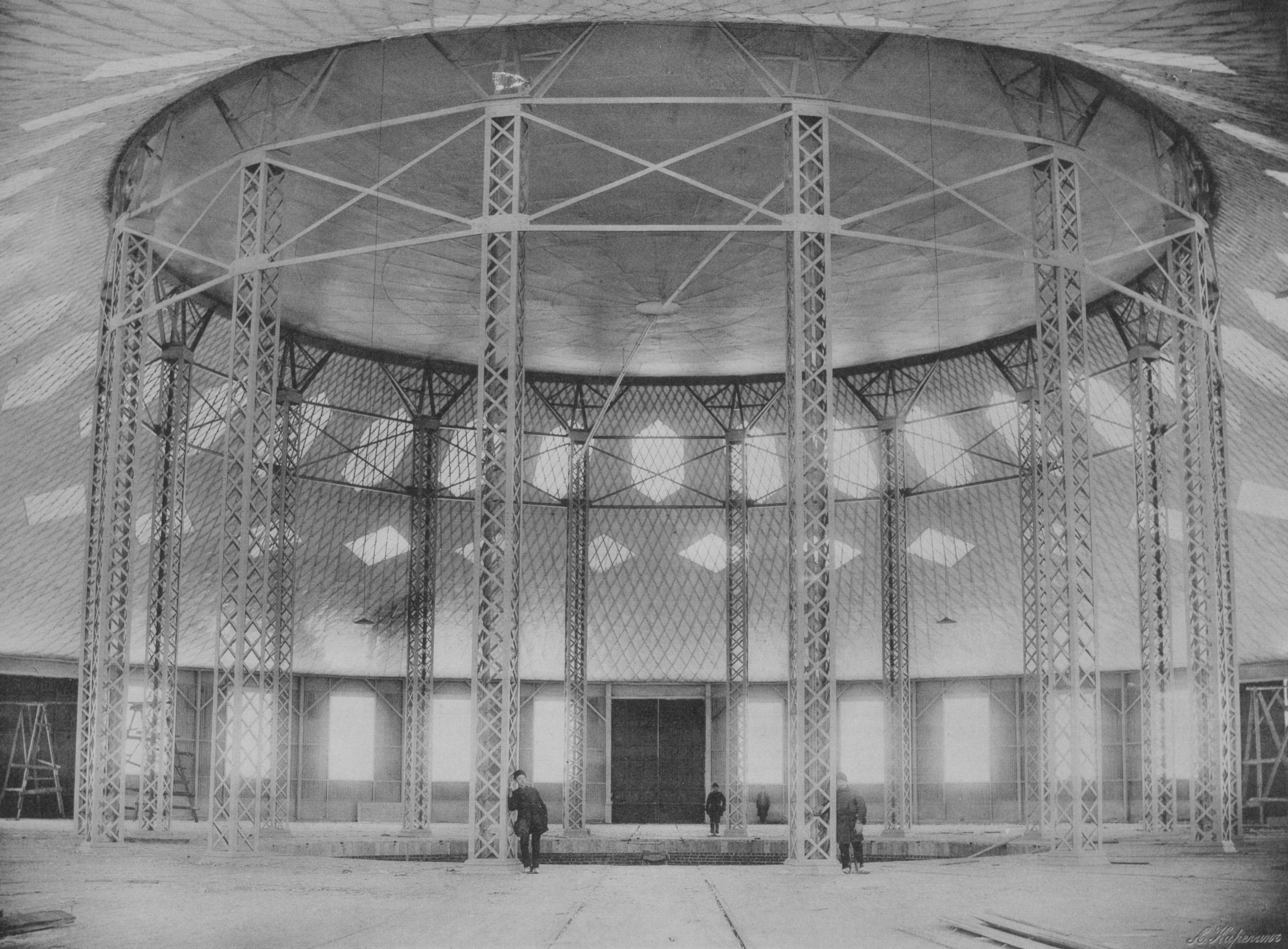
The World First Membrane roof and steel tensile gridshell in the Shukhov Rotunda, Nizhny Novgorod, 1895

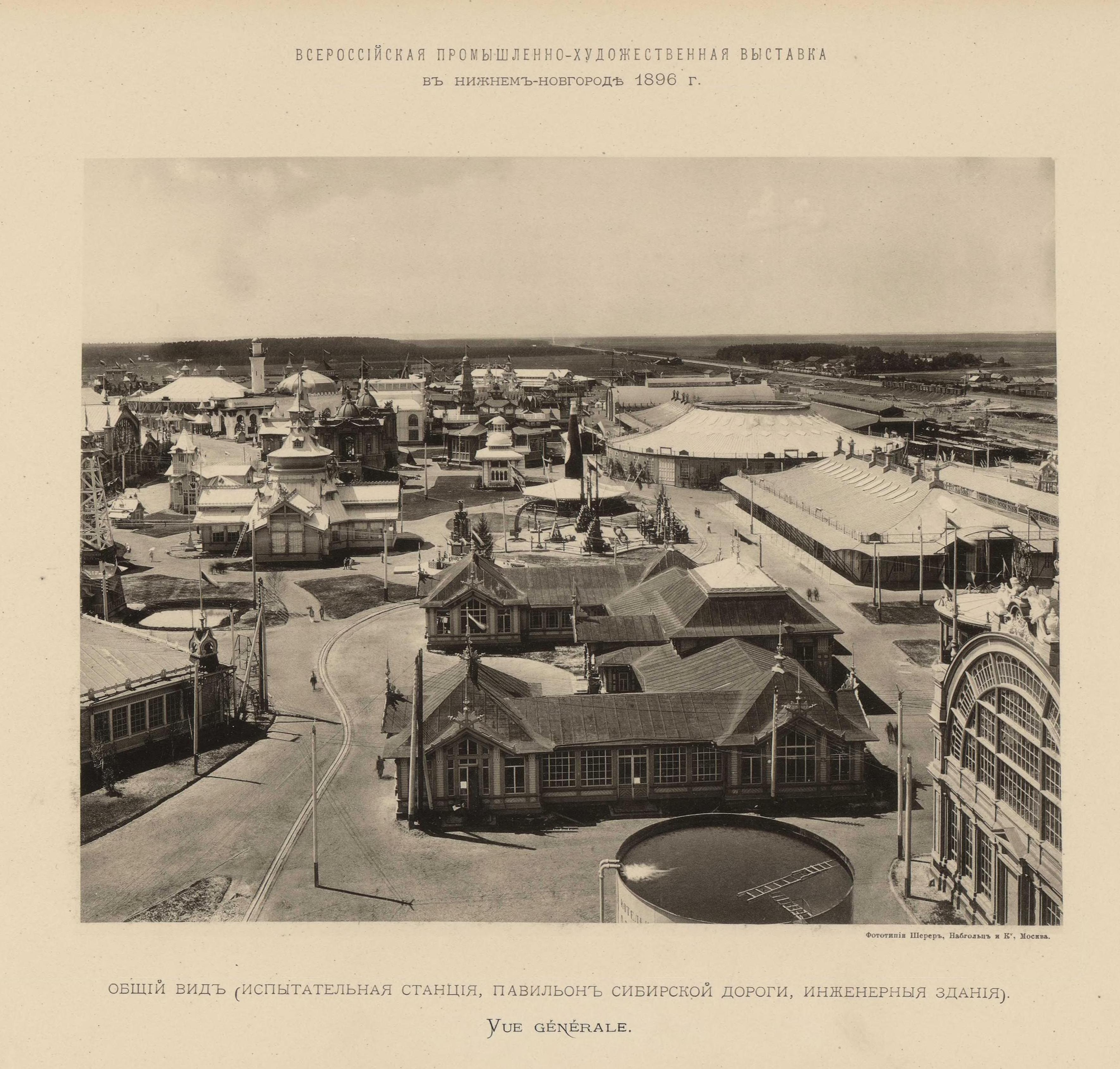
Rotunda and rectangular pavilion, Nizhny Novgorod, 1896

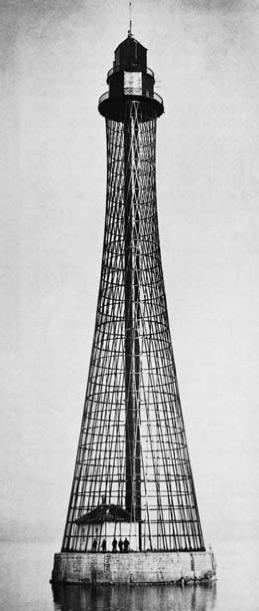
Hyperboloid Adziogol Lighthouse by V.G.Shukhov near Kherson, Ukraine, 1911

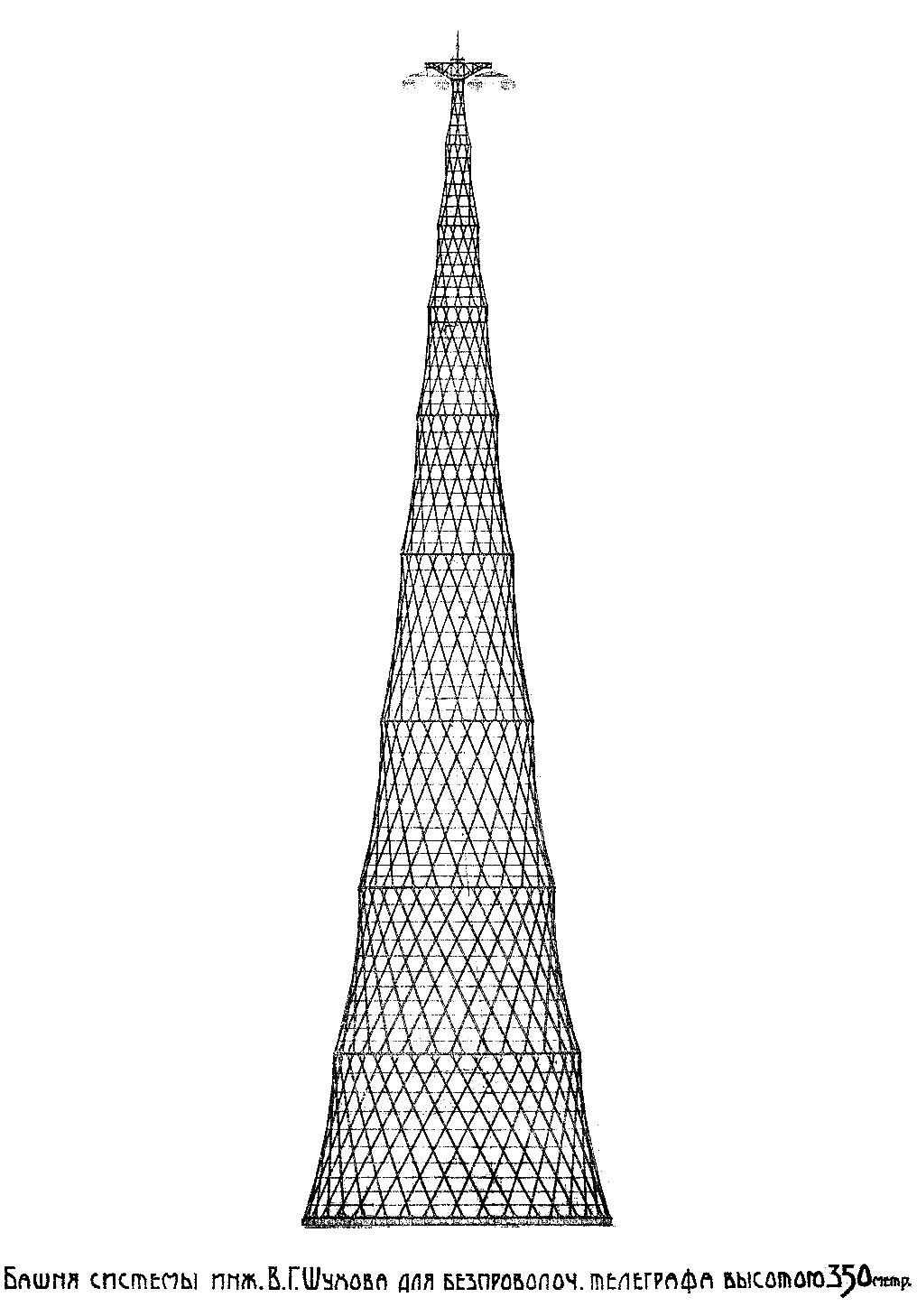
Shukhov Tower Project of 350 metres, 1919

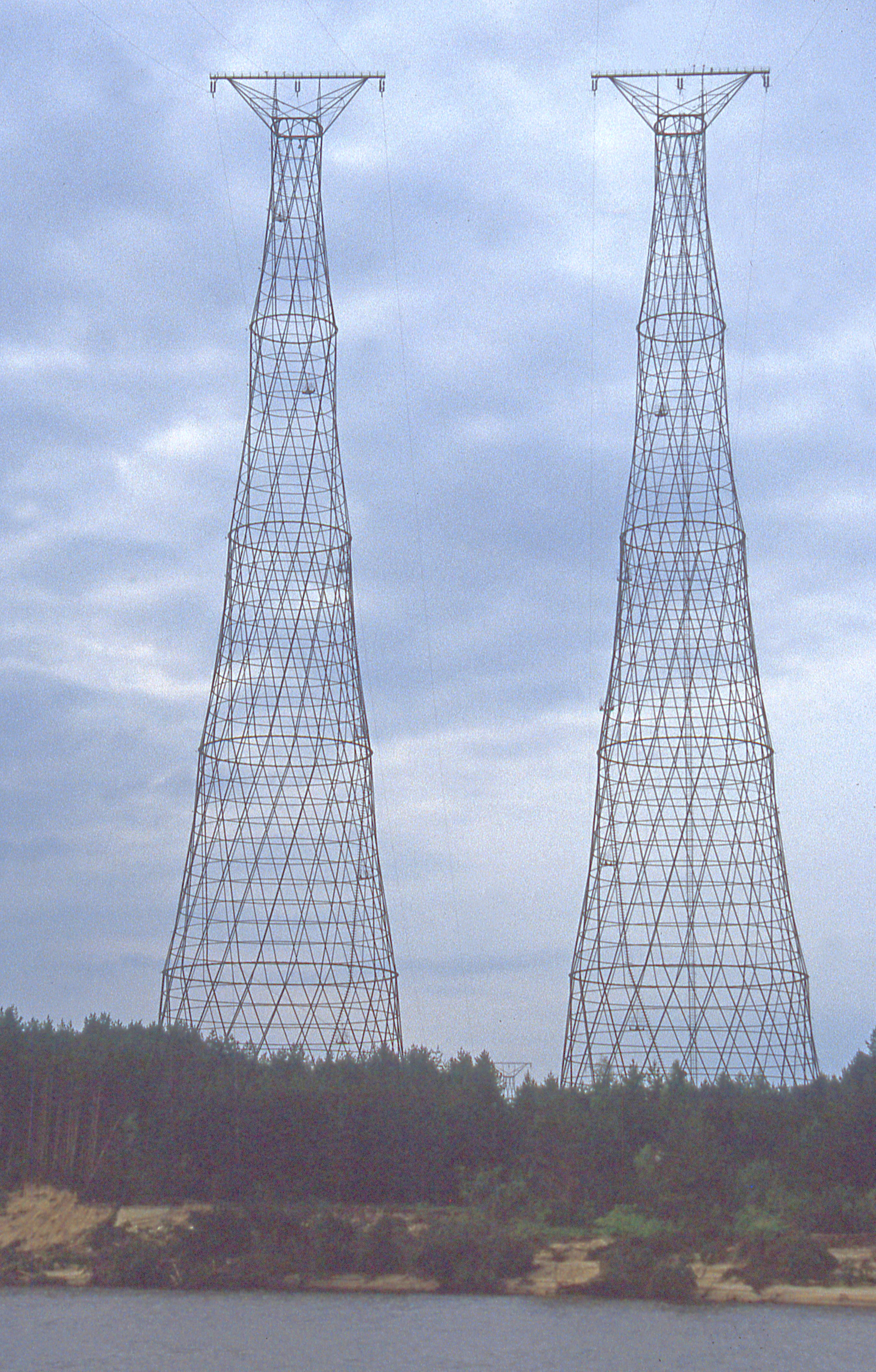
Shukhov towers on the Oka River, 1994

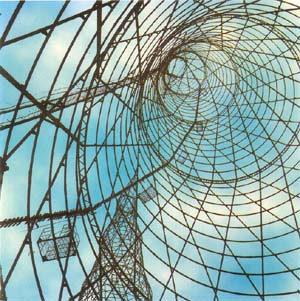
Shukhov towers on the Oka River in the suburb of Nizhniy Novgorod, 1988

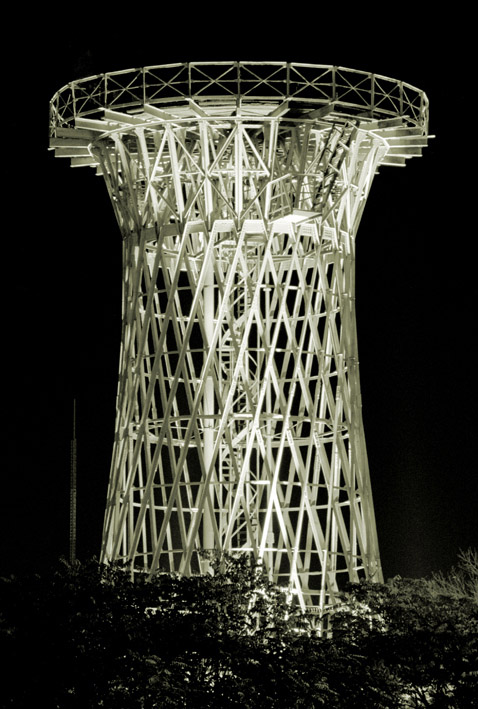
Shukhov tower in Krasnodar

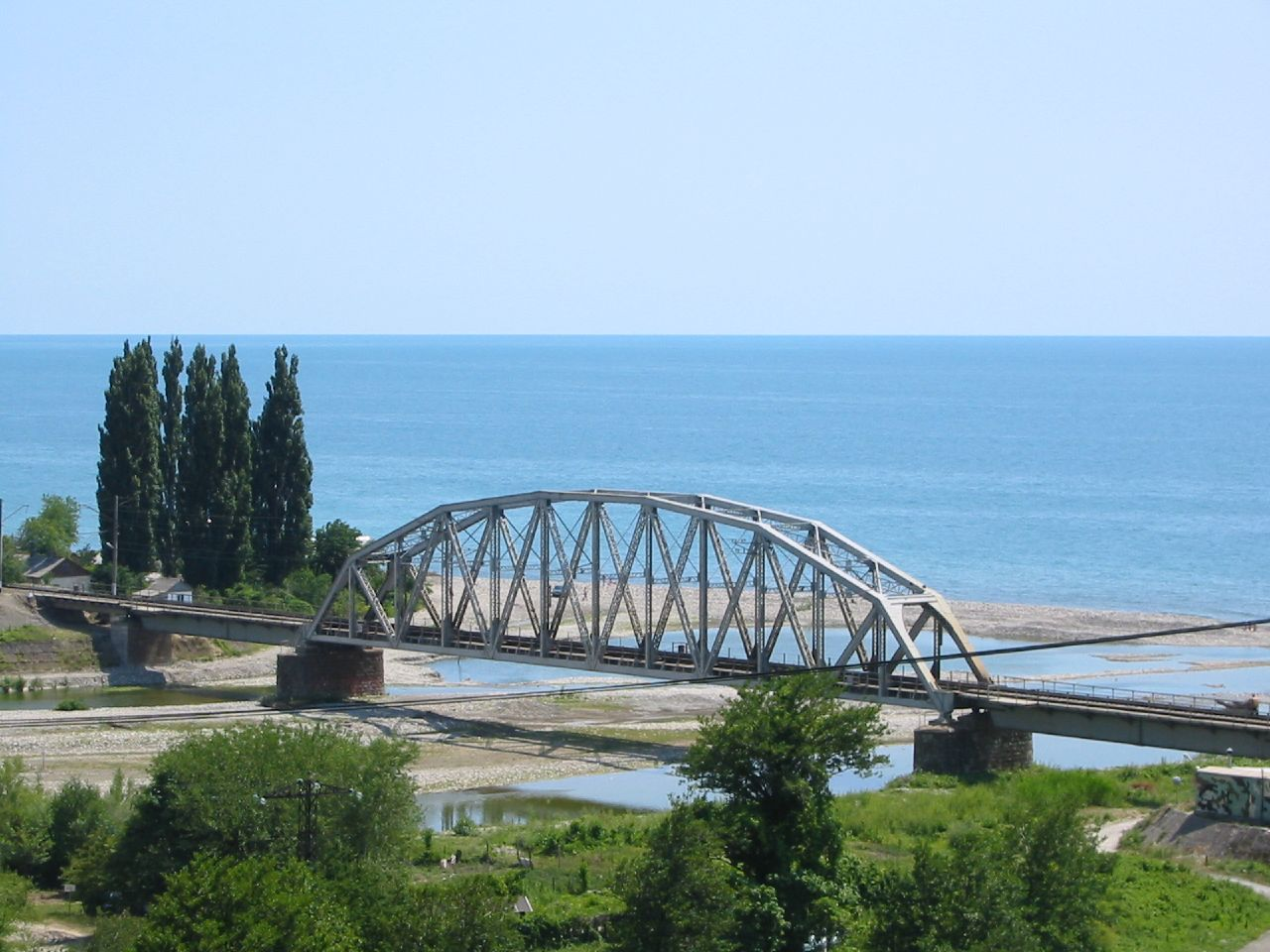
Shukhov bridge over Ashe river, near Sochi

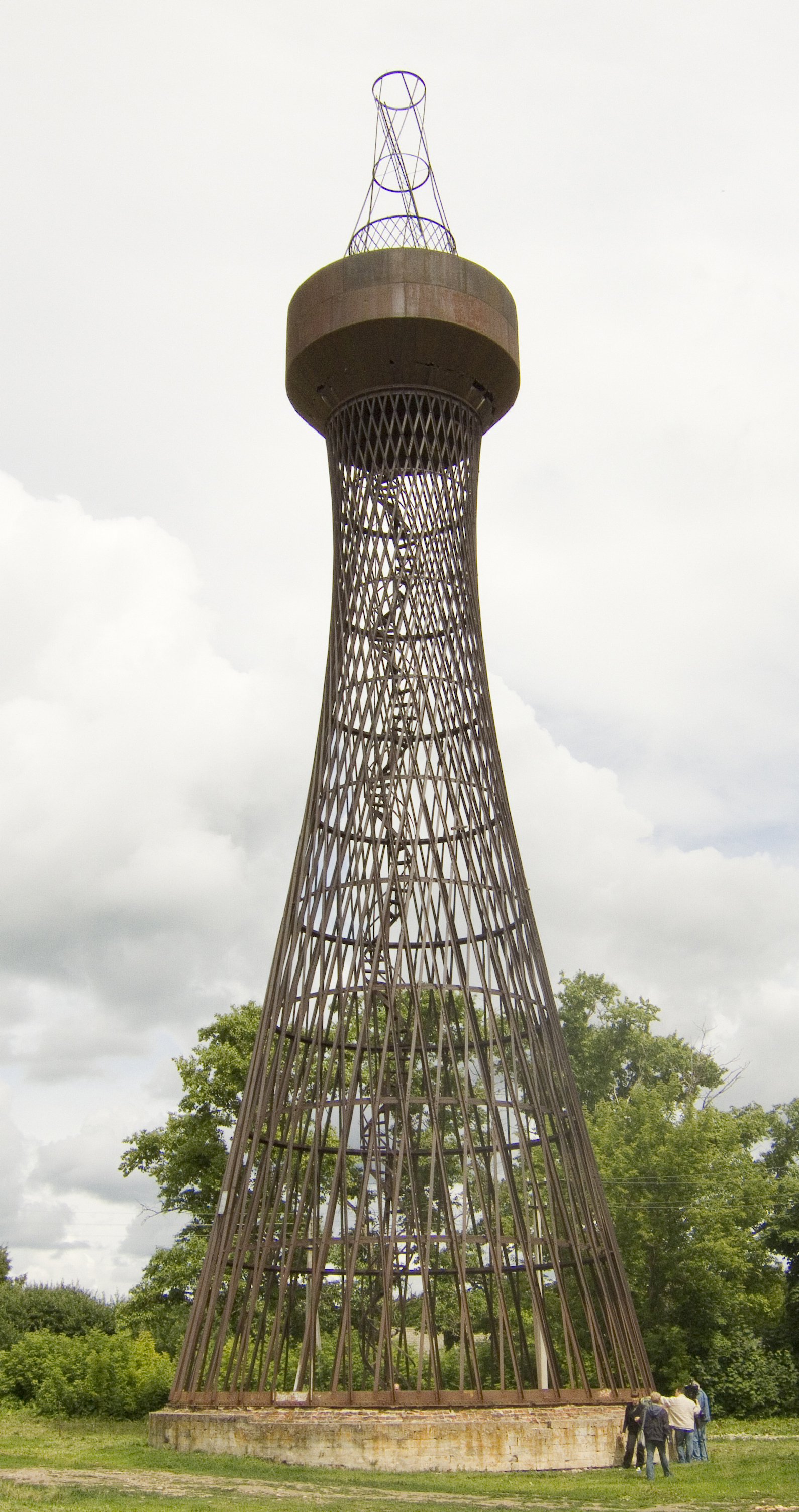
The world's first hyperboloid structure by Vladimir Shukhov, Polibino, Lipetsk Oblast, 2009

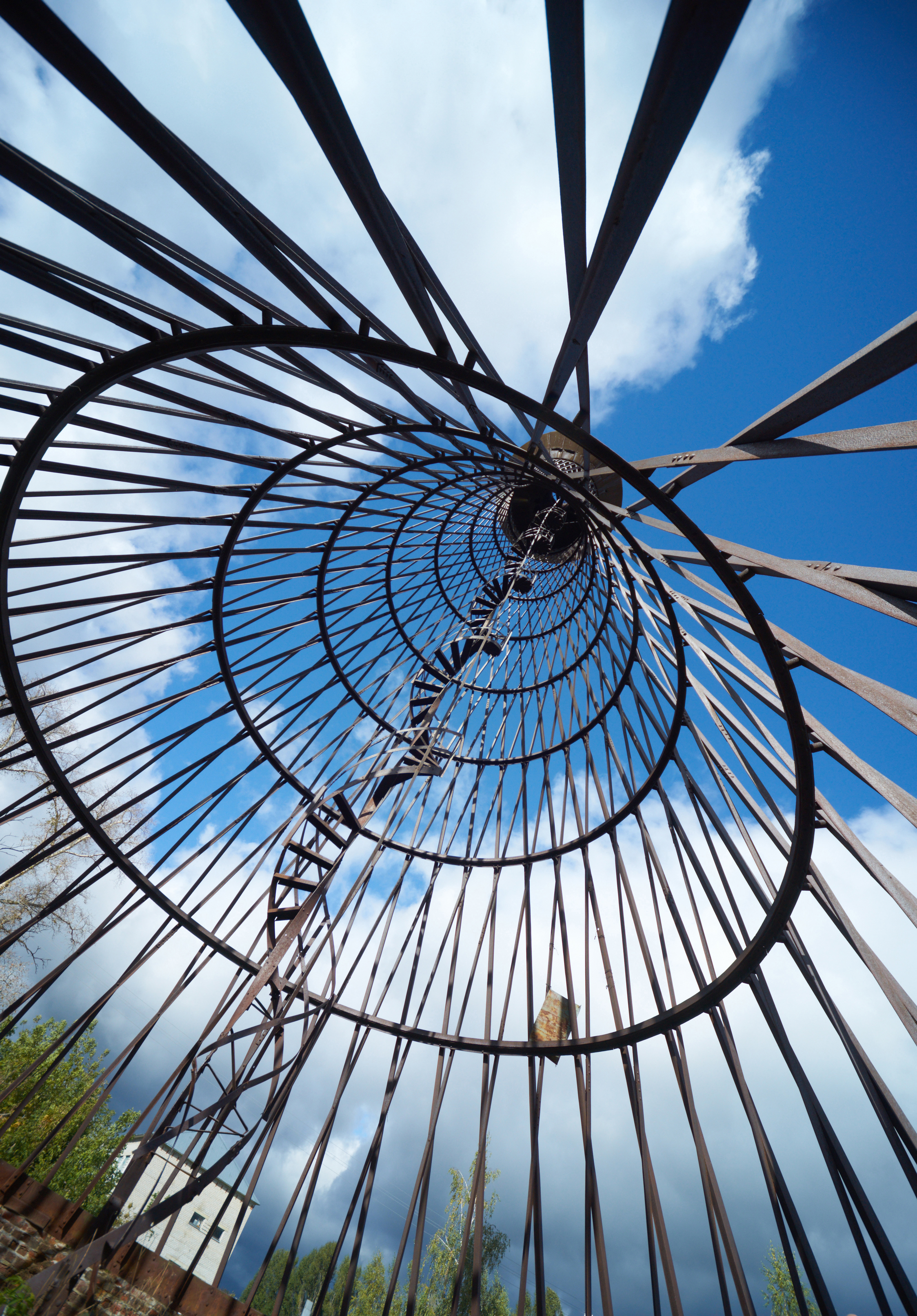
Diagrid hyperboloid structure of the world's first Shukhov Tower

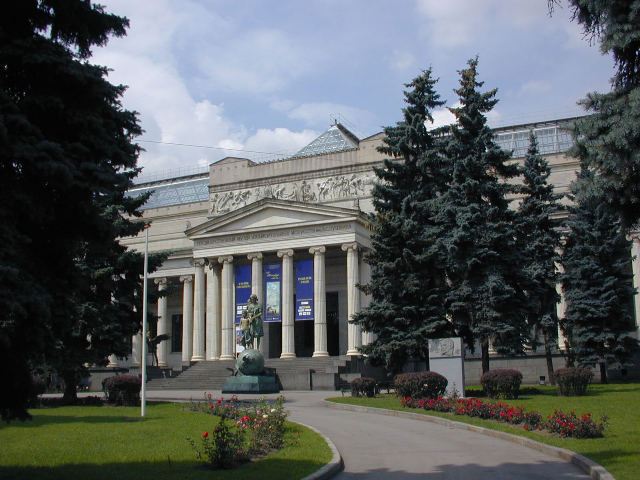
Pushkin Museum of Fine Arts, Moscow

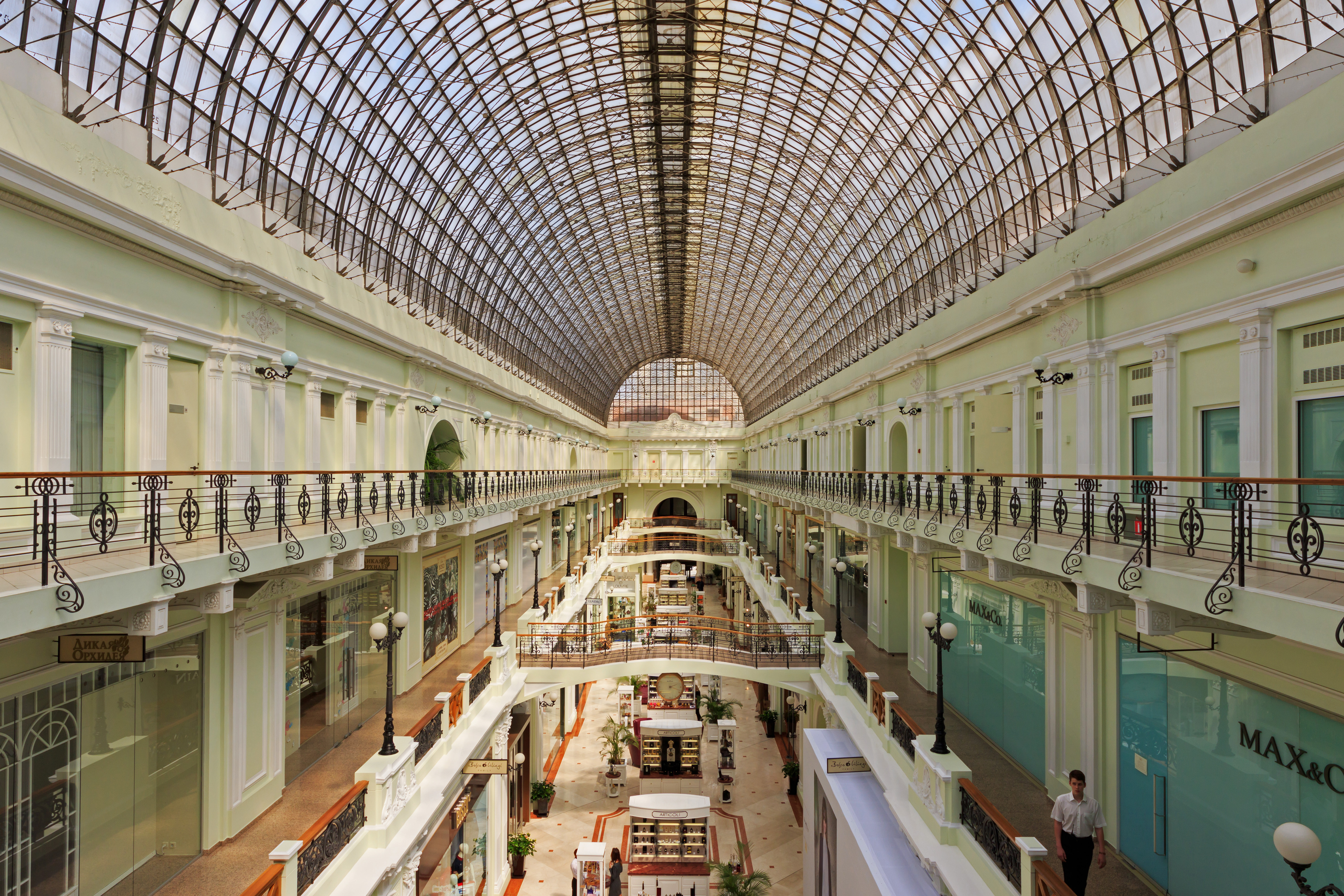
Petrovsky Passage

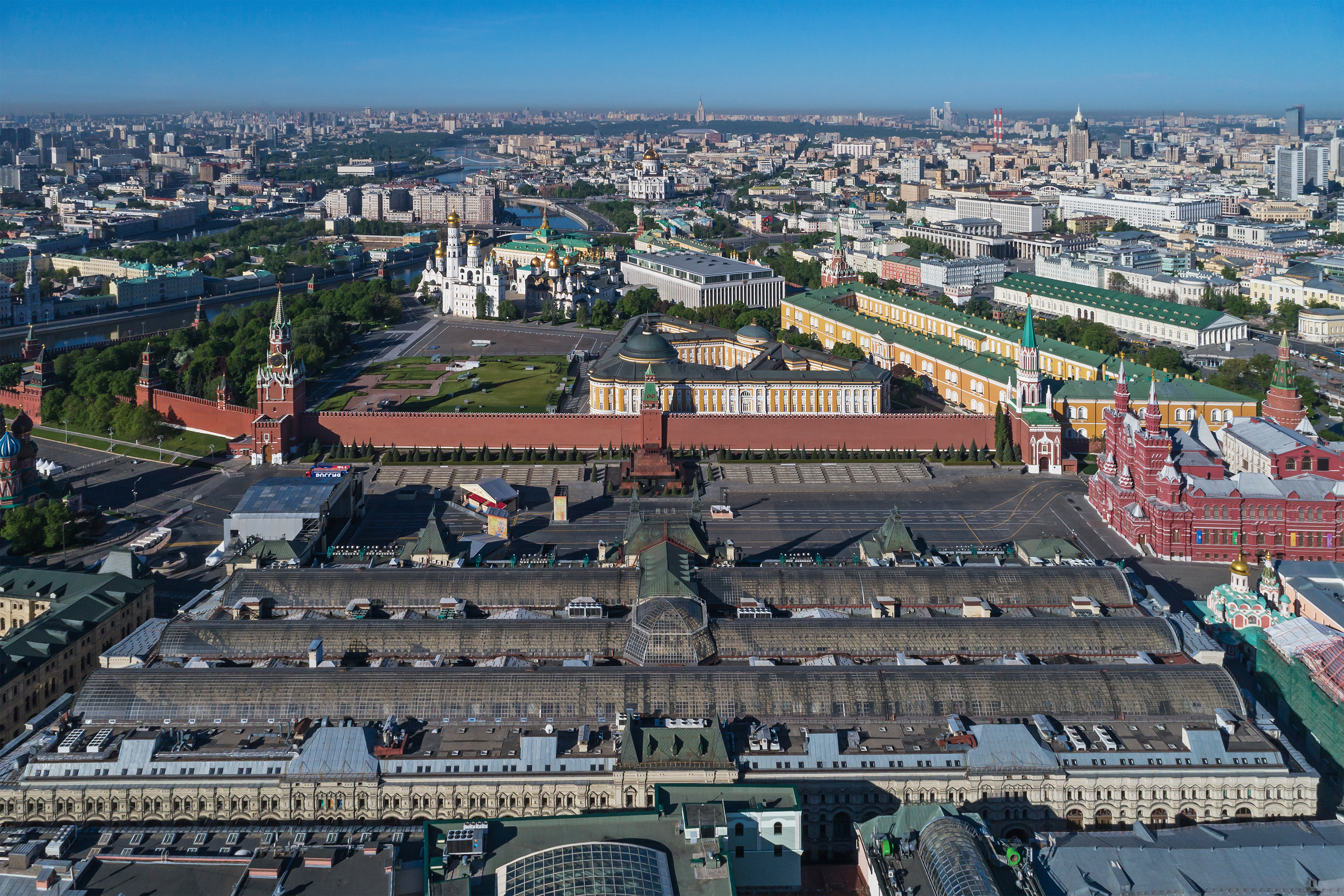
Roof of GUM, aerial view

== See also ==
- Shukhov cracking process
- Gridshell
- Diagrid
- Hyperboloid structure
- Tensile and membrane structures
- Constructivist architecture
- Pylons of Cádiz
- All-Russia exhibition 1896
- History of structural engineering
