= List of shipwrecks in June 1836 =

The list of shipwrecks in June 1836 includes ships sunk, foundered, wrecked, grounded, or otherwise lost during June 1836.

== 1 June ==
List of shipwrecks: 1 June 1836
Ship	State	Description
Messenger	United Kingdom	The ship caught fire at Saint John, New Brunswick, British North America and was scuttled.
Onega	United States	The ship departed from New York for Canton, China. Presumed subsequently foundered with the loss of all hands, a dressing box from the ship was picked up in the Irish Sea in August 1840.

== 2 June ==
List of shipwrecks: 2 June 1836
Ship	State	Description
Majestic	United States	The ship departed from Havre de Grâce, Seine-Inférieure, France for New York. No further trace, presumed foundered with the loss of all hands.
Sally Ann	United Kingdom	The ship ran aground on the Holme Sand, in the North Sea. She was on a voyage from Fowey, Cornwall to Hull, Yorkshire. Sally Ann was refloated on 4 June.

== 3 June ==
List of shipwrecks: 3 June 1836
Ship	State	Description
Astrea	United Kingdom	The ship caught fire and sank off the Sunk Lightship ( Trinity House). All on board were rescued. She was on a voyage from London to Hamburg.

== 4 June ==
List of shipwrecks: 4 June 1836
Ship	State	Description
Confidence	United Kingdom	The ship was driven ashore at Cape Cove. She was on a voyage from Saint John, New Brunswick, British North America to Baltimore, Maryland, United States.

== 5 June ==
List of shipwrecks: 5 June 1836
Ship	State	Description
Elizabeth Gillespie	United Kingdom	The ship sprang a leak and was beached at Stromness, Orkney Islands. She was on a voyage from Liverpool, Lancashire to Kronstadt, Russia.
Isabella	United Kingdom	The sloop foundered in St. Andrew's Bay. Her crew were rescued.
James Scott	United Kingdom	The ship collided with another vessel and was abandoned in the Atlantic Ocean. Her crew were rescued by Clorinde (France). She was on a voyage from Faro, Portugal to London. James Scott was towed in to Brest, Finistère, France on 5 July by Vėnus (French Navy).
Kitty	United Kingdom	The ship capsized in a squall at Wisbech, Cambridgeshire. She was refloated on 8 June.
Pantaloon	United Kingdom	The ship was lost at the mouth of the Cameroon River. Her crew were rescued. She was on a voyage from Africa to Liverpool.

== 6 June ==
List of shipwrecks: 6 June 1836
Ship	State	Description
Lerwick	United Kingdom	The ship was wrecked on the Gull Rock. All on board were rescued. She was on a voyage from St. John's, Ireland to Saint John, New Brunswick, British North America.
Lion	United Kingdom	The ship was driven ashore at Swansea, Glamorgan.
Swallow	United Kingdom	The ship was driven ashore near Barnegat, New Jersey, United States. She was on a voyage from Caernarfon to New York, United States. She was later refloated.

== 7 June ==
List of shipwrecks: 7 June 1836
Ship	State	Description
Dolphin	United Kingdom	The ship ran aground on Harry's Furlong, in the Irish Sea. She was on a voyage from Cork to Liverpool, Lancashire. Dolphin was refloated and beached at Wylfa, Anglesey.

== 8 June ==
List of shipwrecks: 8 June 1836
Ship	State	Description
Broughty Castle	United Kingdom	The brig was driven ashore and damaged at Dundee, Forfarshire. She was refloated the next day.

== 11 June ==
List of shipwrecks: 11 June 1836
Ship	State	Description
Palender	United States	The ship was lost at Smith's Point, Massachusetts. She was on a voyage from New York to Saint John, New Brunswick, British North America.
Temperance	United Kingdom	The ship was wrecked on Cape Sable Island, Nova Scotia, British North America. Her crew were rescued. She was on a voyage from Jamaica to Halifax, Nova Scotia.

== 13 June ==
List of shipwrecks: 13 June 1836
Ship	State	Description
Letitia Maria	United Kingdom	The ship was driven ashore at Maranhão, Brazil. She was on a voyage from Liverpool, Lancashire to Maranhão.

== 14 June ==
List of shipwrecks: 14 June 1836
Ship	State	Description
Skerne	United Kingdom	The ship ran aground in the Breede River, Africa. She was refloated in early July and taken in to Table Bay for repairs.
Zorgvuldigheid	Netherlands	The ship was driven ashore and wrecked at Mogadore, Morocco. She was on a voyage from Amsterdam, North Holland to Madeira and Surinam.

== 16 June ==
List of shipwrecks: 16 June 1836
Ship	State	Description
Palmer	United Kingdom	The ship sank at New York, United States.
William Osborne	United Kingdom	The ship was destroyed by fire at Apalachicola, Florida Territory.

== 19 June ==
List of shipwrecks: 16 June 1836
Ship	State	Description
Eddystone	United Kingdom	The ship grounded in the river at Newport, Wales, at the outset of a voyage to Savannah. It appeared her bottom might have been broken and she had to discharge and effect repairs.

== 20 June ==
List of shipwrecks: 20 June 1836
Ship	State	Description
Eligible	United Kingdom	The ship was lost off Bridgehampton, New York, United States. She was on a voyage from Pictou, Nova Scotia, British North America to New York City.

== 22 June ==
List of shipwrecks: 22 June 1836
Ship	State	Description
John and Mary	United Kingdom	The ship capsized in the Atlantic Ocean. Her ten crew were rescued on 28 June by Snowden and Wolfe's Cove (both United Kingdom). John and Mary was on a voyage from the Bay of Chaleur to Liverpool, Lancashire. She was towed in to Galway on 21 July.
Natches	United States	The brig was wrecked on the Florida Reef.
Rhine	Sweden	The ship was driven ashore on Long Island, New York, United States. She was on a voyage from Gothenburg to New York City. Rhine was refloated on 12 July.

== 24 June ==
List of shipwrecks: 24 June 1836
Ship	State	Description
Marie Therese	Netherlands	The ship struck the Hinder Bank, in the North Sea and consequently foundered off the coast of Zeeland. She was on a voyage from Batavia, Netherlands East Indies to Rotterdam, South Holland.

== 25 June ==
List of shipwrecks: 25 June 1836
Ship	State	Description
Choctaw	United States	The ship was driven ashore and wrecked at New Orleans, Louisiana. She was on a voyage from New Orleans to Havre de Grâce, Seine-Inférieure, France. Choctaw was later refloated and beached. She was subsequently taken in to New Orleans for repairs.
Gloucester	United States	The ship was driven ashore and wrecked at New Orleans. She was on a voyage from New Orleans to Cowes, Isle of Wight, United Kingdom.
Mary	United Kingdom	The ship struck the pier and sank at Sunderland, County Durham.

== 27 June ==
List of shipwrecks: 27 June 1836
Ship	State	Description
Sago	Portugal	The ship was destroyed by fire at Trieste.

== 28 June ==
List of shipwrecks: 28 June 1836
Ship	State	Description
Lady Douglas	United Kingdom	The ship ran aground and sank at Maryport, Cumberland. She was on a voyage from Sierra Leone to Maryport.

== 29 June ==
List of shipwrecks: 29 June 1836
Ship	State	Description
Minerva	United Kingdom	The ship sprang a leak and was abandoned in the Atlantic Ocean. Her crew were rescued. She was on a voyage from Cádiz, Spain to Newfoundland, British North America.
Zebulon	United Kingdom	The ship was wrecked in the Magdalen Islands, Nova Scotia, British North America. Her crew survived. She was on a voyage from Richibucto, New Brunswick to Liverpool, Lancashire.

== 30 June ==
List of shipwrecks: 30 June 1836
Ship	State	Description
Chayka (Чайка, 'Seagull')	Imperial Russian Navy	The transport ship ran aground in Vuzka Bay in the Black Sea with the loss of one life. She was on a voyage from Sevastopol to the Tarkhankut Lighthouse. Her hull was subsequently sold.
Matomoras	United Kingdom	The ship was wrecked at "Tobasco". Her crew were rescued. She was on a voyage from Liverpool, Lancashire to "Tobasco".

== Unknown date ==
List of shipwrecks: Unknown date in June 1836
Ship	State	Description
Attakapos	United States	The ship was wrecked at Tampico, Mexico. She was on a voyage from New Orleans, Louisiana to Tampico.
Bon Accord	United Kingdom	The ship ran aground in the White Sea.
Caroline	United Kingdom	The ship collided with Superior (United Kingdom) and was abandoned by her crew. She was on a voyage from Saint John, New Brunswick, British North America to New York, United States.
Concordia	Netherlands	The ship sprang a leak and was abandoned in the North Sea off Schouwen-Duiveland, Zeeland. Her crew were rescued by Vrow Elizabeth (Netherlands).
Duke of Kent	United Kingdom	The ship was wrecked in the South Esk River, Van Diemen's Land before 11 June.
Elizabeth	United Kingdom	The ship was driven ashore in the Gambia River and was consequently condemned.
James Scott	United Kingdom	The ship was abandoned in the Atlantic Ocean before 18 June.
Judal Kareen	Netherlands	The East Indiaman was wrecked 25 nautical miles (46 km) off the Kangean Islands, Spanish East Indies with the loss of 246 of the 309 people on board. She was on a voyage from Sourabaya to Amboyna.
Kingston	United Kingdom	The ship departed from Calcutta, India for Llanelly, Glamorgan. No further trace, presumed foundered with the loss of all hands.
Maria	(United Kingdom of Great Britain and Ireland) New South Wales	The whaler was wrecked off Cape Pillar, Van Diemen's Land on or before 8 June.
Marié Therese	Netherlands	The ship struck the Hindon Bank and foundered in the Goree Channel, off the coast of Zeeland. She was on a voyage from Batavia, Netherlands East Indies to Rotterdam, South Holland.
Matilda	United Kingdom	The ship was driven ashore on the Rojasas before 4 June. She was on a voyage from St. Thomas, Virgin Islands to La Guayra, Venezuela.
Prudent	United Kingdom	The ship was driven ashore at "Abiscar". She was later refloated and put into New York.
Sarah Jane	(United Kingdom of Great Britain and Ireland) New South Wales	The schooner was wrecked at Port Fairy.
