= Adziogol Lighthouse =

Lighthouse in Kherson Oblast, Ukraine

Stanislav-Adziogol Lighthouse
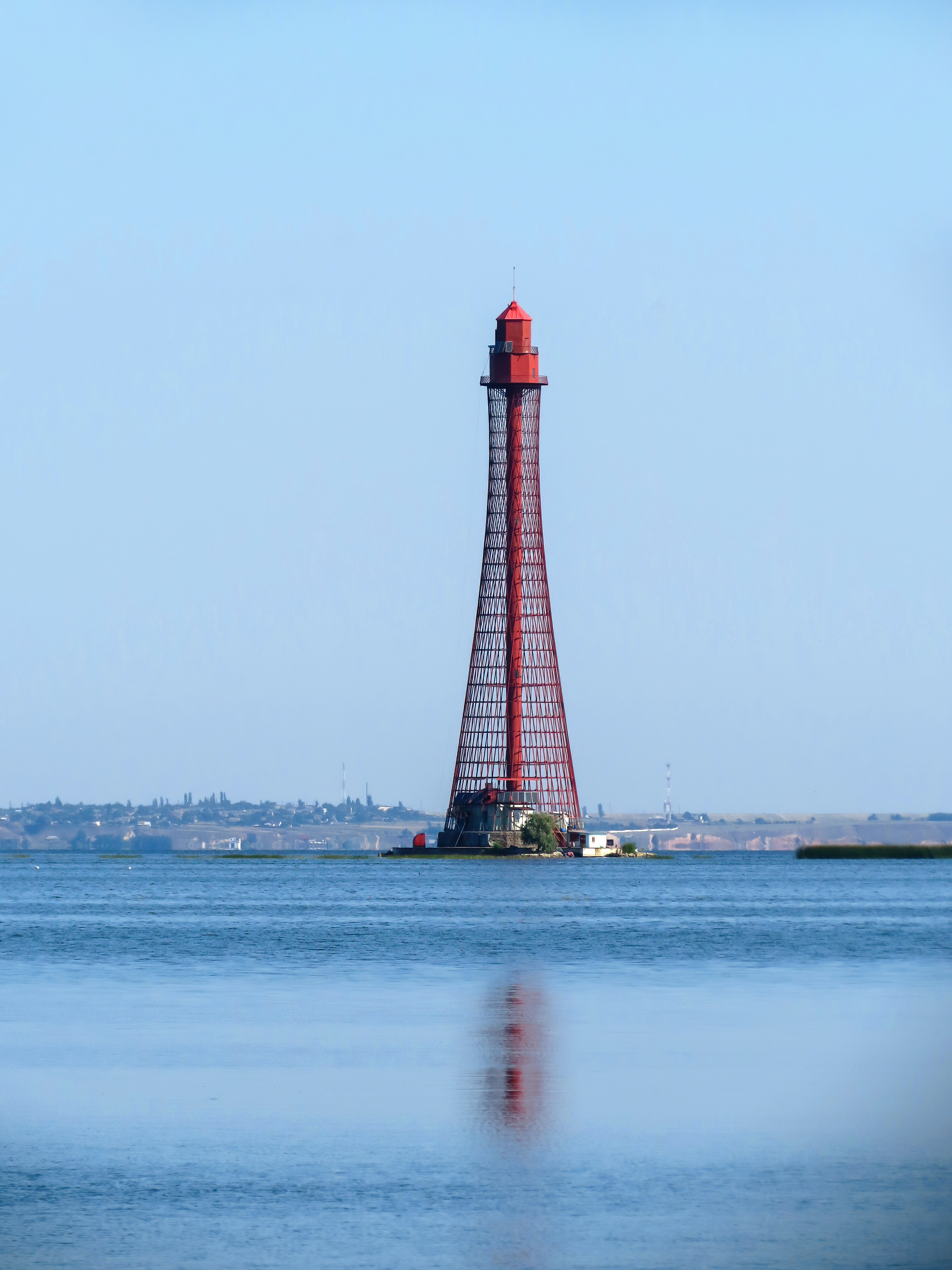
- Location: Kherson Oblast; Ukraine
- Coordinates: 46°29′32.54″N 32°13′57.35″E

Tower
- Constructed: 1911
- Foundation: concrete base
- Construction: skeletal steel
- Height: 211 feet (64 m)
- Shape: circular hyperboloid tower with central cylinder, double balcony and lantern
- Markings: red tower
- Operator: Derzhhydrohrafiya

Light
- Focal height: 221 feet (67 m)
- Range: 19 nautical miles (35 km; 22 mi)
- Characteristic: F W on request, visible only on range line
- Ukraine no.: UA-1001

The Adziogol Lighthouse (Ukrainian: Аджигольський маяк), also known as Stanislav–Adzhyhol Lighthouse or Stanislav Range Rear light, is one of two vertical lattice hyperboloid structures of steel bars, serving as active lighthouses in Dnieper Estuary, Ukraine. It is located about 30 km (19 mi) west of the city of Kherson. At a height of 211 feet (64 m), it is the sixteenth-tallest "traditional lighthouse" in the world as well as the tallest in Ukraine.

== Location ==
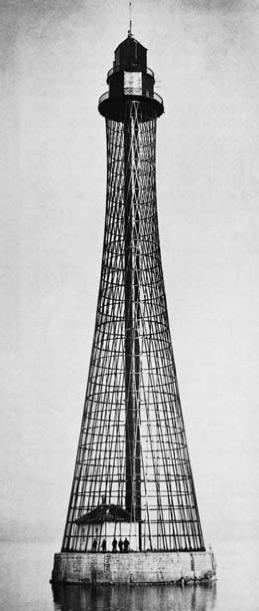
Adziogol Lighthouse in 1911

It is located on a concrete pier on a tiny islet in the combined Dnieper-Bug Estuary, which extends eastward into the Dnieper Estuary, a part of the Dnieper River delta, about 2.5 km (1.6 mi) north of the village of Rybalche (Skadovsk Raion) and south of the Cape of Adzhyhol, for which it is named. Together with the Stanislav Range Front Light (Small Adzhyhol Lighthouse), it serves as a range light, guiding ships entering the Dnieper River or the Southern Buh River within the vast Dnieper-Bug Estuary.

== Details ==
The lighthouse was designed in 1910 and built in 1911 by Vladimir Shukhov. The one-story keeper's house sits inside the base of the tower.

The site of the tower is accessible only by boat. The site is open to the public but the tower is closed.

On 22 July 2022, the lighthouse was damaged by a Russian missile attack; 3 rockets hit the lighthouse.

== See also ==
- List of lighthouses in Ukraine
- Thin-shell structure
- List of hyperboloid structures
- List of thin shell structures
- List of tallest lighthouses in the world
