= Vorontsov Lighthouse =

Vorontsov Lighthouse Odesa Range Front
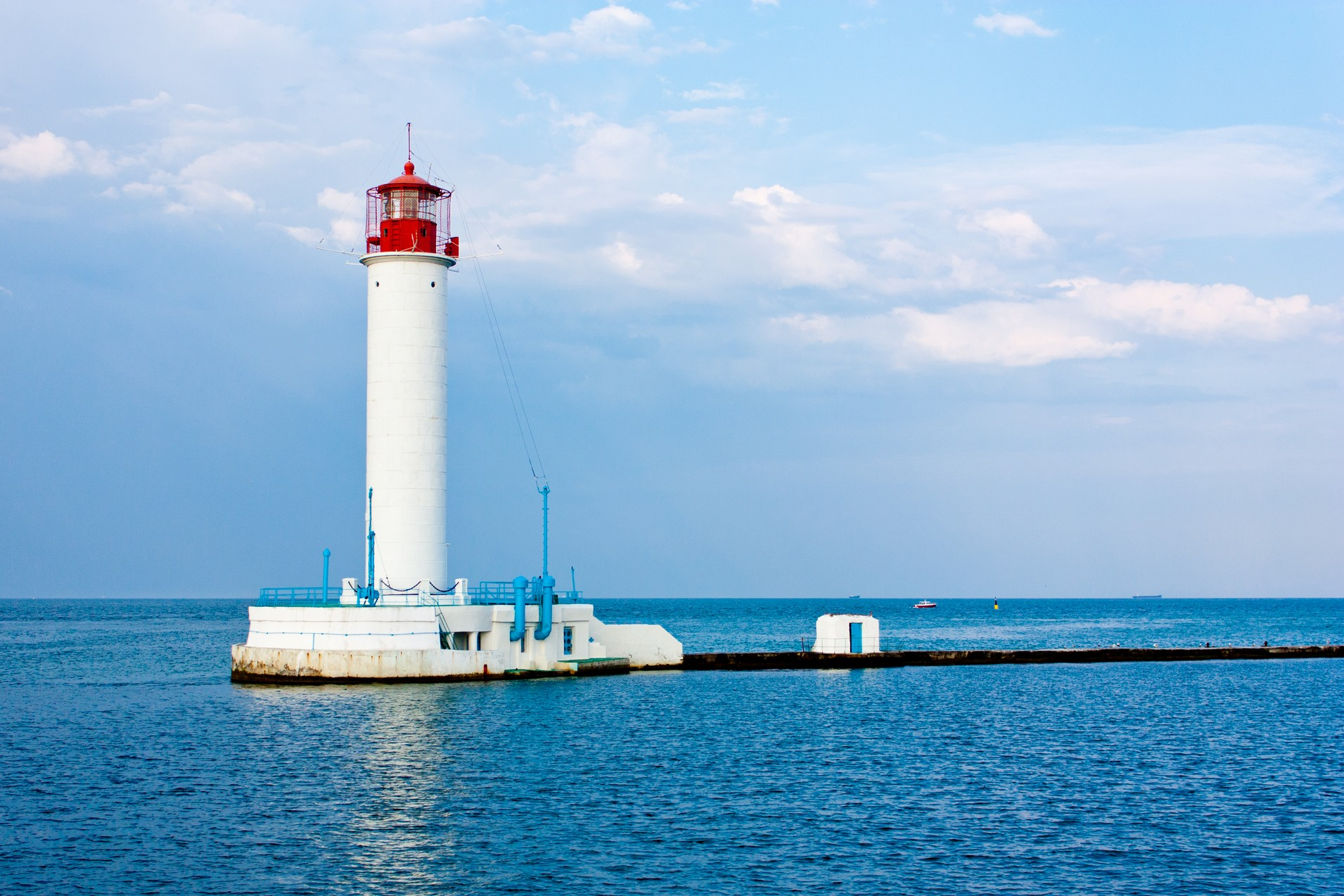
- New Vorontsov Lighthouse (2013)
- Location: Odesa; Ukraine
- Coordinates: 46°29′48″N 30°45′36″E

Tower
- Constructed: 1888 (first)
- Construction: cast iron tower
- Height: 26 metres (85 ft)
- Shape: cylindrical tower with balcony and lantern
- Markings: white tower, red lantern
- Operator: Gosgidrografiya
- Heritage: architectural monument of local significance of Ukraine

Light
- First lit: 1955 (current)
- Focal height: 27 metres (89 ft)
- Characteristic: Fl (3) R 12s.
- Ukraine no.: UA-0340

Immovable Monument of Local Significance of Ukraine
- Official name: Воронцовський маяк (Vorontsov Lighthouse)
- Type: Architecture, Urban Planning
- Reference no.: 561-Од

The Vorontsov Lighthouse (Ukrainian: Воронцовський маяк, romanized: Vorontsovskyi maiak, Russian: Воронцовский маяк) is a red-and-white, 27.2-metre-tall (89 ft) lighthouse in the Black Sea port of Odesa, Ukraine. It is named after Prince Mikhail Semyonovich Vorontsov, one of the governors-general of the Odesa region.

== Construction ==
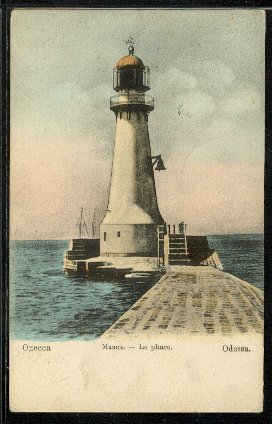
Old Vorontsov Lighthouse

The lighthouse was built with iron tubing and lead gaskets. It has a one-million-watt signal light that can be seen up to twelve nautical miles (22 km) away. It transmits the Morse Code signal of three dashes, the letter O, for Odesa. It also sounds a foghorn during severe storms or fog.

The lighthouse is connected with the port's shoreline by a long stone causeway and jetty, which protect the port from the southern high seas. The port is protected on the east by huge concrete breakwaters built on rocks, that rise above the water.

== History ==
The current lighthouse is the third to stand on the same spot. The first was built in 1862 and was made of wood.

== See also ==
- List of lighthouses in Ukraine
