= List of thin-shell structures =

Thin-shell structures are lightweight constructions using shell elements.

== Notable projects ==
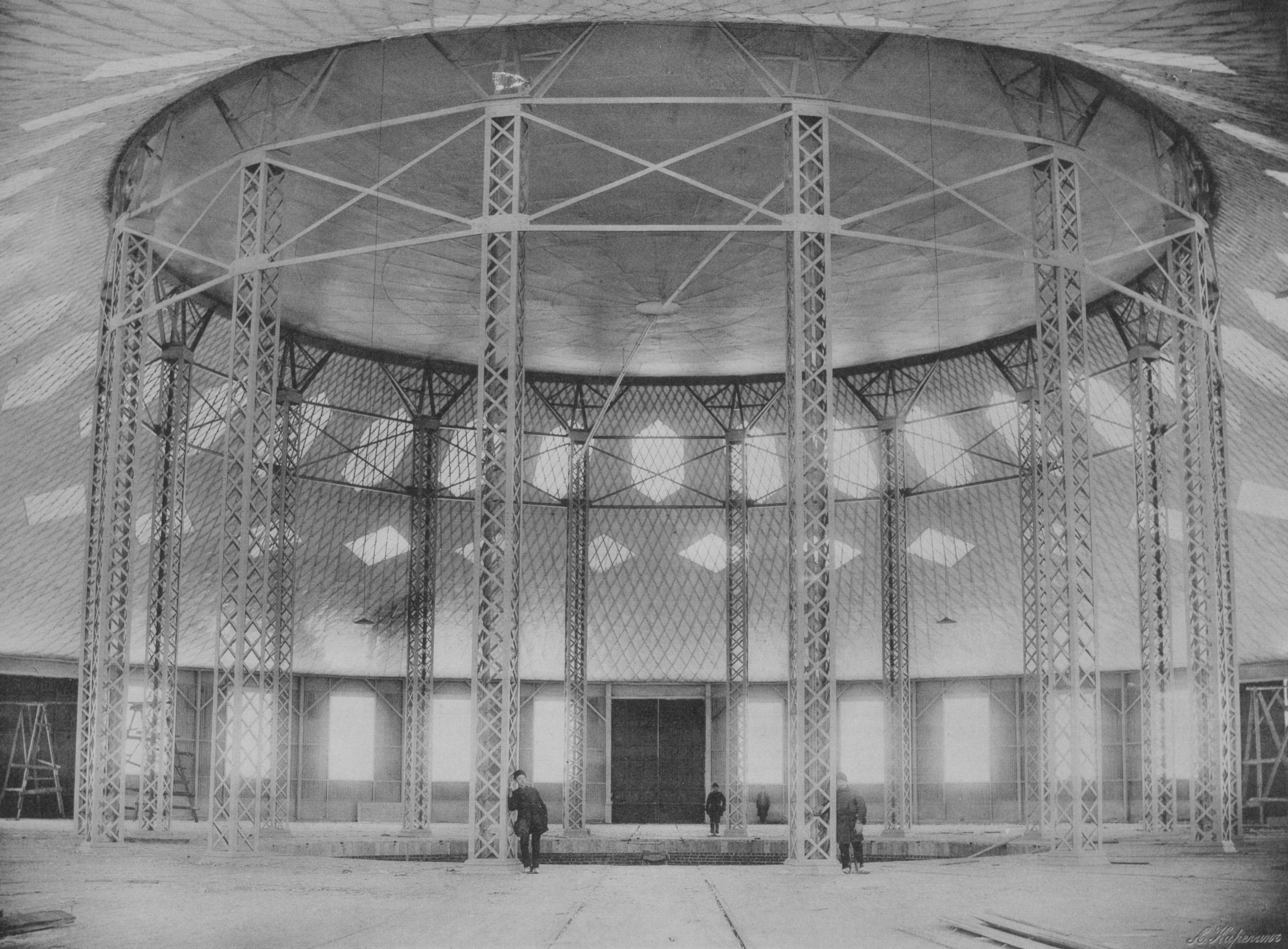
The world's first membrane roof and lattice steel shell in the Shukhov Rotunda, Nizhny Novgorod, All-Russia exhibition, 1895

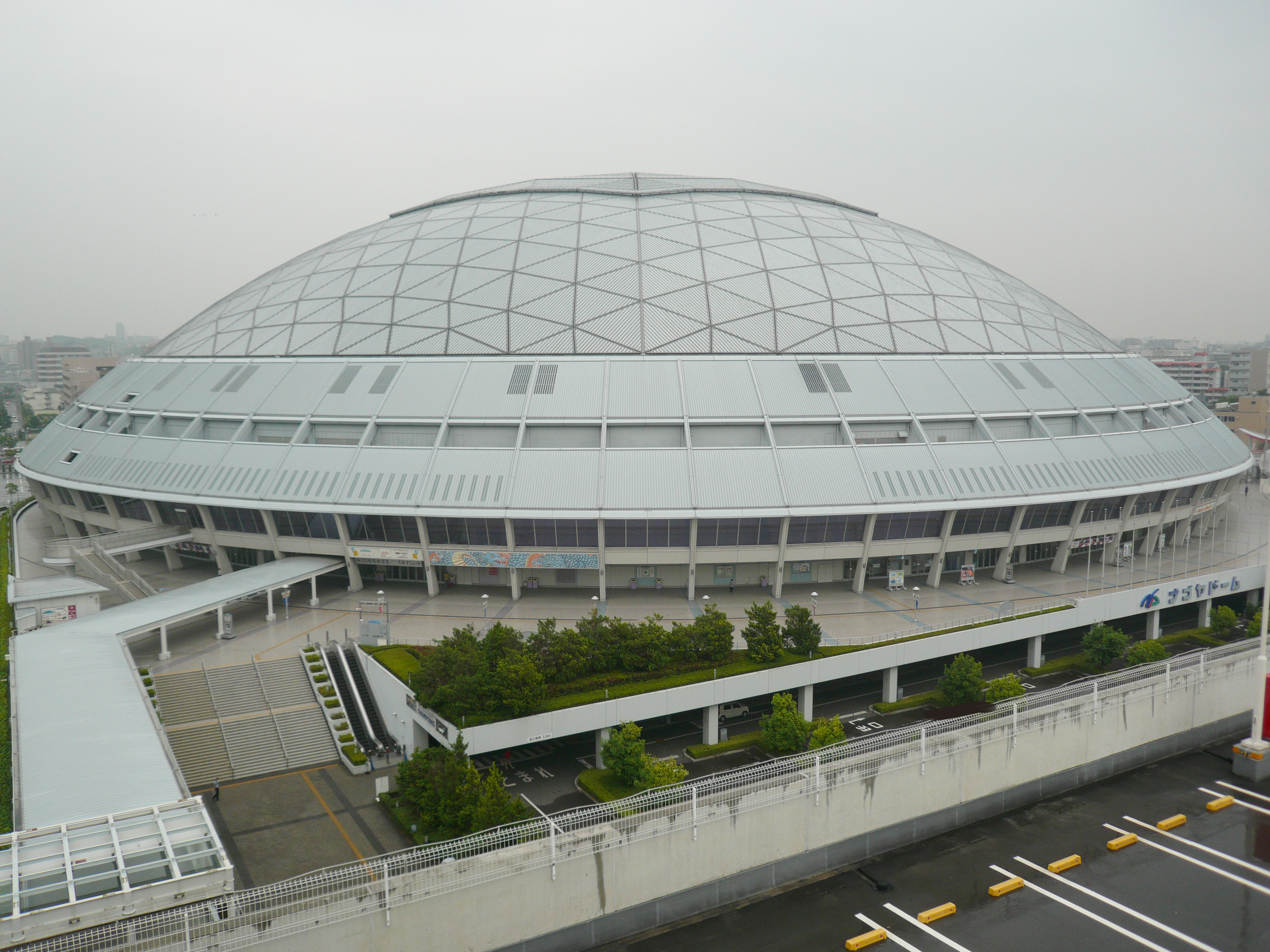
Geodesic shell of Nagoya Dome by Takenaka Corporation, Nagoya, Japan, 1997.

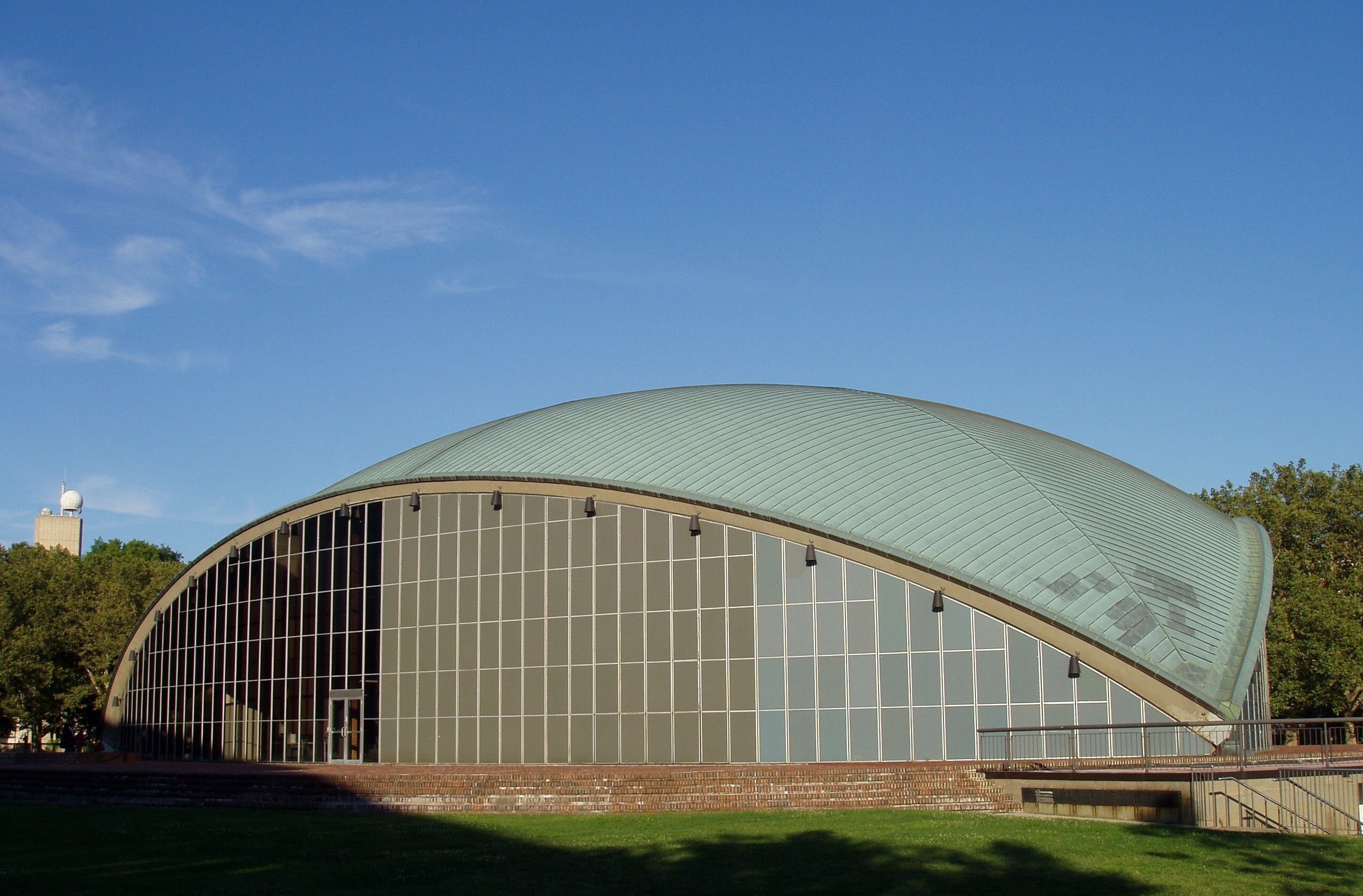
Shell of Kresge Auditorium by Eero Saarinen, MIT, Cambridge, Massachusetts, 1953.

=== Asia/Pacific ===
- Nagoya Dome, Nagoya, Japan
- Parish of the Holy Sacrifice at the University of the Philippines Diliman, Quezon City, Philippines
- Putrajaya Convention Centre, Putrajaya, Malaysia
- Sydney Opera House, Sydney, Australia
- Tokyo Dome, Tokyo, Japan
- Tower Infinity, Seoul, South Korea

=== Europe ===
- Adziogol Lighthouse, Kherson Oblast, Ukraine
- Aquatoll, Neckarsulm, Germany
- Berlin Main Station, Berlin, Germany
- Dortmund Opera House, Dortmund, Germany
- Dos Hermanas Velodrome, Dos Hermanas, Spain
- Eden Project, Cornwall, England
- Espace des Inventions, Swiss national exposition of 1964, Lausanne, Switzerland
- Europe 1 Transmitter Building, Felsberg-Berus, Germany
- Haus der Kulturen der Welt, Berlin, Germany
- Imperial War Museum, Duxford, England
- Parabolic steel-and-glass roof of the Kiyevsky railway station, Moscow, Russia
- Korkeasaari Lookout Tower, Helsinki, Finland
- L'Oceanogràfic at the City of Arts and Sciences, Valencia, Spain
- Lotus Sculpture at the Goodwood Festival of Speed, UK
- Milan Trade Fair, Milan, Italy
- Palau Guell, Barcelona, Spain
- Philips Pavilion at the Expo '58, Brussels, Belgium
- Pylons of Cadiz, Cadiz, Spain
- Queen Elizabeth II Great Court of the British Museum, London, England
- Sagrada Familia, Barcelona, Spain
- Shukhov's Rotunda at the All-Russia exhibition, Nizhny Novgorod, Russia
- Shukhov Tower, Moscow, Russia
- Stanislav Range Front Light, Kherson Oblast, Ukraine
- Swiss Air Force Museum, Zurich, Switzerland
- Weald and Downland Gridshell at the Weald and Downland Open Air Museum, Chichester, England
- Zeiss-Planetarium, Jena, Germany
- Norwich Sports Village, Norwich, UK

=== North America ===
- Centre Pierre Charbonneau, Montréal, Canada
- Dorton Arena, North Carolina, US
- Ingalls Rink at Yale University, Connecticut, US
- Kresge Auditorium, Massachusetts, US
- Lambert-St. Louis International Airport, Missouri, US
- Main Terminal of Washington Dulles International Airport, Virginia, US
- McDonnell Planetarium at the St. Louis Science Center, Missouri, US
- Montreal Biosphère, Montreal, Canada
- Payson Athletic Center, Arizona, US
- Scotiabank Saddledome, Alberta, Canada
- Spaceship Earth at Disney World, Florida, US
- TWA Flight Center of John F. Kennedy International Airport, New York, US
