= List of lighthouses in Ukraine =

This is a list of lighthouses in Ukraine. All lighthouses are controlled by the Ukrainian state institution Derzhhidrohrafiya. There are over 100 lighthouses in Ukraine, five of them (all in Crimea) were taken over by Russia during the 2014 Russian intervention in Ukraine.

The Derzhhidrohrafiya (State Hydrographic Service of Ukraine) divides its area of responsibilities over the lighthouses into several districts (raions). There are four existing raions, operations two of which is temporarily suspended. In 2017 there was an additional raion created along Dnieper, Dnieper Raion.

== Lighthouses ==
=== Odesa region ===
Name	Image	Water body	Location	Year	ARLHS code	Notes
Snake Island Lighthouse		Black Sea	Snake Island, Odesa Oblast	1843	UKR-050	
Dniester-Tsargrad Lighthouse		Black Sea	Bilhorod-Dnistrovskyi, Odesa Oblast	1851		
Sanzhyika Lighthouse		Black Sea	Sanzhyika, Odesa Oblast	1921	UKR-028	
Shahany Lighthouse		Black Sea	Ust-Dunaisk, Odesa Oblast	1983		
Budaky Lighthouse		Black Sea	Bilhorod-Dnistrovskyi, Odesa Oblast	1851		
Illichivsk Lighthouse		Black Sea	Chornomorsk, Odesa Oblast	1965		
Odesa Lighthouse		Black Sea	Odesa, Odesa Oblast	1827		
Vorontsov Lighthouse		Black Sea	Odesa, Odesa Oblast	1845		
Luzanivka Lighthouse		Black Sea	Odesa, Odesa Oblast	1979		
Hryhorivka Lighthouse		Black Sea	Odesa, Odesa Oblast	1986		
Karabush Lighthouse		Black Sea	Odesa, Odesa Oblast	1983		

=== Mykolaiv region ===
Name	Image	Water body	Location	Year	ARLHS code	Notes
Front Siversov Lighthouse		Southern Bug	Siversova sandbar, Mykolaiv Oblast	1866		
Rear Siversov Lighthouse		Southern Bug	Siversova sandbar, Mykolaiv Oblast	1866		
Front Dnieper-Lyman Lighthouse		Dnieper-Bug Estuary	Kozachyi Island, Mykolaiv Oblast	1884		
Rear Dnieper-Lyman Lighthouse		Dnieper-Bug Estuary	Kozachyi Island, Mykolaiv Oblast	1884		
Front Katalyne Lighthouse		Dnieper-Bug Estuary	Katalyne, Mykolaiv Oblast			
Rear Katalyne Lighthouse		Dnieper-Bug Estuary	Katalyne, Mykolaiv Oblast	1915		
Adzhyhol Lighthouse		Dnieper-Bug Estuary	Kinburn sandbar, Mykolaiv Oblast	1866	UKR-102	
Front Stanislaus-Adzhyhol		Dnieper-Bug Estuary	on water Kherson Oblast	1915	UKR-052	
Rear Stanislaus-Adzhyhol		Dnieper-Bug Estuary	on water Kherson Oblast	1915		
Front Viktoriv Lighthouse		Dnieper-Bug Estuary	Kinburn sandbar, Mykolaiv Oblast	1856		
Rear Viktoriv Lighthouse		Dnieper-Bug Estuary	Kinburn sandbar, Mykolaiv Oblast	1856		
Front Lupareve Lighthouse		Dnieper-Bug Estuary	Lupareve, Mykolaiv Oblast	1862		
Rear Kysliakivka Lighthouse		Dnieper-Bug Estuary	Lupareve, Mykolaiv Oblast	1862		
Front Khabliv Lighthouse		Dnieper-Bug Estuary	Ochakiv sandbar, Mykolaiv Oblast	1902		
Rear Khabliv Lighthouse		Dnieper-Bug Estuary	Ochakiv sandbar, Mykolaiv Oblast	1902		
Rear Ruska Lighthouse		Dnieper-Bug Estuary	Ruska sandbar, Mykolaiv Oblast	1862		
Tendra Lighthouse		Black Sea	Tendra Spit, Kherson Oblast	1827		
Front Ochakiv Lighthouse		Dnieper-Bug Estuary	Ochakiv, Mykolaiv Oblast	1826		
Rear Ochakiv Lighthouse		Dnieper-Bug Estuary	Ochakiv, Mykolaiv Oblast	1826		

=== Sevastopol region ===
Name	Image	Water body	Location	Year	ARLHS code	Notes
Tarkhankut Lighthouse		Black Sea		1817		
Yevpatoriya Lighthouse		Black Sea	Yevpatoriya, Autonomous Republic of Crimea	1861		
Solodunov Lighthouse		Black Sea	Yevpatoriya, Autonomous Republic of Crimea	1986		
Karantynnyi Lighthouse		Black Sea	Yevpatoriya, Autonomous Republic of Crimea	1897		
Front Kostiantynivskyi Exiting Lighthouse		Black Sea	Sevastopol	1987		
Front Inkerman Lighthouse		Black Sea	Inkerman, Sevastopol	1821		
Rear Inkerman Lighthouse		Black Sea	Inkerman, Sevastopol	1821		
Artek Lighthouse		Black Sea	Alushta, Autonomous Republic of Crimea	1977		
Ay-Todorskyi Lighthouse		Black Sea	Yalta, Autonomous Republic of Crimea	1835		
Sarych Lighthouse		Black Sea	Sarych, Autonomous Republic of Crimea	1898		
Chersonese Lighthouse		Black Sea	Sevastopol	1816, rebuilt 1950-1951		Entrance to Sevastopol bay
Yalta Lighthouse		Black Sea	Yalta, Autonomous Republic of Crimea	1908		

=== Kerch region ===
Name	Image	Water body	Location	Year	ARLHS code	Notes
Front Burun Lighthouse		Kerch Strait	Kerch, Autonomous Republic of Crimea	1906		
Rear Burun Lighthouse		Kerch Strait	Kerch, Autonomous Republic of Crimea	1906		
Front Komysh-Burun Lighthouse		Kerch Strait	Kerch, Autonomous Republic of Crimea	1866		
Rear Churubash Lighthouse		Kerch Strait	Kerch, Autonomous Republic of Crimea	1872		
Kyz-Aul Lighthouse		Kerch Strait	Kerch, Autonomous Republic of Crimea	1875		
Chauda Lighthouse		Kerch Strait	Kerch, Autonomous Republic of Crimea	1886		
Illinskyi [St Elijah] Lighthouse		Black Sea	Feodosiya, Autonomous Republic of Crimea	1899		
Meganom Lighthouse				1895		
Rybachyi [Fishing] Lighthouse		Black Sea		1968		
Front Pavlovskyi Lighthouse		Kerch Strait	Kerch, Autonomous Republic of Crimea	1863		
Rear Pavlovskyi Lighthouse		Kerch Strait	Kerch, Autonomous Republic of Crimea	1907		
Biryuchy Lighthouse		Sea of Azov	Henichesk, Kherson Oblast	1882		
Henichesk Lighthouse		Sea of Azov	Henichesk, Kherson Oblast	1883		
Upper Berdyansk Lighthouse		Sea of Azov	Berdyansk, Zaporizhia Oblast	1878		
Lower Berdyansk Lighthouse		Sea of Azov	Berdyansk, Zaporizhia Oblast	1838		
Bilosarayska Lighthouse		Sea of Azov	Mariupol, Donetsk Oblast	1836		

=== Other lighthouses ===
Name	Image	Water body	Location	Year	ARLHS code	Notes
Yeni Kale Lighthouse						
Old Dzharylhach Lighthouse		Black Sea	Dzharylhach			
Dzharylhach Lighthouse		Black Sea	Dzharylhach			

== Ukrainian Philately ==
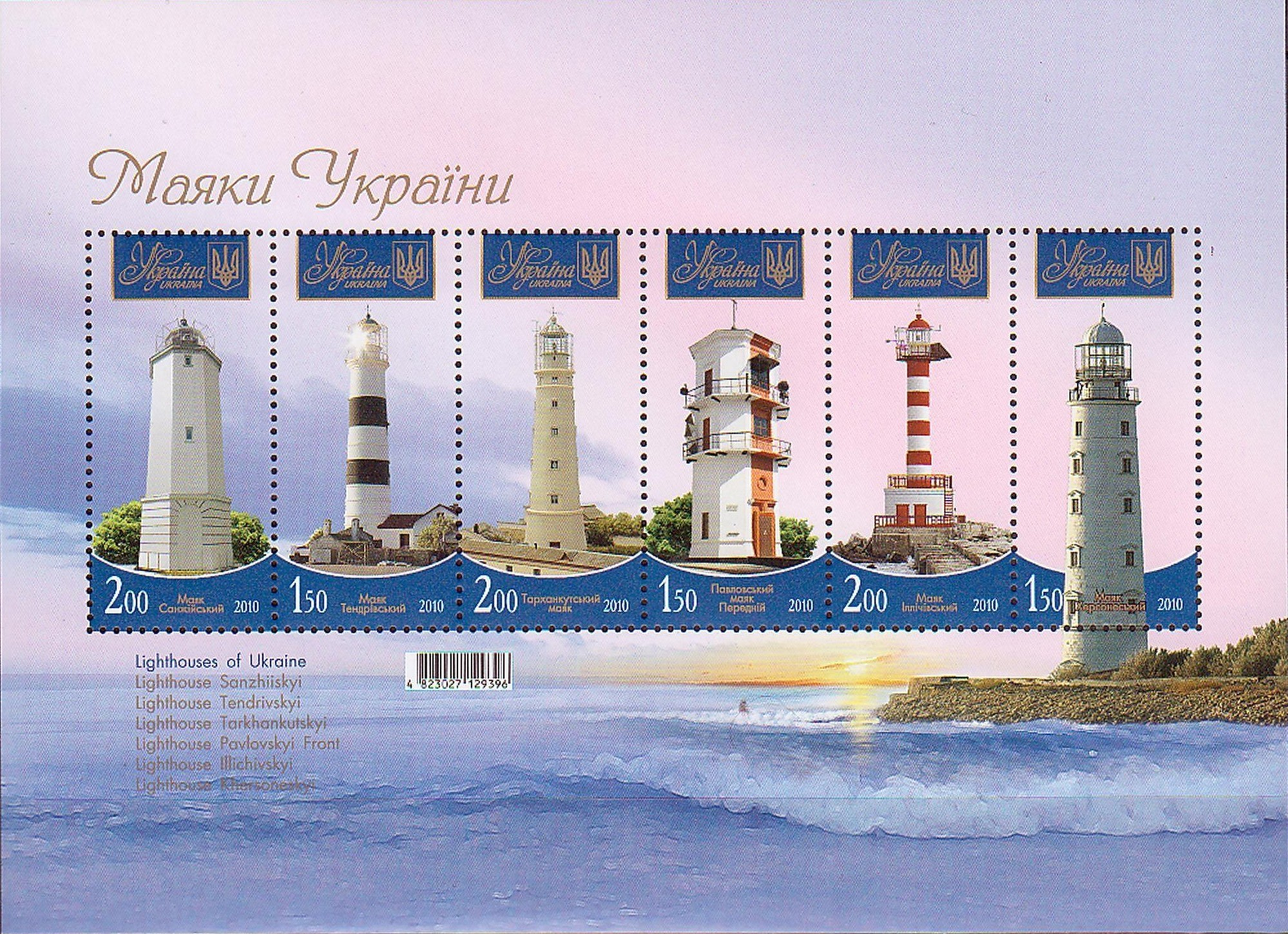
2010 Ukrainian post stamp "Lighthouses of Ukraine" (left to right): Sanzhyika, Tendra, Tarkhankut, Front Lighthouse of Pavlov, Illichivsk, and Chersonesos

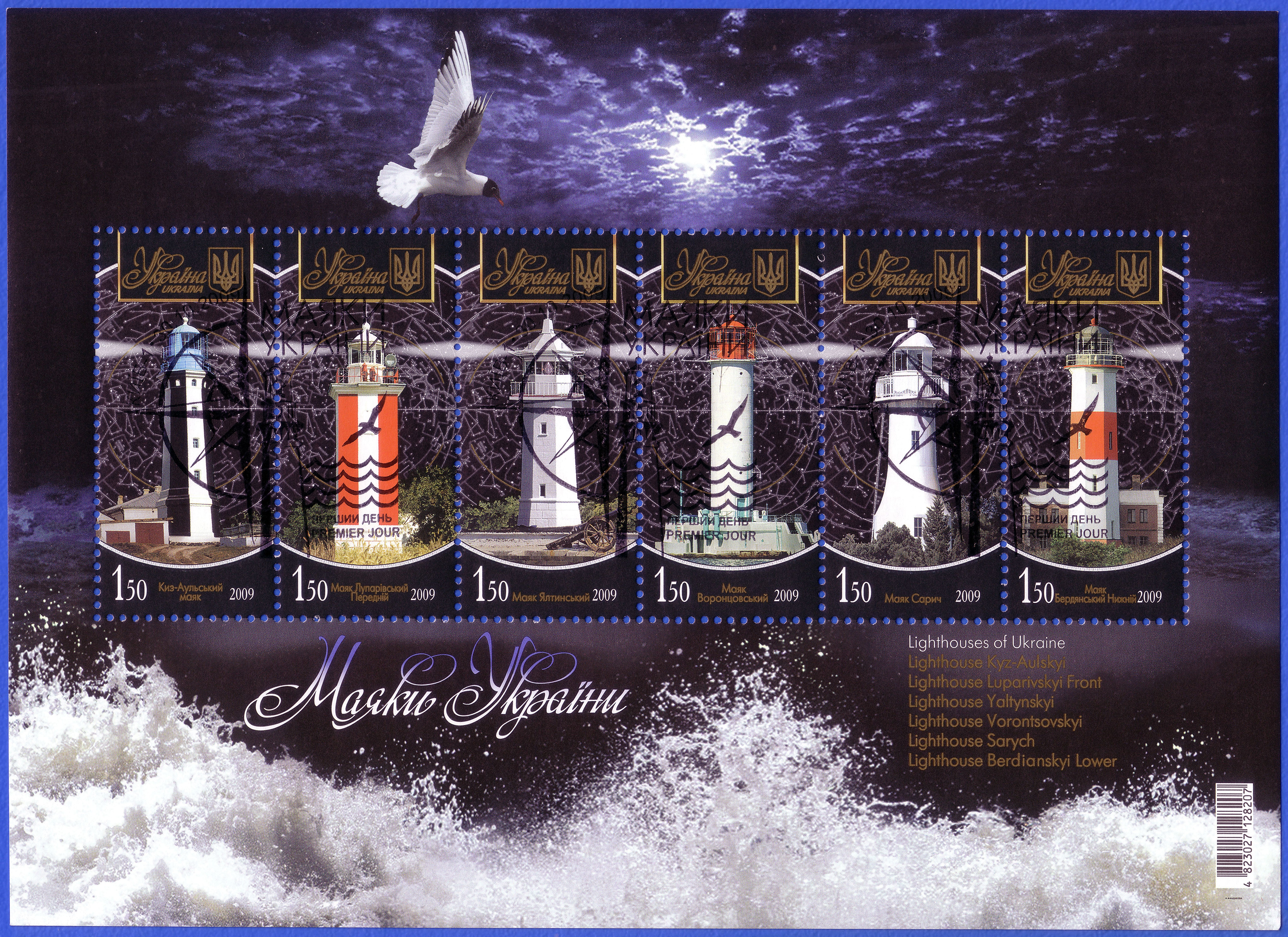
2009 Ukrainian post stamp "Lighthouses of Ukraine"

== See also ==
- Lists of lighthouses and lightvessels
