= Yeni Kale Lighthouse =

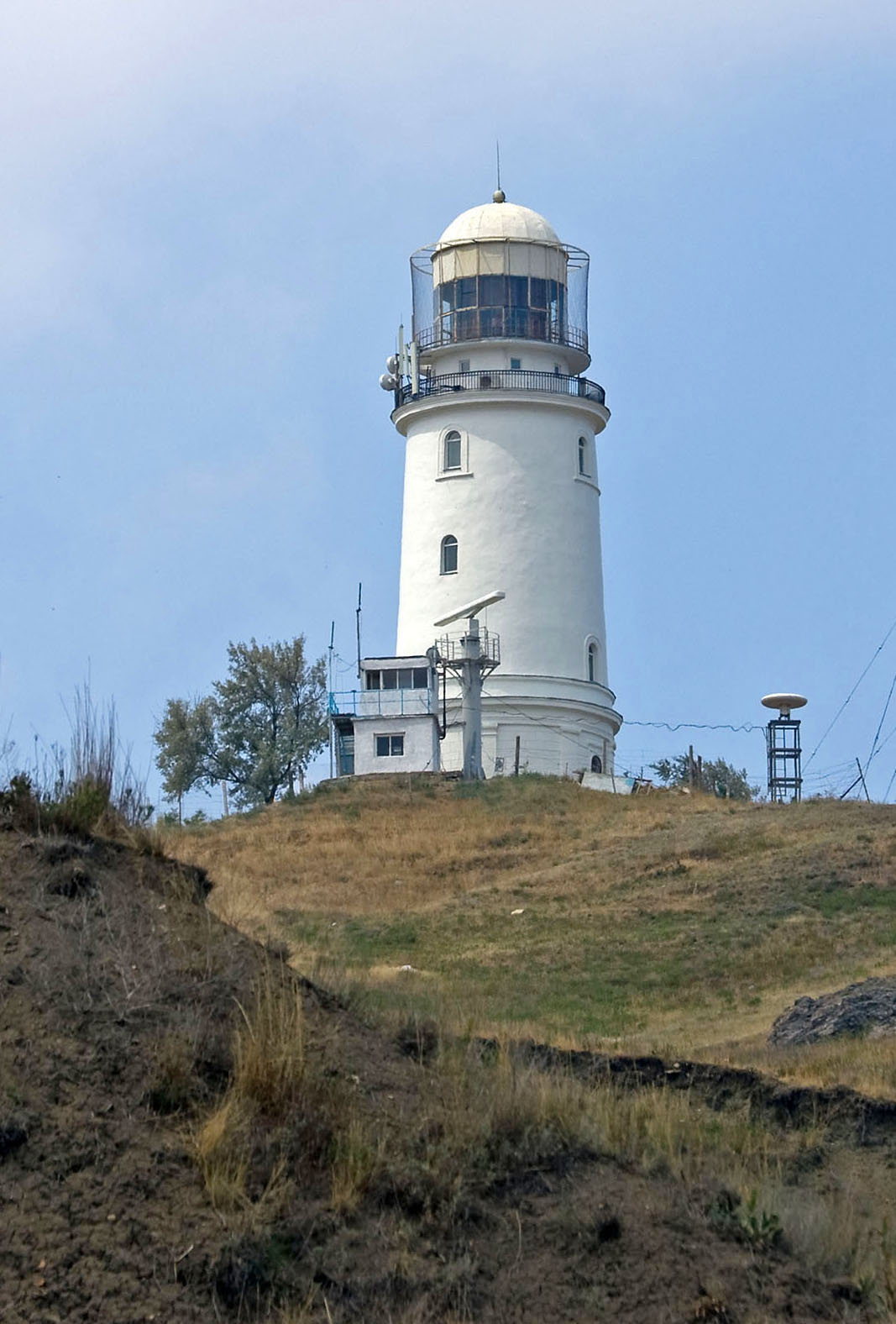
- Yeni Kale Lighthouse
- Location: Kerch; Crimea
- Coordinates: 45°23′08″N 36°38′20″E

Tower
- Constructed: 1820 (first); 1861 (second)
- Construction: stone tower
- Height: 27 metres (89 ft)
- Shape: cylindrical tower with balcony and lantern
- Markings: white tower and lantern
- Operator: Gosgidrografiya

Light
- First lit: 1953 (current)
- Focal height: 123 metres (404 ft)
- Characteristic: Fl WR 12s.

The Yeni Kale Lighthouse (Ukrainian: Єнікальський маяк, Enikal'skyy mayak, Russian: Еникальский маяк, Yenikal'sky mayak) is an active lighthouse on Cape Fonar near Yeni-Kale fortress in eastern Crimea on the shore of Kerch Strait. Navigation cressets on this coast were first mentioned in the Periplus of Scylax, dated 350 BC.

== History ==
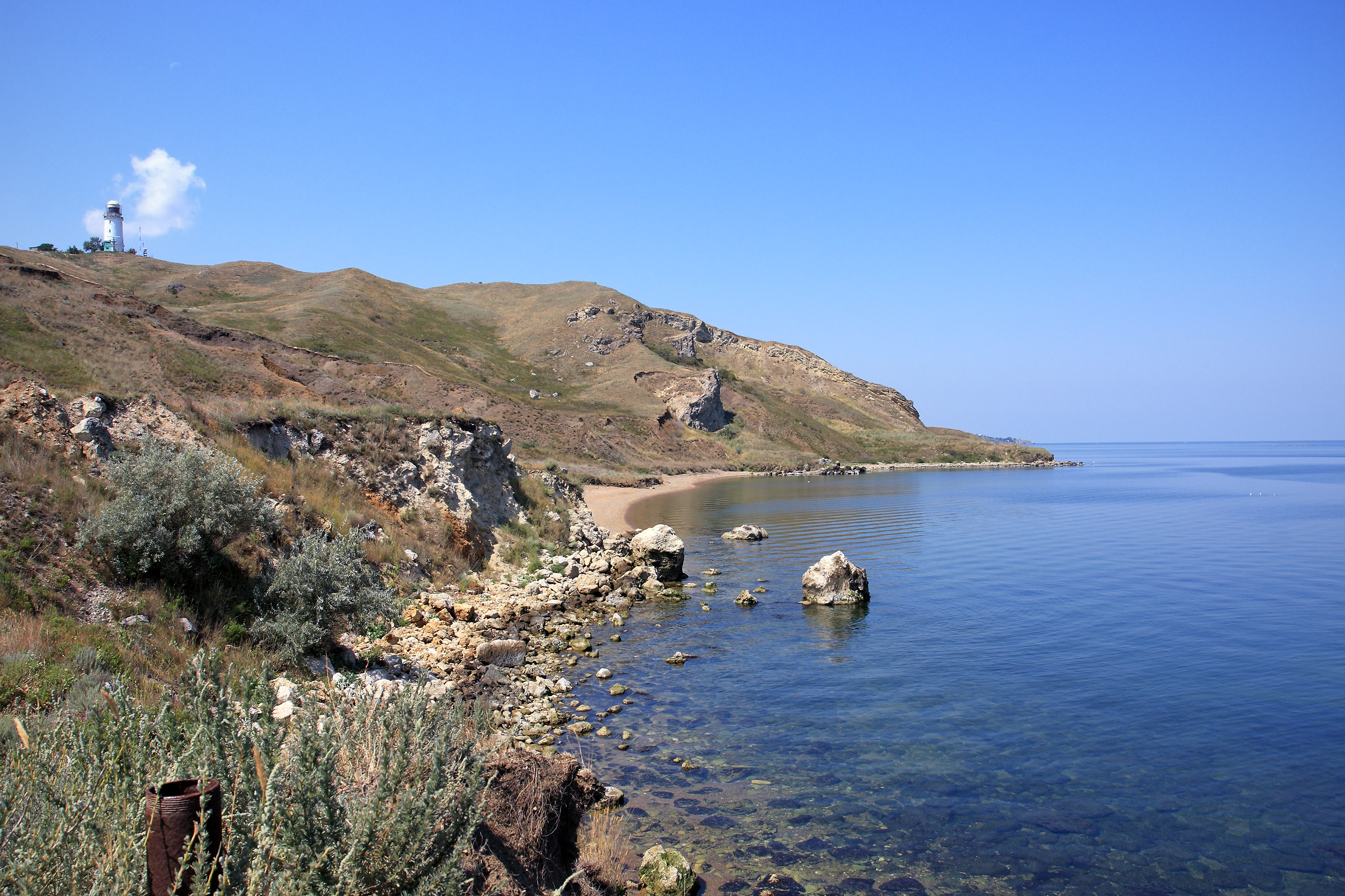
Cape Fonar

In 1820 a lighthouse tower was built on the top of Cape Fonar to guide ships navigating from the Sea of Azov to Kerch Strait. Oil lamps were used as a light source. In 1861 Fresnel lens with kerosene lamps were installed.

Until the Second World War the Yeni Kale Lighthouse was considered as the oldest lighthouse in Crimea. In 1941, during World War II, the lighthouse equipment was evacuated to Taman coast by light-house keeper Mikhail Egorov. In May 1942 a battle between retreating Red Army and Nazi Germany took place in Cape Fonar area. Alexander Filimonov, a Soviet mariner, aimed the fire of Soviet batteries. When German tanks appeared near the lighthouse, a flag was risen on the tower targeting the Soviet fire from the Chushka Spit. The tower got destroyed in this battle and hydrographers besieged in the lighthouse died. In 1943 a temporary light was installed on lighthouse ruins. When Kerch was liberated from German troops in April 1944, the lighthouse equipment was returned.

After the war a provisional wooden tower was constructed in 1946. It was replaced with an electric-powered lighthouse with a modern stone tower in 1953. The EMV-3 optical system was installed on the Yenikalsky Lighthouse in 1957. The lighthouse was equipped with a modern GLONASS-GPS system in 2002.

== Gallery ==
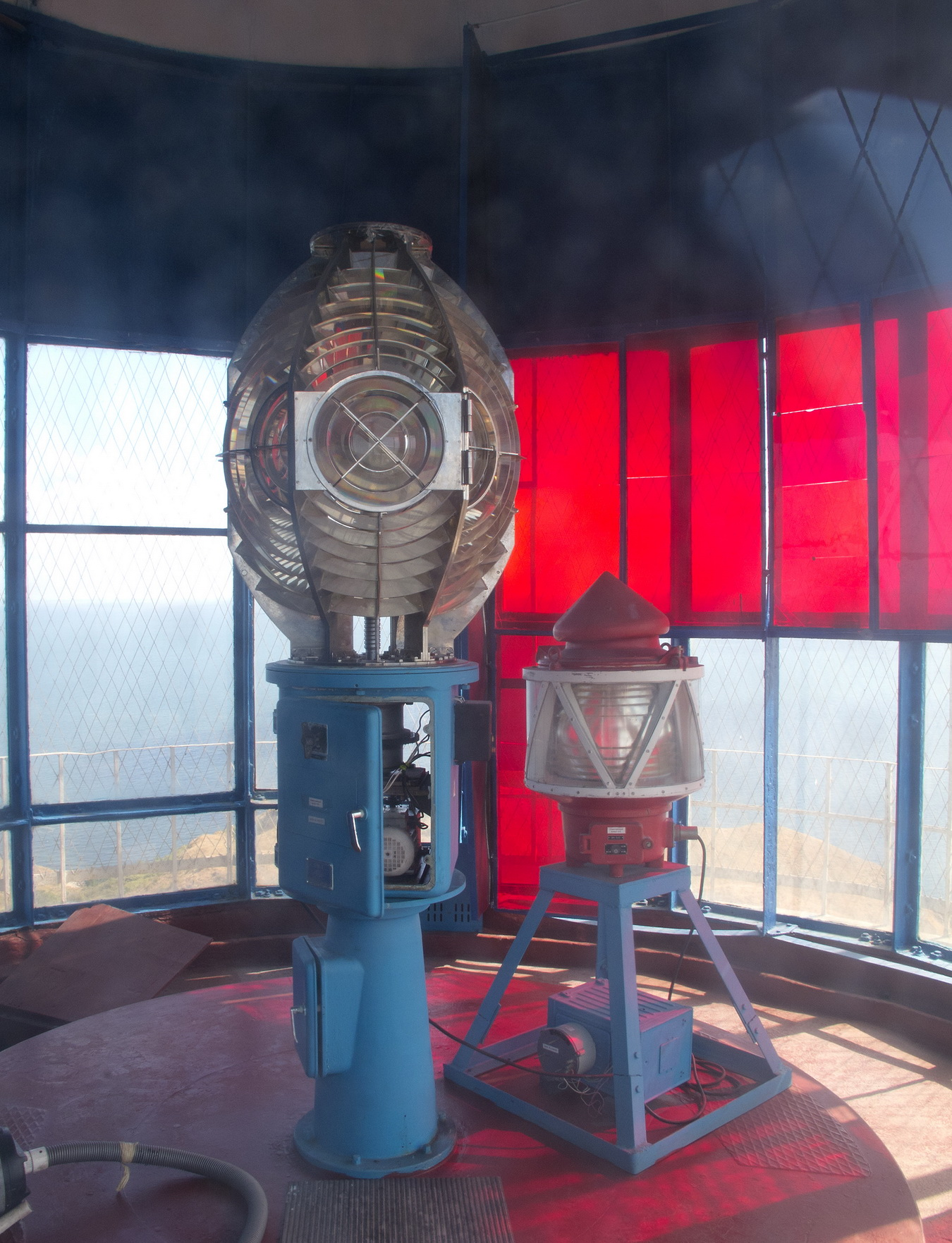
Lamp and optics of Yeni Kale Lighthouse

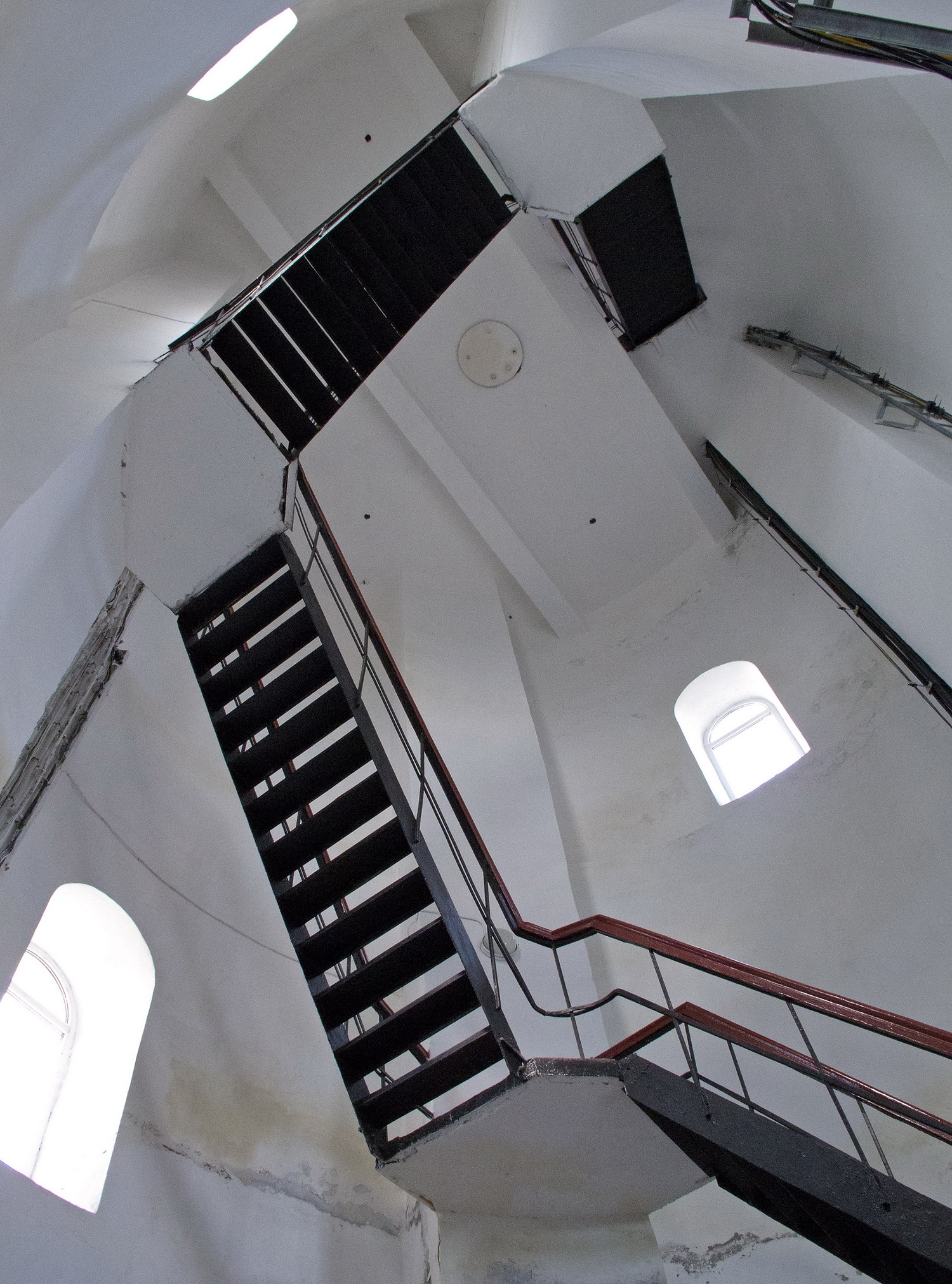
Inside the tower of Yeni Kale Lighthouse

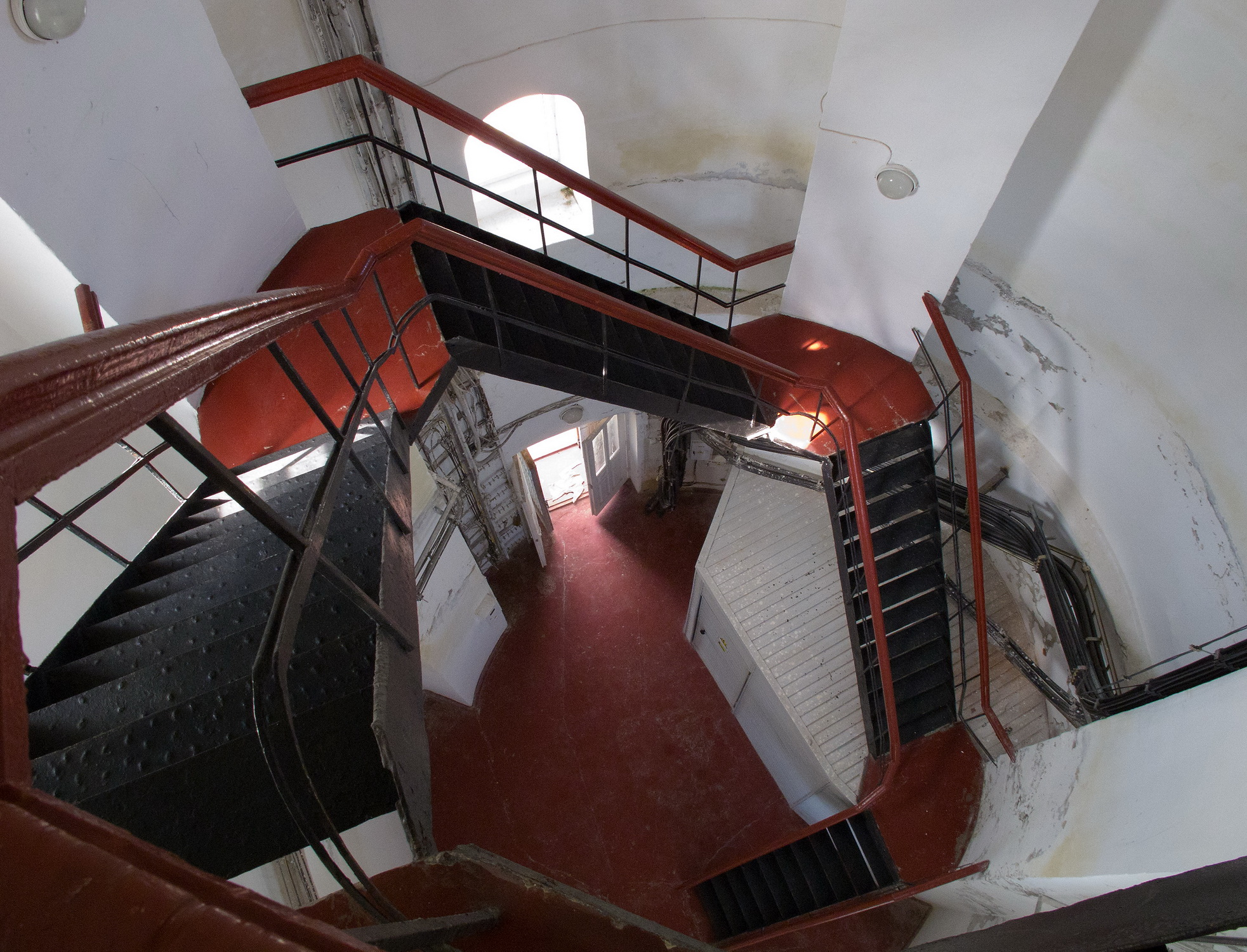
Interior of Yeni Kale Lighthouse's tower

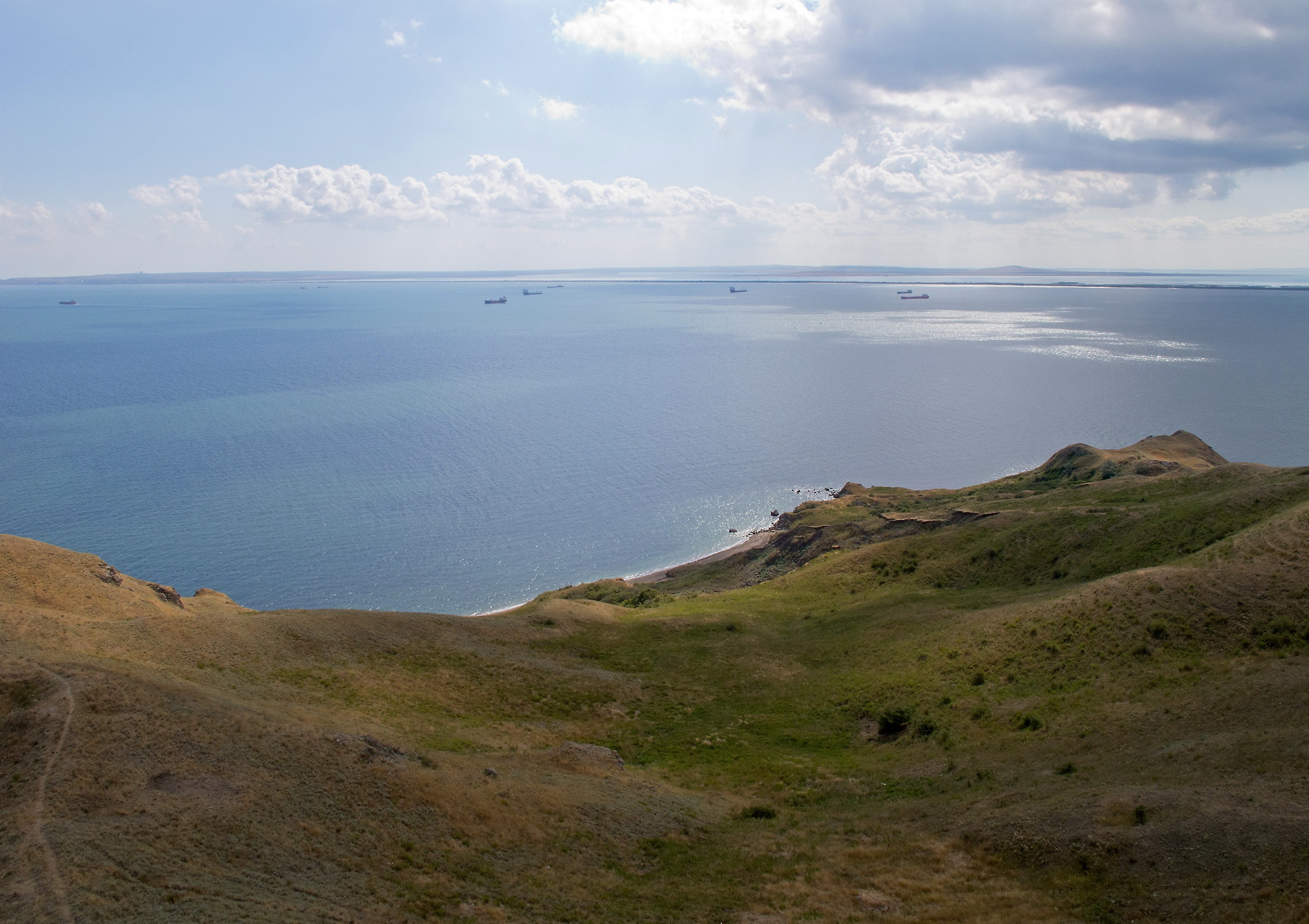
View on Kerch Strait from the tower of Yeni Kale Lighthouse

== See also ==
- List of lighthouses in Ukraine
