= Cape Fonar =

Easternmost point of the Crimean peninsula

Coordinates: 45°22′58″N 36°38′43″E

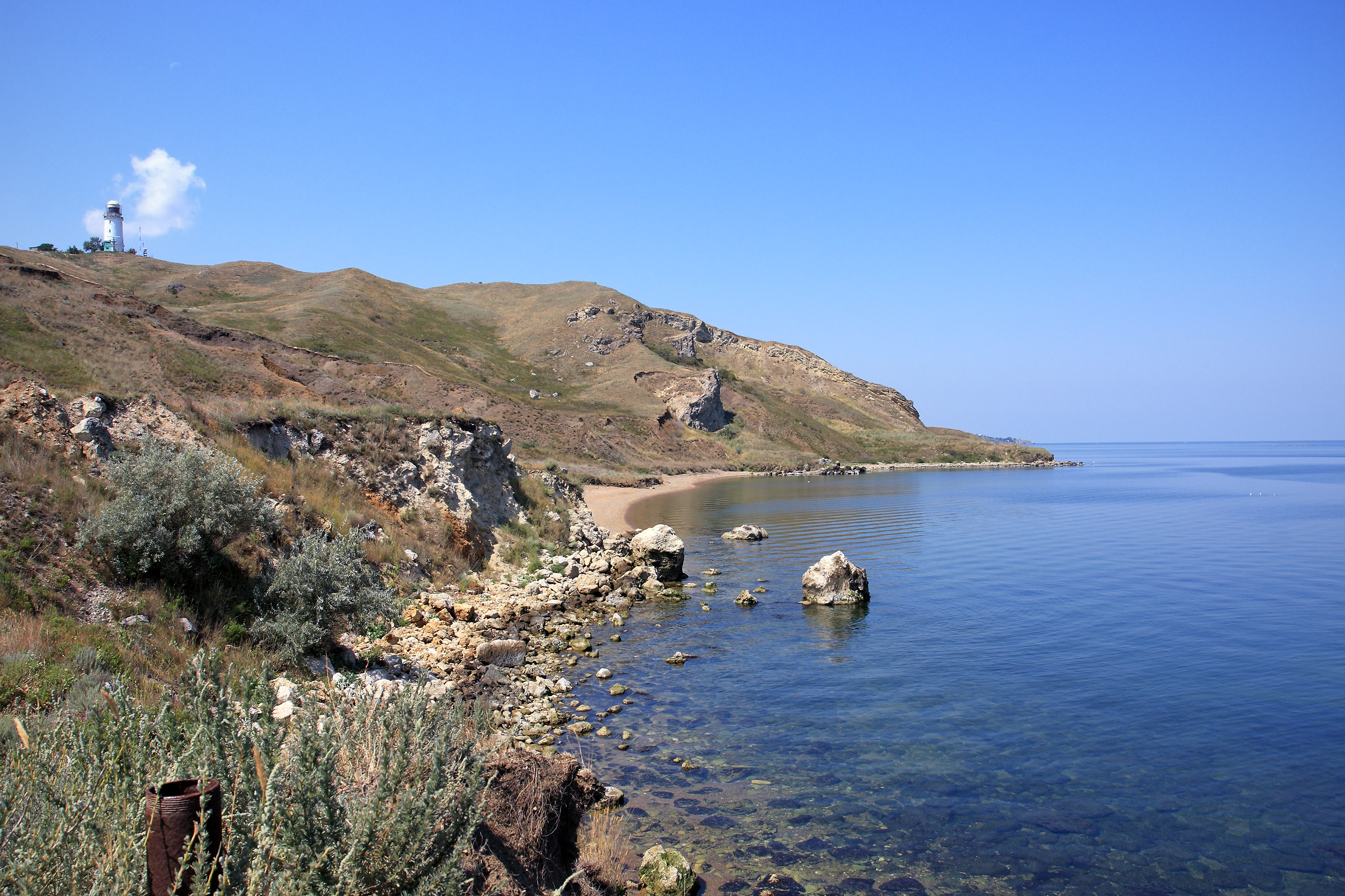
Cape Fonar

Cape Fonar, location on the map of Crimea

Cape Fonar (Russian: Мыс Фонарь; Ukrainian: Мис Фонар; Crimean Tatar: Fener, Фенер; Greek: Παρθένιον) is the easternmost point of the Crimean peninsula. The cape is located on the western shore of Kerch Strait near the exit to Azov Sea.

The cape was named Fonar (Russian: фонарь) that means lamp or light since it was often used as a base for navigation cressets. Nowadays the Yenikalsky Lighthouse is located on top of Cape Fonar.

Unpopulated rocky coast of Cape Fonar attracts large amounts of seabirds, also dice snakes are common there. The cape is occasionally visited by tourists and local fishermen.

== History ==
According to archaeologists Cape Fonar area was populated since the Bronze Age. Sites of ancient settlements of that period have been discovered near the cape.

During the Bosporan Kingdom period a town named Parthenion (Παρθένιον) was located at the cape. It was mentioned in the Periplus of Scylax, dated 350 BC.

In 1820, the Yenikalsky Lighthouse was constructed.

During World War II, several battles between the Red Army and Nazi Germany took place in Cape Fonar area. In 1943, this area was used by the Soviets as a starting point of the Kerch–Eltigen Operation.

New buildings of the Yenikalsky Lighthouse were built in 1953 as a replacement of the original tower destroyed in World War II.

On 23 July 1995, a bulker Doja belonged to a Syrian ship owner sank near Cape Fonar. The ship capsized in stormy sea due to a cargo shift. According to the locals all crew members rescued using onboard life saving equipment. The ship was built in 1962 by Burntisland Shipbuilding Company (Great Britain), she was delivered to James Fisher & Sons as Leven Fisher, latter names: Haj Jassan (1982—1989), Allah Kareem (1989—1994), Doja (since 1994).

In 2011, Cape Fonar was considered as a prospective area for the Crimean Bridge construction project, but after the 2014 annexation of Crimea Russia opted for different route.
