= Stanislav Range Front Light =

Lighthouse in Ukraine

Stanislav Range Front
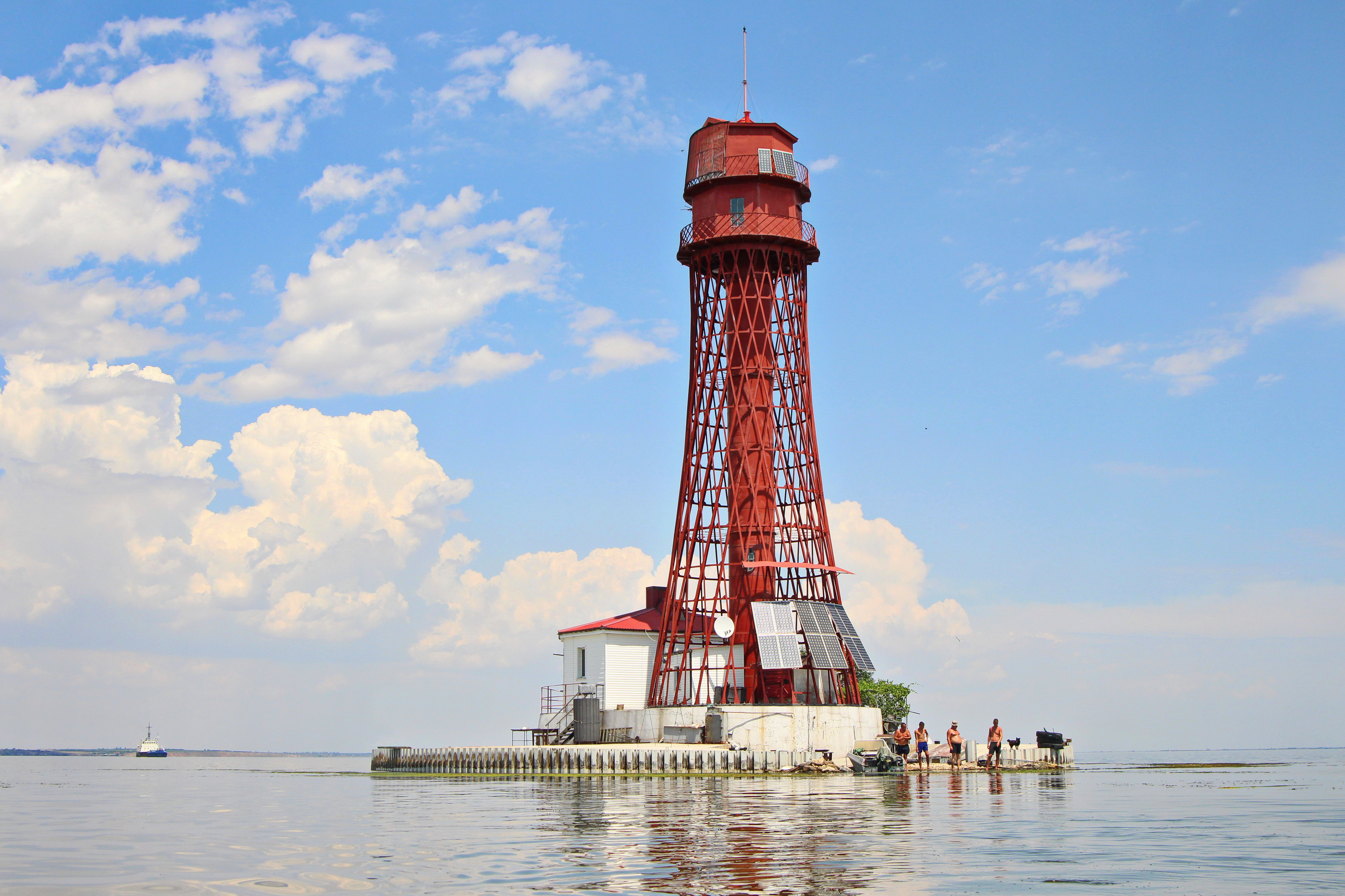
- Stanislav Range Front Light, 2019
- Location: Kherson Oblast, Ukraine
- Coordinates: 46°30′43″N 32°09′04″E

Tower
- Constructed: 1911
- Construction: steel tower
- Height: 85 feet (26 m)
- Shape: circular hyperboloid tower with central cylinder, double balcony, observation room and lantern
- Markings: red tower
- Operator: Gosgidrografiya
- Heritage: State Register of Immovable Monuments of Ukraine

Light
- Focal height: 79 feet (24 m)
- Range: 16 nautical miles (30 km; 18 mi)
- Characteristic: F R on request, visible only on range line
- Ukraine no.: UA-1000

Stanislav Range Front Light or Small Adzhyhol Lighthouse is an active lighthouse and range light, located on a concrete pier on a tiny islet about 7 kilometres (4.3 mi) west northwest of Rybalche, about 35 kilometres (22 mi) from Kherson, Ukraine. Together with Adziogol lighthouse, located 6.49 kilometres (4.03 mi) 109° from it, it serves guiding ships entering the Dnieper River.

The lighthouse is a vertical lattice hyperboloid structure of steel bars, designed in 1910 by Vladimir Shukhov. A watch room is enclosed by the structure, and a one-storey lighthouse keeper's house adjoins the lighthouse.

The site of the tower is accessible only by boat. The site is open to the public but the tower is closed.

== See also ==
- List of lighthouses in Ukraine
- Thin-shell structure
- List of hyperboloid structures
- List of thin shell structures
