= Tarkhankut Lighthouse =

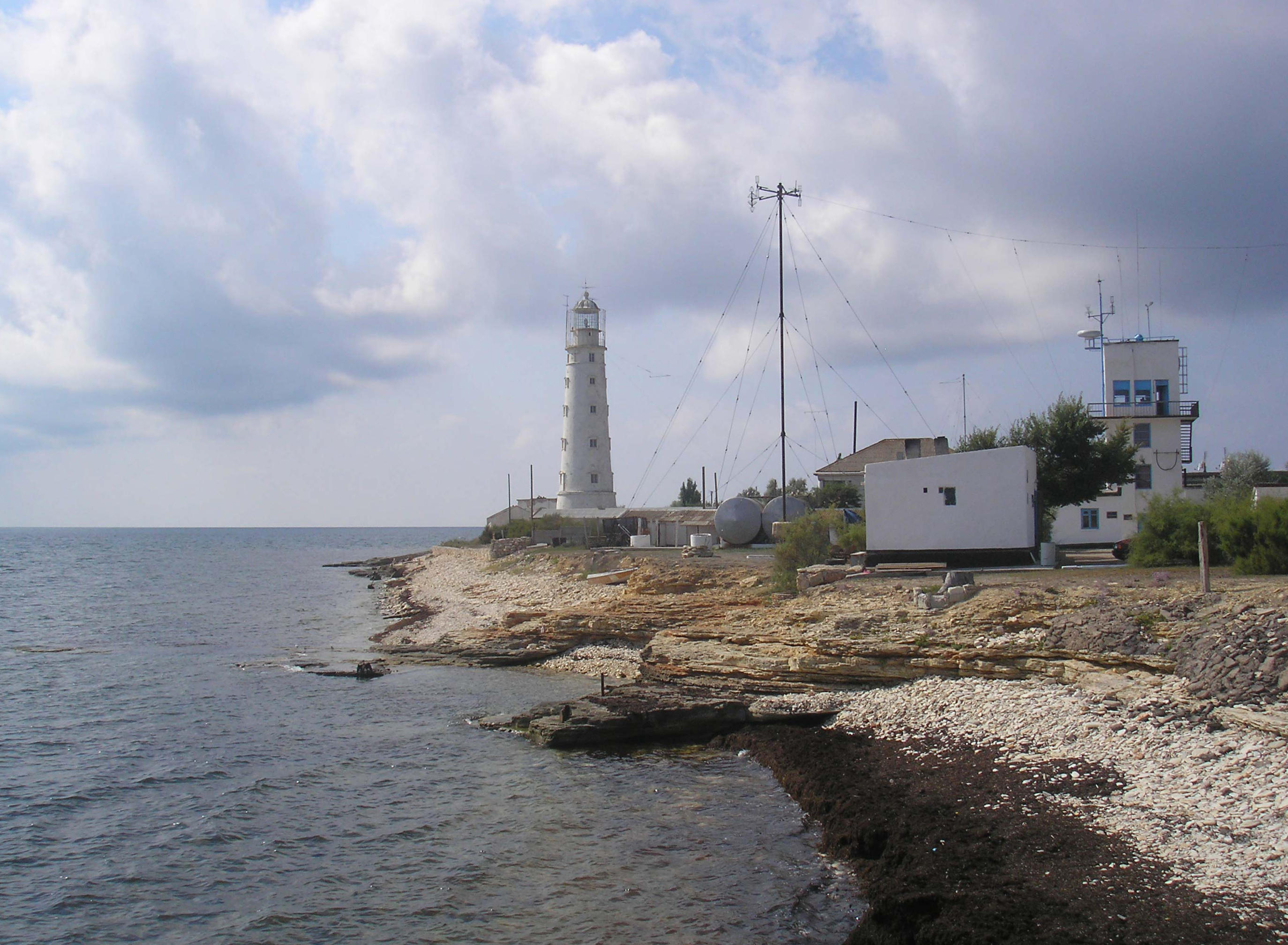
- Location: Cape Tarkhankut; Crimea
- Coordinates: 45°20′49″N 32°29′39″E

Tower
- Constructed: 1817
- Construction: masonry tower
- Height: 33 metres (108 ft)
- Shape: tapered cylindrical tower with balcony and lantern
- Markings: white tower
- Heritage: cultural heritage site in Russia

Light
- Focal height: 36 metres (118 ft)
- Characteristic: LFl (2) W 7.5s.

The Tarkhankut Lighthouse (Ukrainian: Тарханкутський маяк, Tarkhankuts'kyy mayak) is located in Crimea at the Tarkhankut Cape 5 km southwest of the resort village of Olenivka.

== History ==
The construction of the Tarkhankut lighthouse and its twin tower on the Khersones peninsula started in 1816 to ensure safe sailing in the area. The Inkerman stone, of which the building is made, was mined near Sevastopol and transported by barges. No convenient mooring facilities existed at that time, so the barges had to anchor in the harbor and the load was moved to the shore by boats and then transported to the construction site across the steppe.

During the first year of construction, the builders concentrated on the basic structure at the expense of various facilities and decorations. At the end of 1816, the lighthouse looked like a conic 36-metre-high stone tower with a wooden 3.3-metre-high decagonal lantern. The lighthouse became operational in 1817 after its lighting system had been repaired. Three houses were built next to the tower to accommodate the lighthouse personnel and for storage needs. However, cold and humid winters of the Tarkhanut Peninsula, however, made these houses nearly unsuitable for living.

In 1862, the lighting system was upgraded, and the spread of light reached 12.4 miles. In 1873, the construction resumed along with cleaning efforts of the surrounding areas. The building was finished and painted white. In 1876, an additional telegraph spot was built near the tower. On 1 January 1883, a compressed air fog siren was installed, but the process of preparing it for use in fog was usually taking a long time. To address that problem, a bell was set up near the lighthouse in 1899 to be rung while the siren was being prepared.

In 1910, the lighthouse's fuel was changed to kerosene, requiring extra caution and maintenance on the part of the lighthouse keepers. Besides, the installation of the telegraph and meteorological station made it necessary to have communication with by-passing ships.

In 1934, an electric beacon with a 300-kilometer radius of action was added to the lighthouse. In 1959, an electrical power system was installed.

== Current condition ==
Currently the lighthouse is still functioning, despite being in a run-down condition. The area around the building is open for tourists to visit, and tourists are allowed to follow the lighthouse keeper's daily routine. A spiral stairway leads to an observation platform, from which a visitor can see the Black Sea and its steep shores.

== See also ==
- List of lighthouses in Ukraine
- Ichthyander Project
