= Stalinist architecture =

1930s–1950s architectural style of the Soviet Union

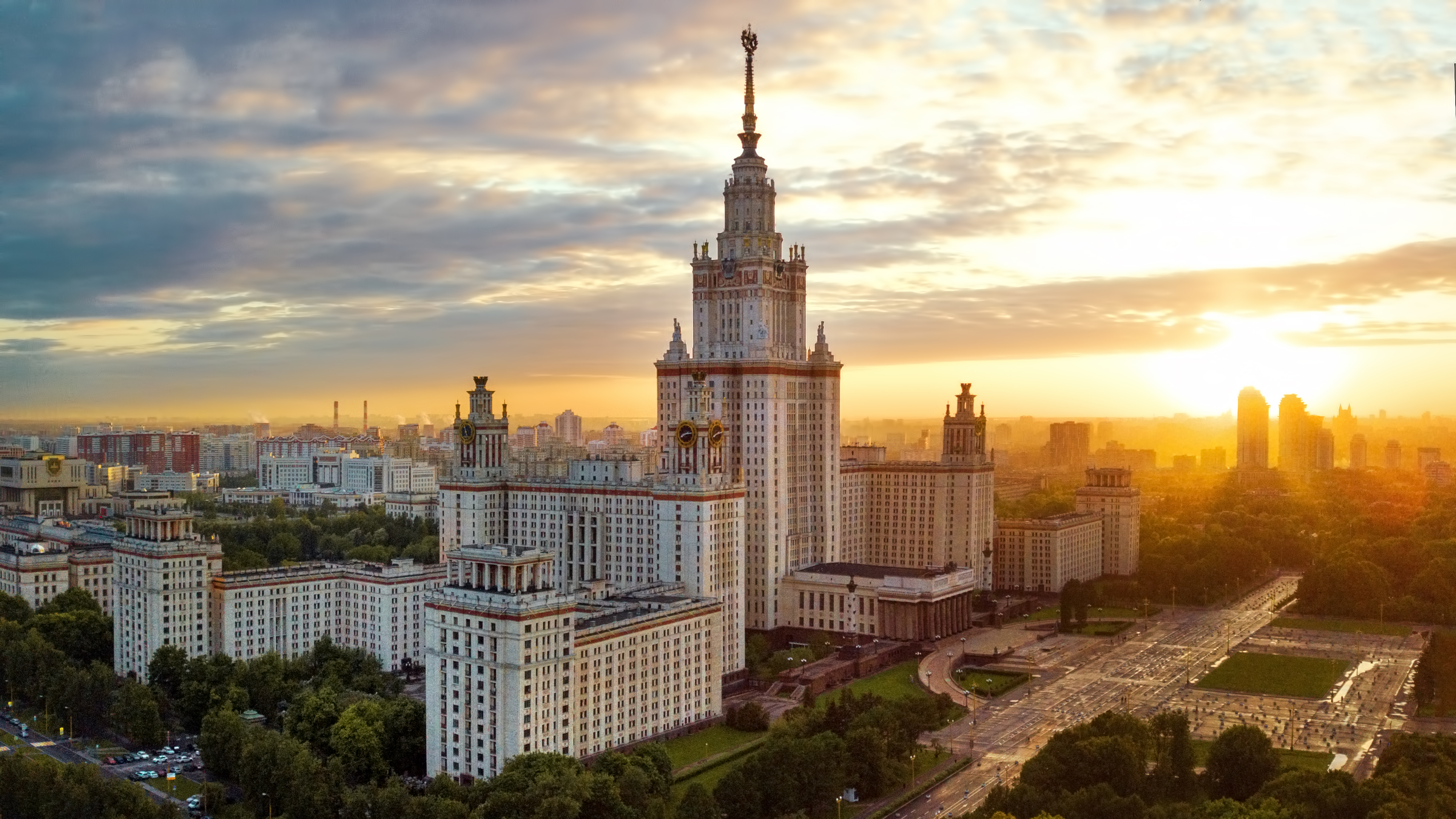
The main building of Moscow State University

Stalinist architecture (Russian: Сталинская архитектура), (Note: Also сталинский ампир, stalinskii ampir ('Stalin's Empire style') or сталинский неоренессанс, stalinskii neorenessans ('Stalin's Neo-renaissance')) mostly known in the former Eastern Bloc as Stalinist style or socialist classicism, is a leading movement in architecture, monumental, and decorative art in the USSR and other countries of the socialist bloc from the mid-1930s to the mid-1950s. The style developed under the conditions of a totalitarian state as a visual embodiment of the triumph of the socialist system, combining elements of classicism, baroque, Napoleonic Empire style, and art deco.

== Features ==
The main features of this style are emphasized monumentality, strict symmetry, the use of a system of orders, and abundant decoration, combining classical forms with Soviet symbols (five-pointed stars, ears of corn, the hammer and sickle, etc.).

The use of expensive natural materials such as marble, granite, and bronze, combined with the palatial splendor of the interiors, served the purpose of creating the image of a triumphant state and a “bright future,” where the aesthetic superiority of form often dominated the functional rationality of space.

Particular attention was paid to the development of the "façade" appearance of cities: the creation of ultra-wide avenues and ceremonial squares was subordinated to the logic of mass processions and demonstrations, transforming the urban environment into a theatrical space. The style's engineering and technical foundations were based on cutting-edge solutions for its time, including the use of steel frames for high-rise construction and complex hydraulic systems in the subway. However, the outer shell always remained emphatically historical, invoking the legacy of the Roman Empire and the Renaissance.

=== Stalin's high-rises ===
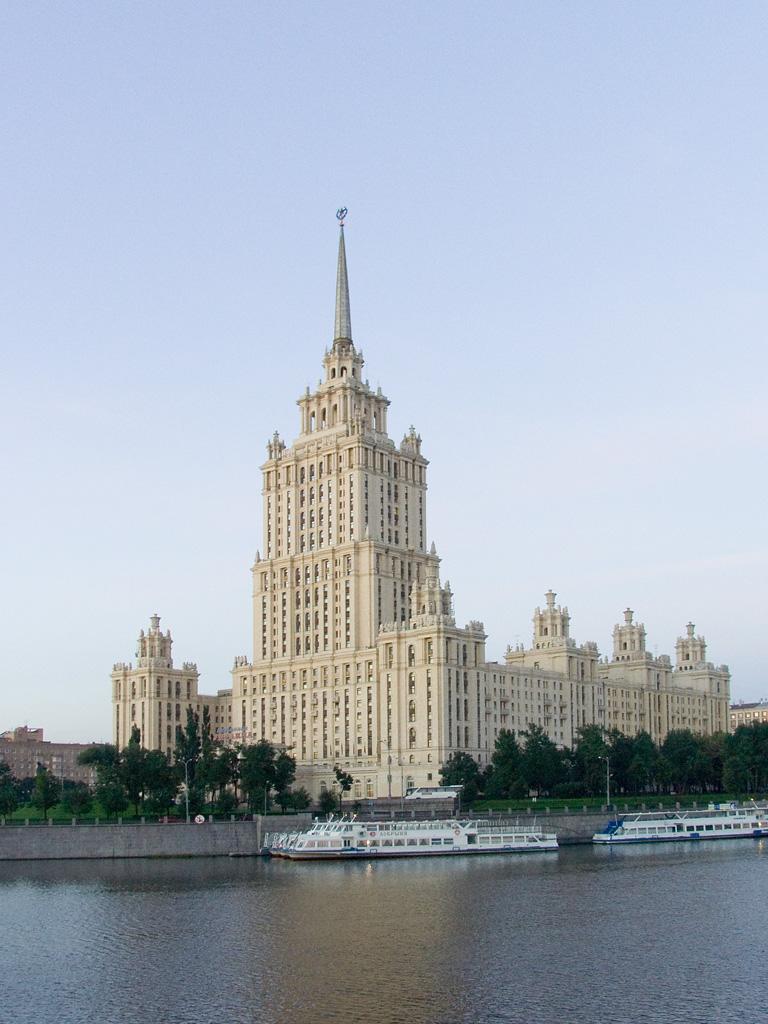
Hotel Ukraina, one of "Stalin's high-rises"

The Stalin's high-rises (Сталинские высотки) are a series of seven high-rise buildings constructed in Moscow between 1947 and 1957, representing the culmination of Stalinist architecture. Designed at the initiative of Joseph Stalin to commemorate Moscow's 800th anniversary, the complex includes the Main Building of Moscow State University, residential buildings on Kotelnicheskaya Embankment and Kudrinskaya Square, the buildings of the Ministry of Foreign Affairs and the Ministry of Transport Construction, as well as the Ukraina and Leningradskaya hotels. The buildings' architectural design draws on a synthesis of neoclassical and American Art Deco, characterized by a stepped silhouette crowned with tall spires bearing Soviet symbols. The project required the implementation of engineering technologies unique to the USSR, including the use of steel frames and artificial ground freezing, which allowed for the creation of a new vertical silhouette for Moscow and the creation of an image of a global "socialist metropolis."

=== Technology ===
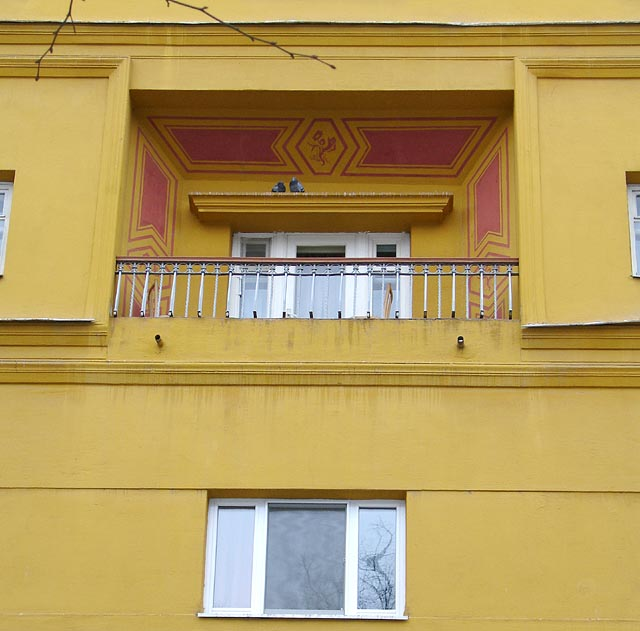
Wet stucco over masonry. Early elite block, Patriarch Ponds, Moscow. Art deco adaptation by Vladimir Vladimirov

In terms of construction methods, most of the structures, underneath the wet stucco walls, are simple brick masonry. Exceptions were Andrei Burov's medium-sized concrete block panel houses (such as the Lace building, 1939–41) and large buildings like the Seven Sisters, which necessitated the use of concrete. The masonry naturally dictated narrow windows, thus leaving a large wall area to be decorated. Fireproof terracotta finishes were introduced during the early 1950s, although this was rarely used outside of Moscow. Most of the roofing was traditional wooden trusses covered with metallic sheets.

About 1948, construction technology improved – at least in Moscow – as faster and cheaper processes became available. Houses also became safer by eliminating wooden ceilings and partitions. The standardized buildings of 1948–1955 had the same housing quality as the Stalinist classics and are classified as such by real estate agents, but are excluded from the scope of Stalinist architecture. Ideologically they belong to mass housing, an intermediate phase before Nikita Khrushchev's standardized buildings known as Khrushchyovka.

=== Scope ===
The Moscow Canal

Although Stalin rejected Constructivism, completion of constructivist buildings extended through the 1930s. Industrial construction, endorsed by Albert Kahn and later supervised by Viktor Vesnin, was influenced by modernist ideas. It was not as important to Stalin's urban plans, so most industrial buildings (excluding megaprojects like the Moscow Canal) are not part of the Stalinist category. Even the first stage of the Moscow Metro, completed during 1935, was not scrutinized by Stalin, and so included substantial constructivist influence.

Thus, the scope of Stalinist architecture is generally limited to urban public and residential buildings of good and middle quality, excluding mass housing, and selected infrastructure projects like the Moscow Canal, the Volga–Don Canal, and the latter stages of the Moscow Metro.

== History ==
=== Background (1900–1931) ===
Before 1917, the Russian architectural scene was divided between Russky Modern (a local interpretation of Art Nouveau, stronger in Moscow), and Neoclassical Revival (stronger in Saint Petersburg). The Neoclassical school produced mature architects like Alexey Shchusev, Ivan Zholtovsky, Ivan Fomin, Vladimir Shchuko and Alexander Tamanian; by the time of the 1917 Revolution they were established professionals, with their own companies, schools and followers. These people would eventually become Stalinism's architectural elders and produce the best examples of the period.

Another school that began after the Revolution is now known as Constructivism. Some of the Constructivists (like the Vesnin brothers) were young professionals who had established themselves before 1917, while others had just completed their professional education (like Konstantin Melnikov) or didn't have any. They associated themselves with groups of modern artists, compensating for lack of experience with public exposure. When the New Economic Policy began, their publicity resulted in architectural commissions. Experience was not gained quickly, and many Constructivist buildings were justly criticized for irrational floor plans, cost overruns and low quality.

For a brief time in the mid-1920s, the architectural profession operated in the old-fashioned manner, with private companies, international contests, competitive bidding and disputes in professional magazines. Foreign architects were welcomed, especially towards the end of this period, when the Great Depression reduced their jobs at home. Among these were Ernst May, Albert Kahn, Le Corbusier, Bruno Taut and Mart Stam. The difference between traditionalists and constructivists was not well defined. Zholtovsky and Shchusev hired modernists as junior partners for their projects, and at the same time incorporated constructivist novelties in their own designs. In 1930 Gosproektstroi was established as part of the Building Commission of Vesenkha with the help of Albert Kahn Inc. It employed 3,000 designers with a budget of 417 million Rbls.

Urban planning developed separately. Housing crises in big cities and the industrialization of remote areas required mass housing construction, development of new territories and reconstruction of old cities. Theorists devised a variety of strategies that created politicized discussions without much practical result; State intervention was imminent.

=== The beginning (1931–1933) ===
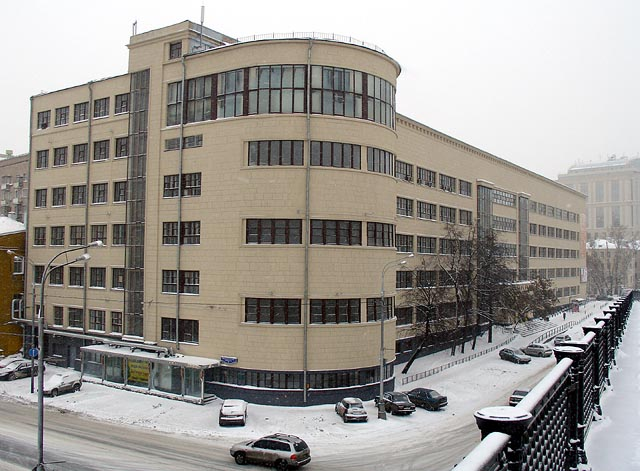
Textile Institute (Moscow), constructivist building completed 1938

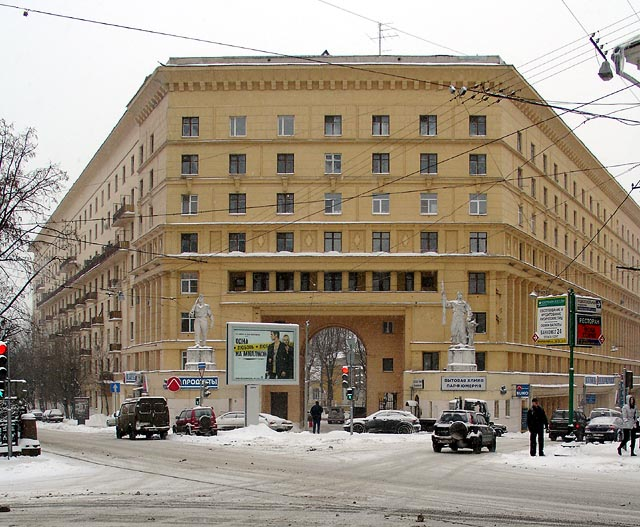
Stalinism by a Constructivist, Ilya Golosov: Moscow, completed 1941

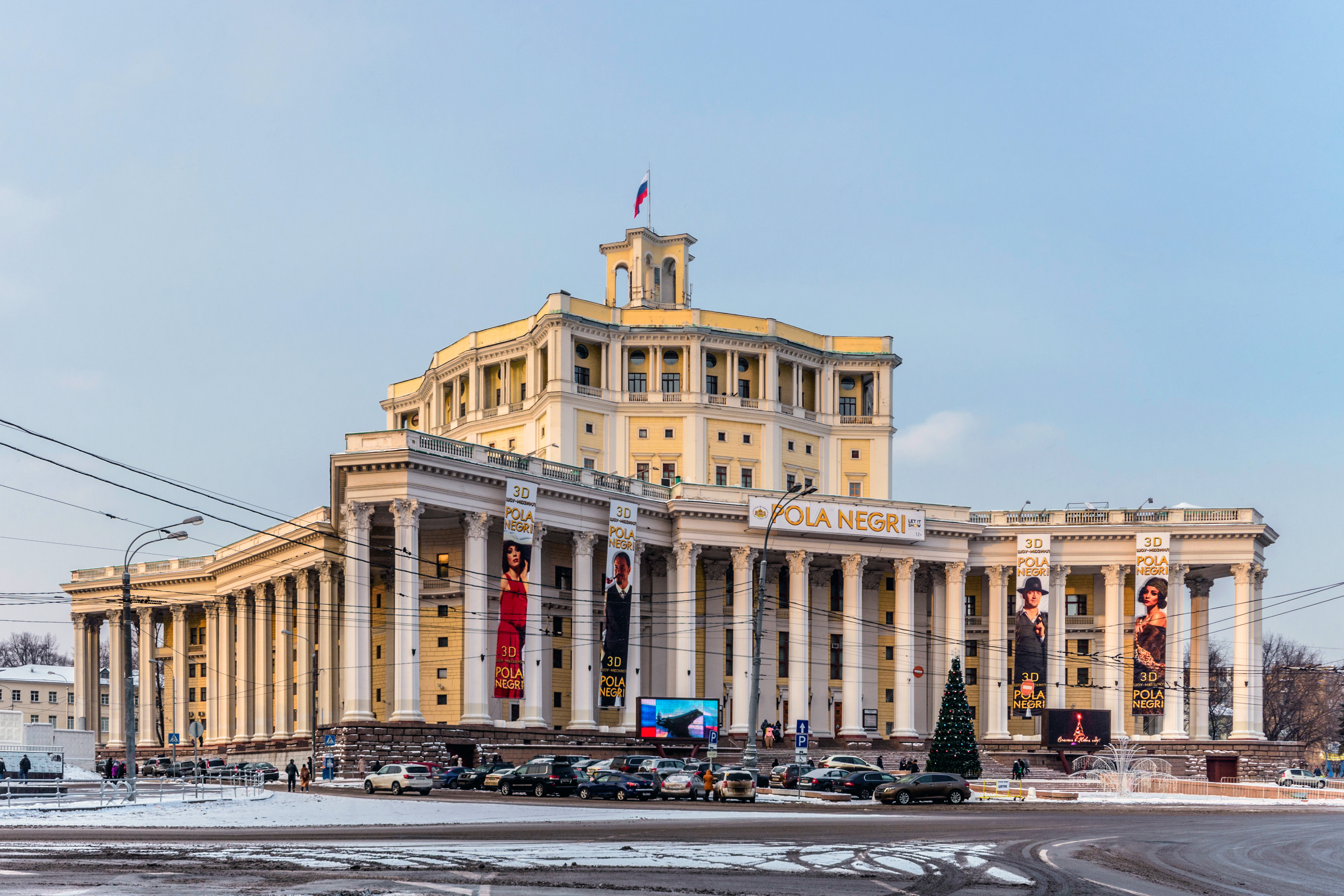
The Red Army Theatre in Moscow, designed in a shape of the Soviet red star

Stalin's personal architectural preferences and the extent of his own influence remains, for the most part, a matter of deduction, conjecture and anecdotal evidence. The facts, or their representation in public Soviet documents, largely concerns the Palace of Soviets contest of 1931–33:

- February 1931 – Major Soviet architects receive invitations to bid for the Palace of Soviets design.
- June 1931 – The Party Plenum authorizes three megaprojects: the reconstruction of Moscow, the Moscow Canal, and the Moscow Metro.
- July 1931 – Architects submit fifteen designs for the first competition, and a second competition is announced, which is to be open to foreign submissions.
- February 1932 – The prize for the second competition is awarded to three drafts (Iofan, Zholtovsky, Hector Hamilton). All modernist designs are rejected.
- March 1932 – 12 architects receive an invitation to a third competition.
- April 1932 – The Party outlaws all independent artistic associations. Viktor Vesnin is assigned to direct the official Union of Soviet Architects.
- July 1932 – five architects receive an invitation to a fourth competition.
- August 1932 – Stalin (then in Sochi) writes a memorandum to Voroshilov, Molotov and Kaganovich. The memorandum explains his opinion of the competition entries, selects Iofan's draft and proposes specific changes to it. This memorandum, first published design 2001, is the basis for most conjectures concerning Stalin's personal influence.
- February 1933 – The fourth competition closes with no winner announced.
- May 1933 – Public approval of Iofan's draft.
- September 1933 – All Moscow architects are assigned to twenty Mossovet workshops, most of them directed by traditionalist architects (Shchusev, Zholtovsky etc.).

The architects invited to direct these workshops included traditionalists Ivan Zholtovsky, Alexey Shchusev, Ivan Fomin, Boris Iofan, Vladimir Schuko as well as practising constructivists: Ilya Golosov, Panteleimon Golosov, Nikolai Kolli, Konstantin Melnikov, Victor Vesnin, Moisei Ginzburg and Nikolai Ladovsky. This began an important trend that lasted until 1955. Stalin chose Iofan for one project, but retained all competing architects in his employ.

=== Pre-war Stalinist architecture (1933–1941) ===
==== Early Stalinism (1933–1935) ====
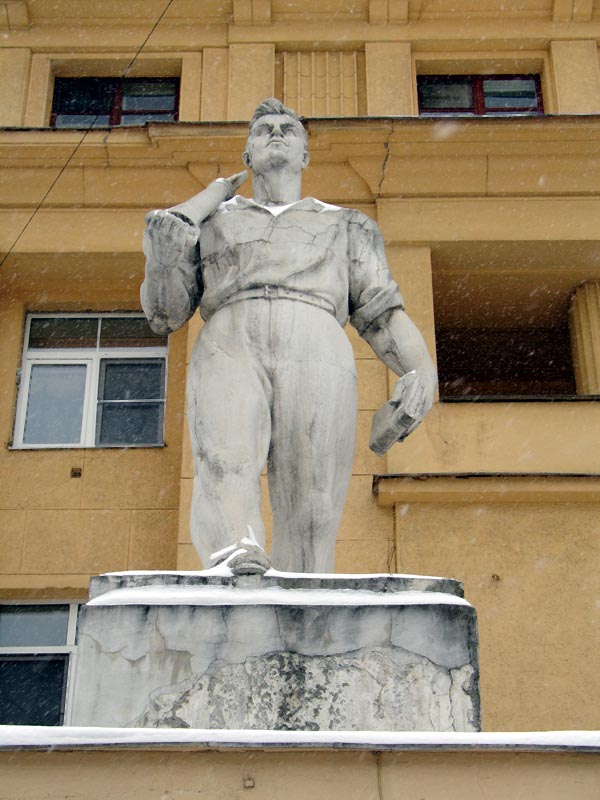
Socialist realism statue in front of Ilya Golosov's building

The first years of Stalinist architecture are characterized by individual buildings, or, at most, single-block development projects. Rebuilding vast spaces of Moscow proved much more difficult than razing historical districts. The three most important Moscow buildings of this time are on the same square, all built between 1931 and 1935, yet each draft evolved independently, with little thought given to overall ensemble (see prewar movie stills 1936 1938 1939). Each set its own vector of development for the next two decades.

- The Mokhovaya Street Building by Zholtovsky, an Italian Renaissance architecture fantasy, is a direct precursor of post-war exterior luxury (Stalin's "Empire" style). However, its size is consistent with nearby 19th-century buildings.
- The Moskva Hotel by Alexey Shchusev. This line of development was uncommon in Moscow (a tower on top of Tchaikovsky Hall was never completed), but similar grand edifices were built in Baku and Kiev. Slim Roman arches of Moskva balconies were common all over the country in the 1930s. After the war they persisted in southern cities but disappeared from Moscow.
- Finally, Arkady Langman's STO Building (later Gosplan, currently State Duma): a modest but not grim structure with strong vertical detailing. This style, a clever adaptation of American Art Deco, required expensive stone and metal finishes, thus it had a limited influence – the House of Soviets in Leningrad, finished in 1941, and Tverskaya Street in Moscow.

А separate type of development, known as "early Stalinism" or Postconstructivism, evolved from 1932 to 1938. It can be traced both to simplified Art Deco (through Schuko and Iofan), and to indigenous Constructivism, being converted slowly to Neoclassicism (Ilya Golosov, Vladimir Vladimirov). These buildings retain the simple rectangular shapes and large glass surfaces of Constructivism, but with ornate balconies, porticos and columns (usually rectangular and very lightweight). By 1938, it became disused.

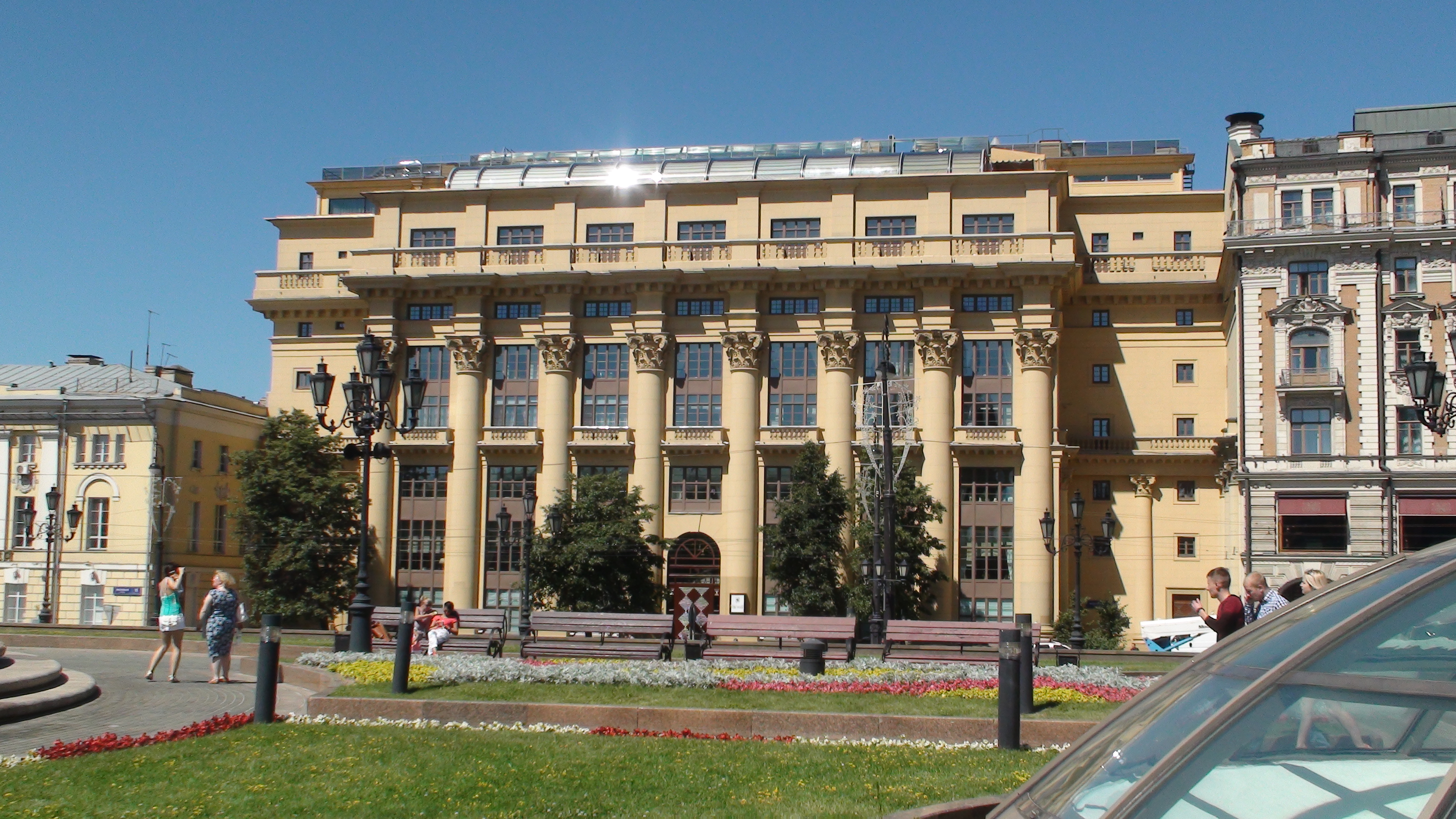
Mokhovaya Street Building by Ivan Zholtovsky, 1931–1934

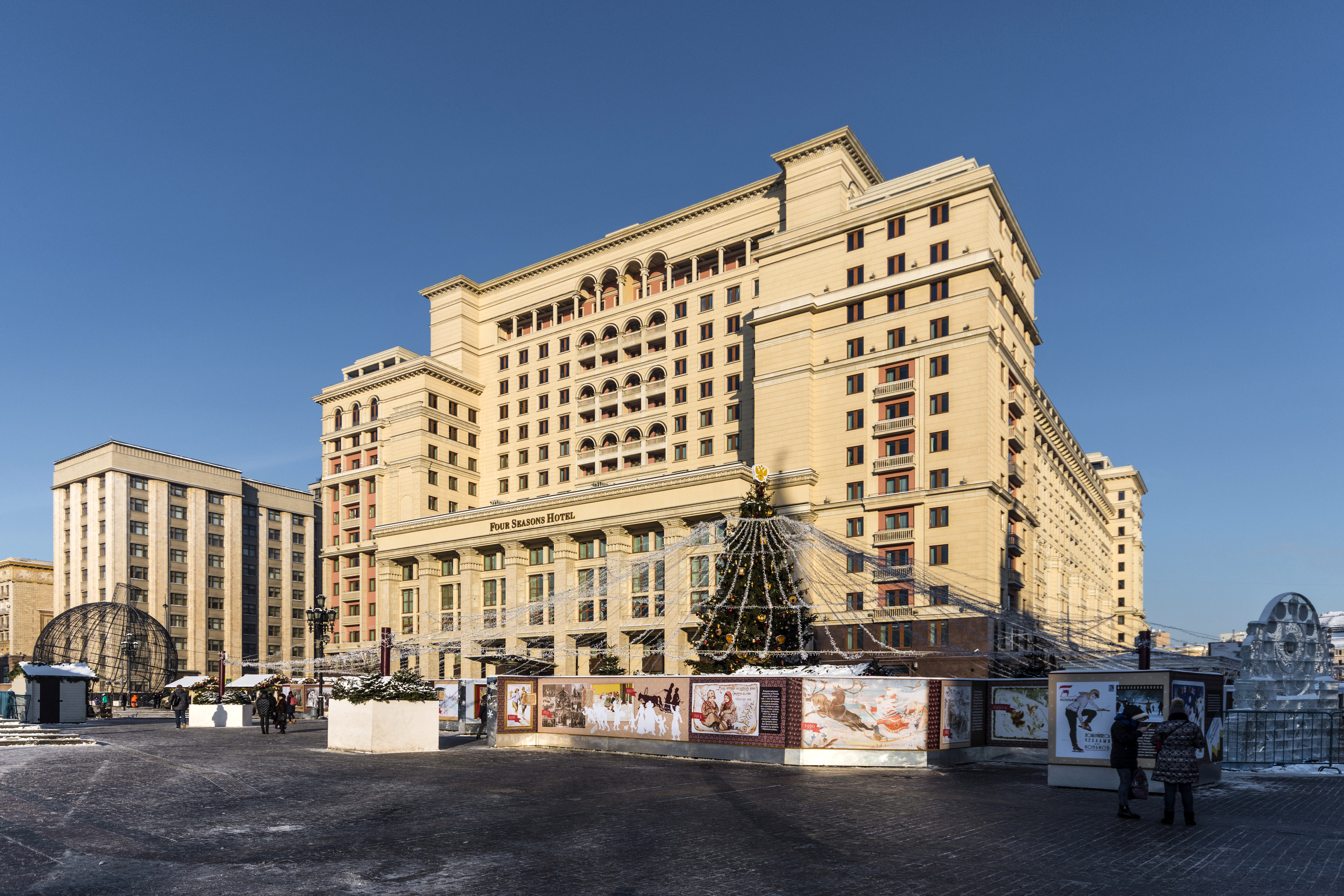
Modern replica of the Moskva Hotel by Alexey Shchusev, 1932–1935

==== Moscow Master Plan (1935) ====
In July 1935 the State evaluated the results and finally issued a decree on the Moscow Master Plan. The Plan, among other things, included Stalin's urban development ideas:

- New development must proceed by whole ensembles, not by individual buildings.
- City block size should increase from the current 1.5–2 ha (4–5 acres) to 9–15 ha (22–37 acres).
- New development must be limited in density to 400 persons per 1 ha (160 per acre).
- Buildings should be at least 6 storeys high; 7-10-14 storey on first-rate streets.
- Embankments are first-rate streets, only zoned for first-rate housing and offices

These rules effectively banned low-cost mass construction in the old city and "first-rate" streets, as well as single-family homebuilding. Low-cost development proceeded in remote areas, but most funds were diverted to new, expensive "ensemble" projects which valued façades and grandeur more than the needs of overcrowded cities.

The Moscow Master Plan also included maintaining old city cores as administrative areas while building industry on city peripheries with green space and residences between the two.

==== Moscow Canal (1932–1938) ====
The canal connects the Moskva River with the main transportation artery of European Russia, the Volga River. It is located in Moscow itself and in the Moscow Oblast. The canal connects to the Moskva River 191 kilometers from its estuary in Tushino (an area in the north-west of Moscow), and to the Volga River in the town of Dubna, just upstream of the dam of the Ivankovo Reservoir. Length of the canal is 128 km.

It was constructed from the year 1932 to the year 1937 by gulag prisoners during the early-to-mid Stalin era.

==== Moscow Avenues (1938–1941) ====
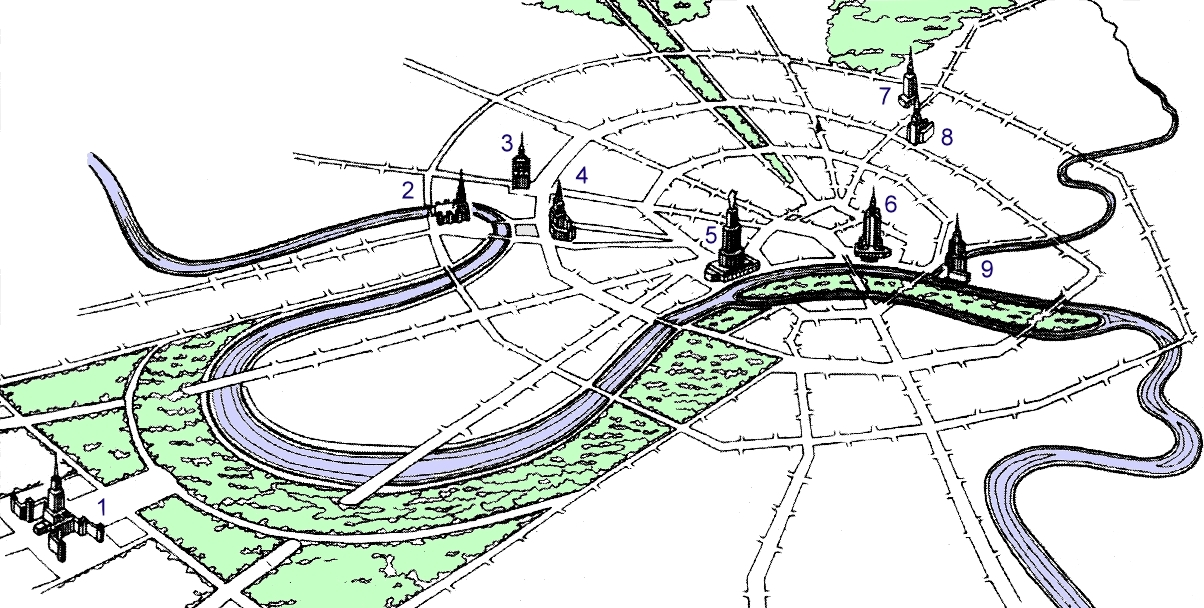
Map of Moscow depicting the Seven Sisters and the city's ring roads

During the late 1930s, the construction industry was experienced enough to build large, multi-block urban redevelopments – although all of these were in Moscow. The three most important Moscow projects were:

- Dorogomilovo (including part of present-day Kutuzovsky Prospekt). Unlike the uniform, tight rows of buildings of Gorky Street, Dorogomilovo road was lined with very different buildings, with wide spaces between them. It was an experimental area for Burov, Rosenfeld and other young architects. These buildings were not as thoroughly engineered as on Tverskaya and wooden ceilings and partitions and wet-stucco exteriors eventually resulted in greater maintenance costs. Yet it is here where the "Stalin's Empire" canon was largely developed.
- Bolshaya Kaluzhskaya (now Leninsky Prospect), a similar development of standard block-wide buildings east of Gorky Park
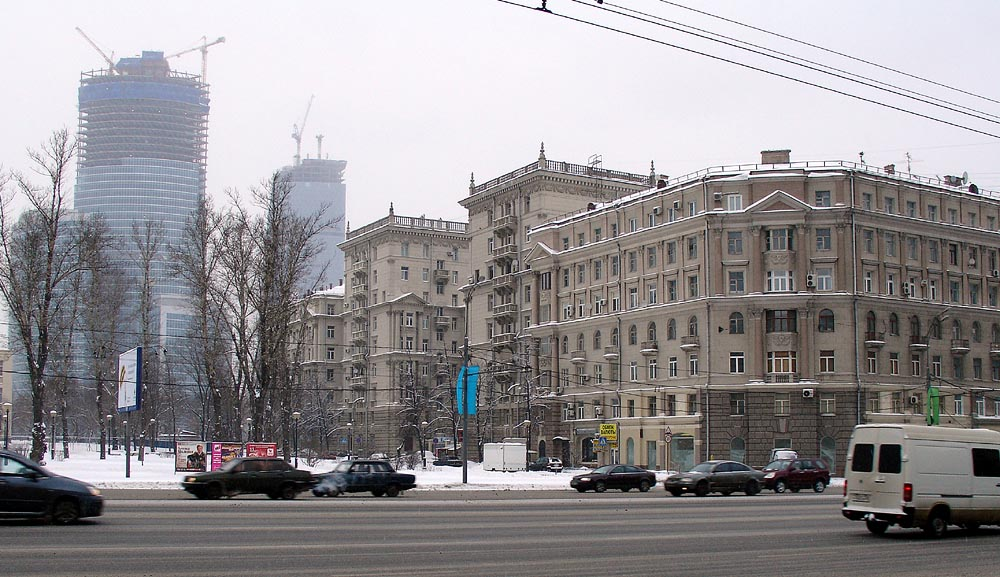
Kutuzovsky 26, Leonid Brezhnev's and Mikhail Suslov's home, Moscow-City behind

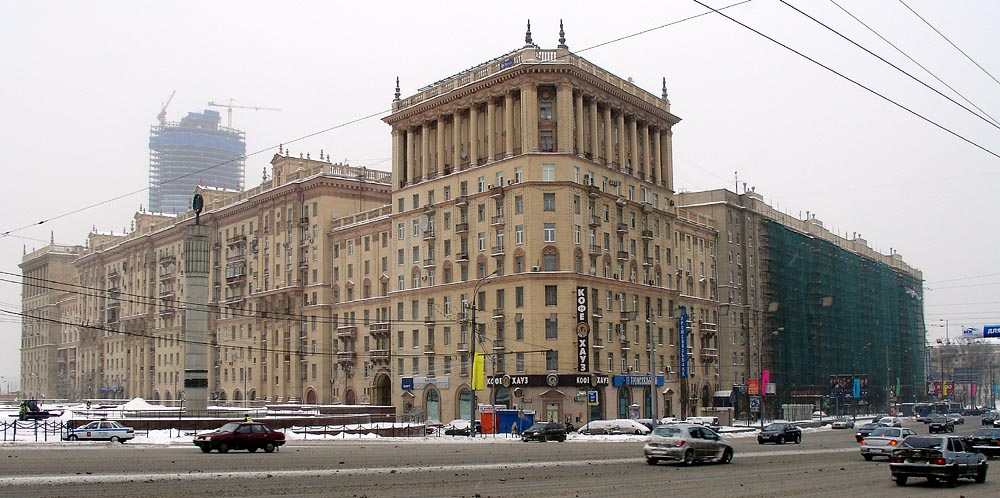
Dorogomilovo West, city "gates"

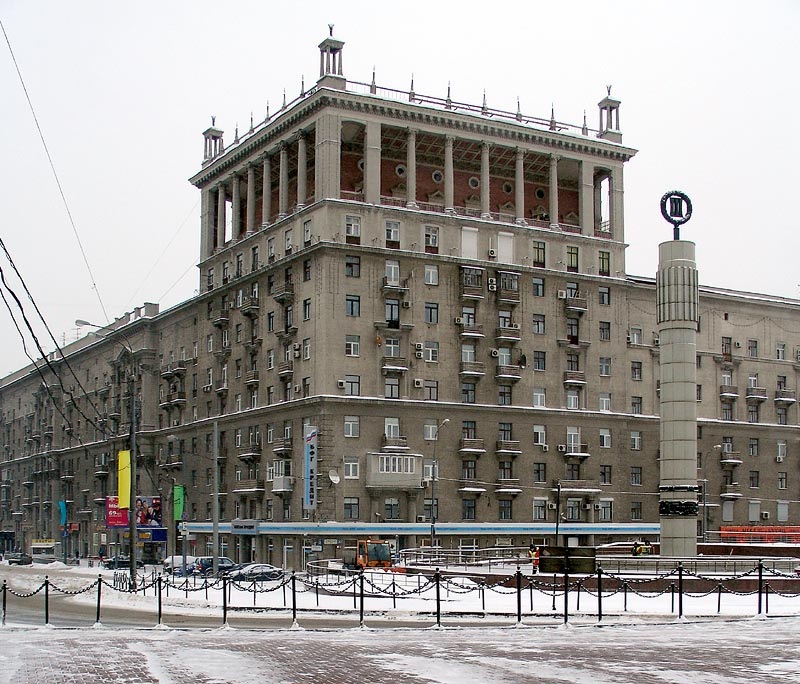
Dorogomilovo West, city "gates"; obelisk added in 1990s

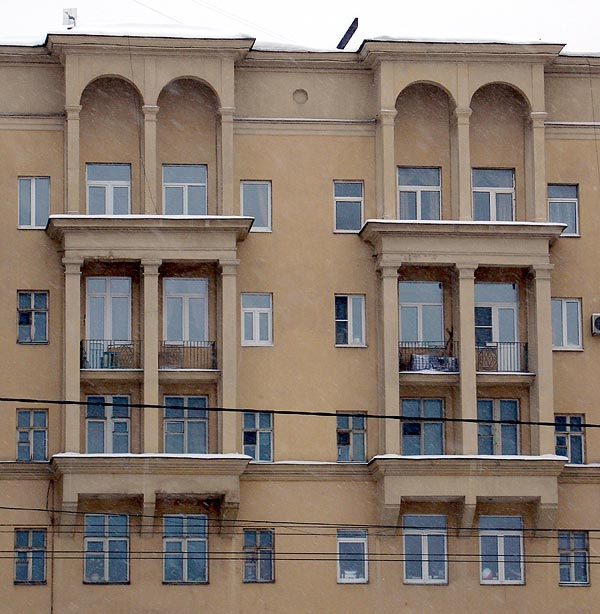
Slim mediterranean arches, typical for 1930s

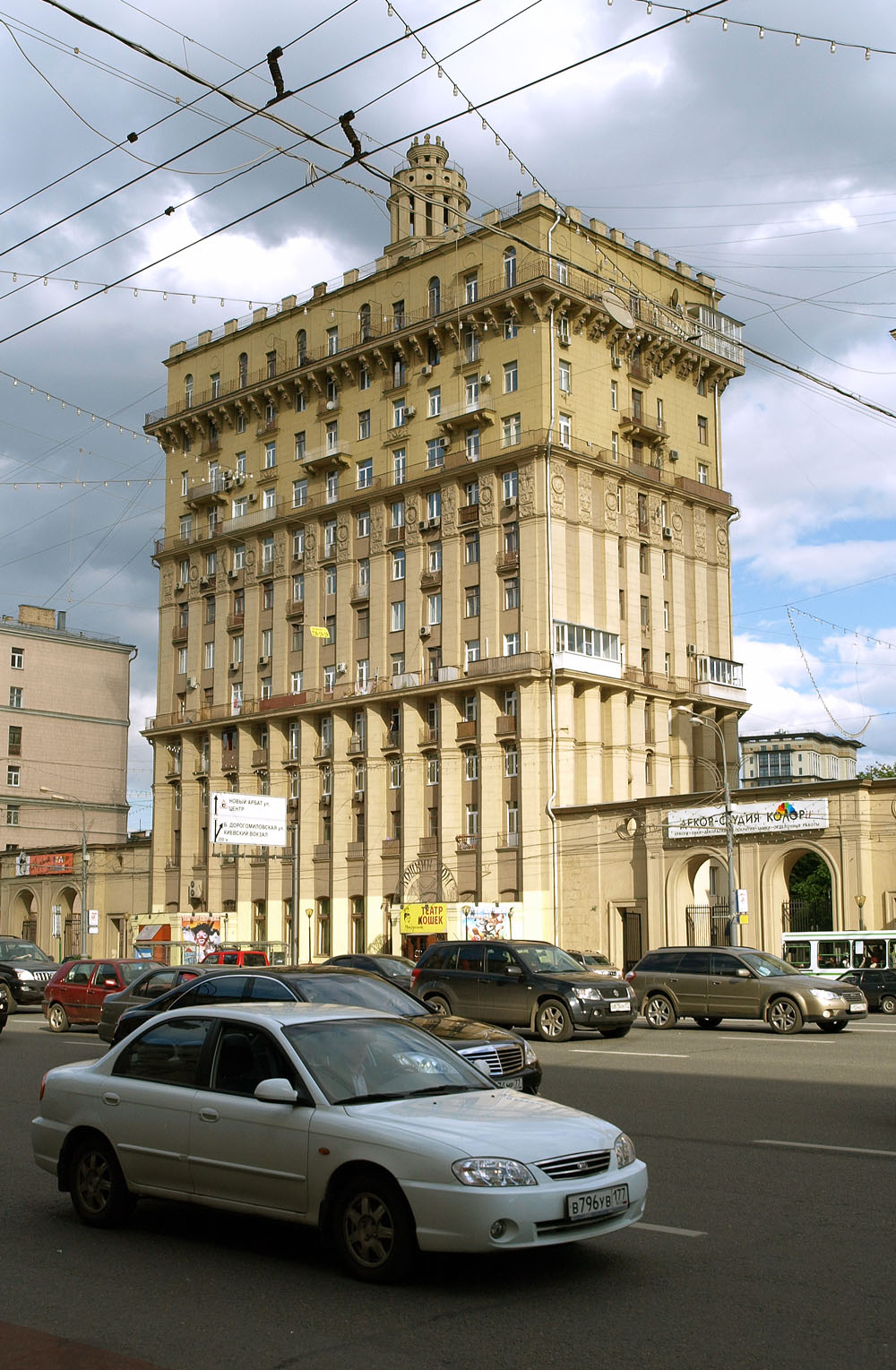
Rosenfeld's twin towers in Dorogomilovo, 1946 completion of 1938–1941 development plan

==== All-Union Agricultural Exhibition (1939) ====
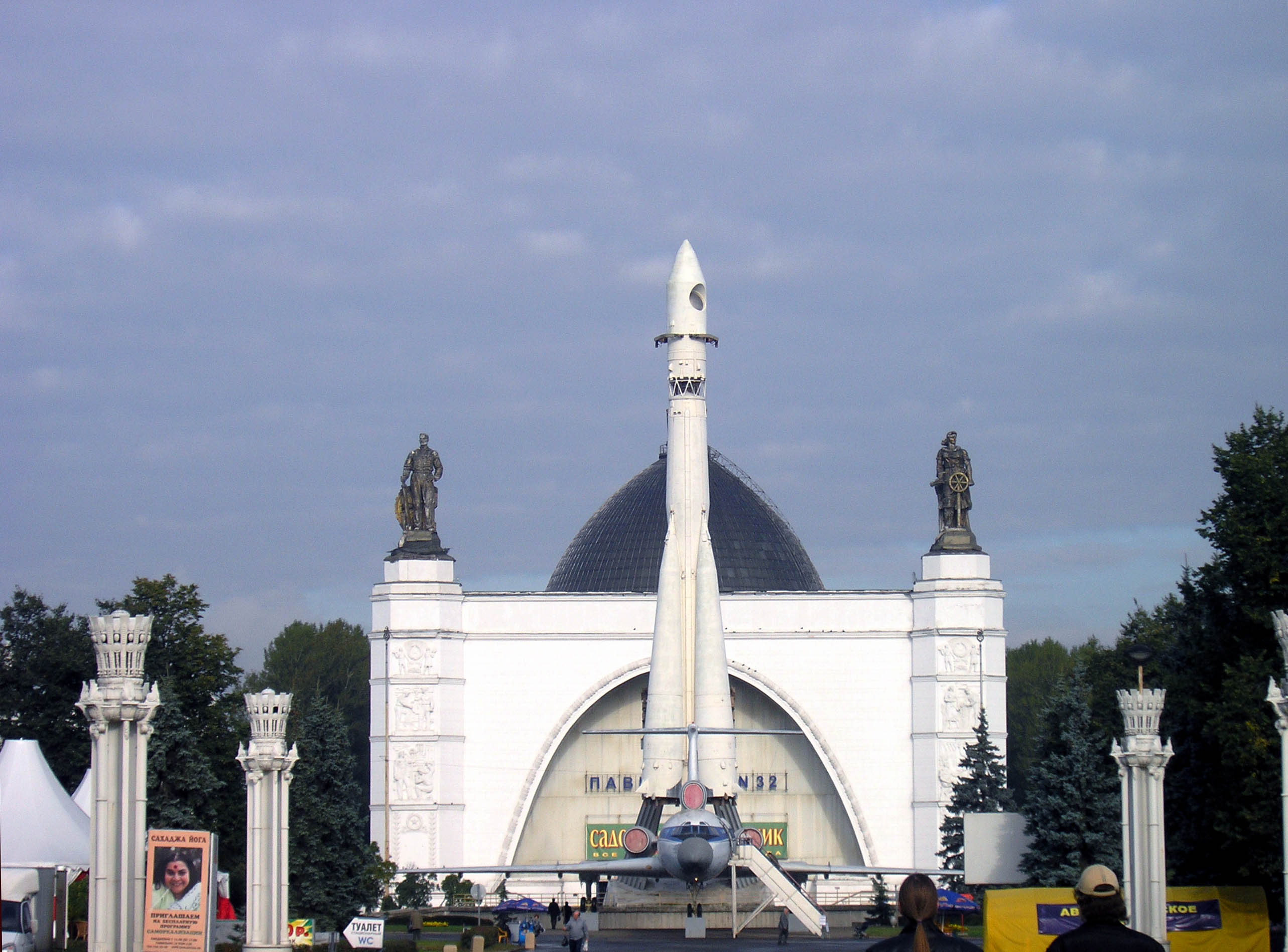
Present-day Cosmos pavilion is one of 1939 originals, remodeled during the 1950s. The rocket shape replaced Stalin's figure (of about the same size).

In 1936, the annual Agricultural Exhibition was relocated to an empty field north of Moscow. By August 1, 1939, more than 250 pavilions were built on 136 hectares (340 acres). A 1937 statue by Vera Mukhina, Worker and Kolkhoz Woman, atop the USSR pavilion of the Exposition Internationale des Arts et Techniques dans la Vie Moderne (1937) (Paris Expo of 1937), was rebuilt at the entrance gates. Pavilions were created in the national styles of Soviet republics and regions; a walk through the exhibition recreated a tour of the huge country. The central pavilion by Vladimir Schuko was based slightly on the abortive 1932 Palace of Soviets draft by Zholtovsky. Unlike the "national" buildings, it has not survived (central gates and major pavilions were rebuilt during the early 1950s).

The surviving 1939 pavilions are the last and only example of Stalin's monumental propaganda in their original setting. Such propaganda pieces were not built to last (like Shchusev's War Trophy Hangar in Gorky Park); some were demolished during the de-Stalinization of 1956.

=== Post-war (1944–1950) ===
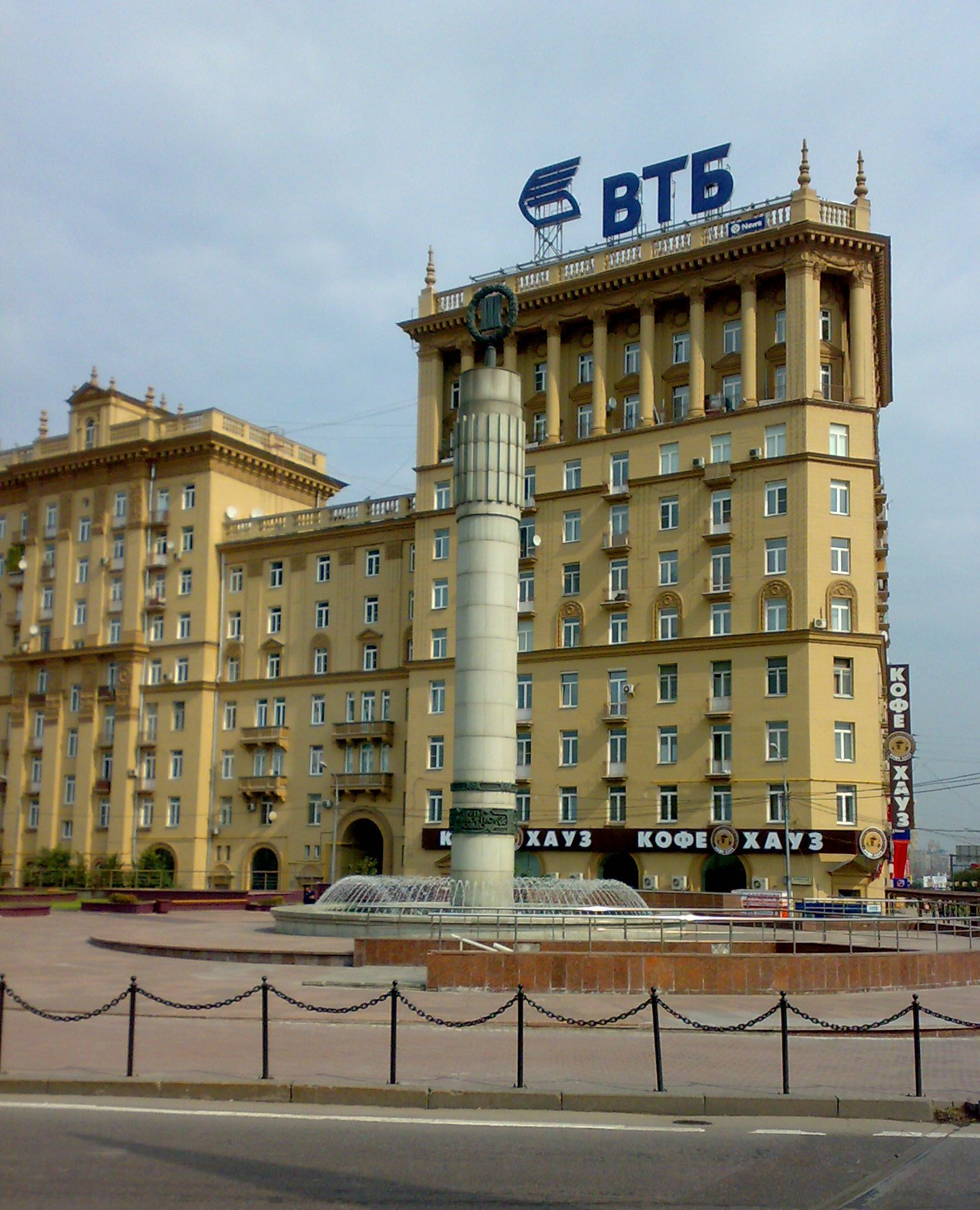
Stalinist apartment blocks in Kutuzovsky Prospekt, Moscow

Post-war architecture, sometimes perceived as a uniform style, was fragmented into at least four vectors of development:

- Luxurious residential and office construction of complete regions such as the Moskovsky Prospekt in Leningrad and the Leninsky Prospekt in Moscow.
- Major infrastructure projects (Metro in Leningrad and Moscow, Volga–Don Canal).
- Rebuilding war damage of Kursk, Minsk, Kiev, Smolensk, Stalingrad, Voronezh, and hundreds of smaller towns.
- The effort for new, low-cost technologies to resolve the housing crises, evident since 1948 and the official state policy since 1951.
- Building of new cities: Novosibirsk, Kemerovo, Dzerzhinsk and elsewhere.

Residential construction in post-war cities was segregated according to the ranks of tenants. No effort was made to conceal luxuries; sometimes they were evident, sometimes deliberately exaggerated (in contrast with Iofan's plain House on Embankment). Country residencies of Stalin's officials was on the top level; so was the 1945 House of Lions by Ivan Zholtovsky (House of Lions was designed by Nikolai Gaigarov and M.M. Dzisko of Zholtovsky Workshop. Zholtovsky supervised and promoted the project), a luxurious downtown residence for Red Army Marshals. 1947 Marshals Apartments by Lev Rudnev, on the same block, has a less extravagant exterior package. There was a type of building for every rank of Stalin's hierarchy.

High-class buildings can be identified easily by tell-tale details like spacing between windows, penthouses and bay windows. Sometimes, the relative rank and occupation of tenants is represented by ornaments, sometimes by memorial plaques. Note that these are all Moscow features. In smaller cities, the social elite usually comprised just one or two classes; St. Petersburg always had a supply of pre-revolutionary luxury space.

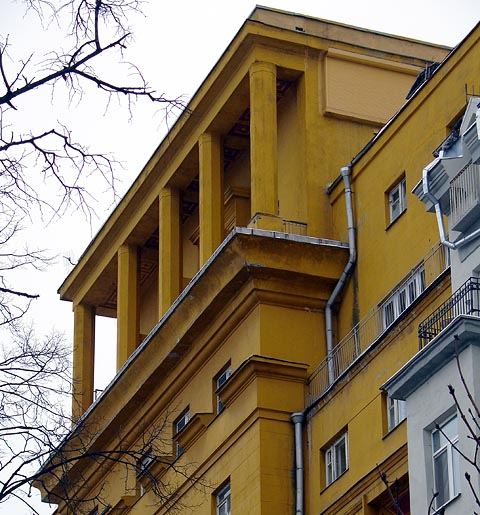
Penthouse, pre-war postconstructivist building by Vladimir Vladimirov

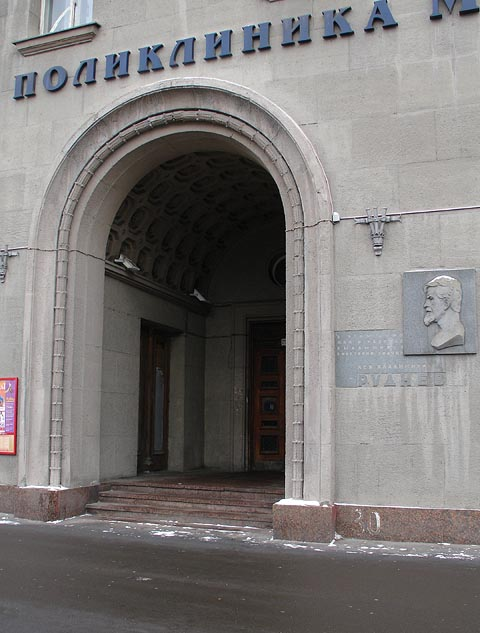
Entrance with side views for security guards; Marshals Apartments by Rudnev, 1947

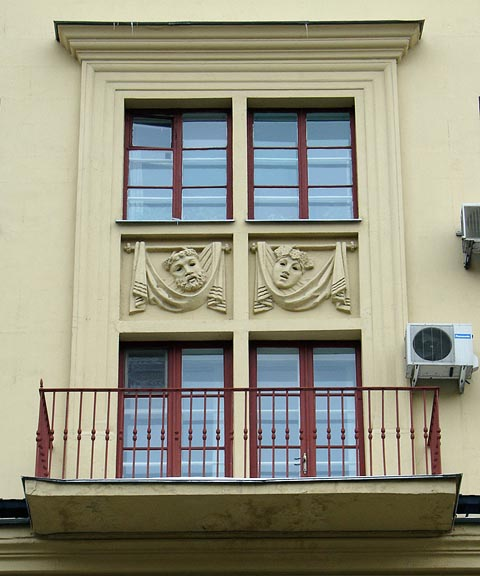
Details indicate social strata – House of Actors, Gorky Street

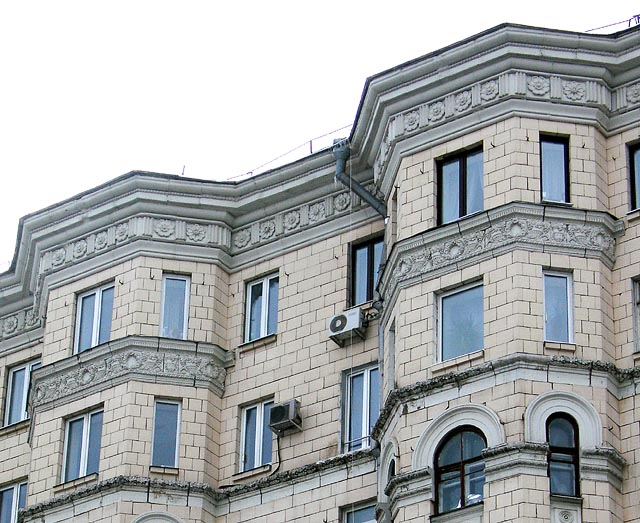
Bay windows, another luxury sign, a late 1952 Rosenfeld block

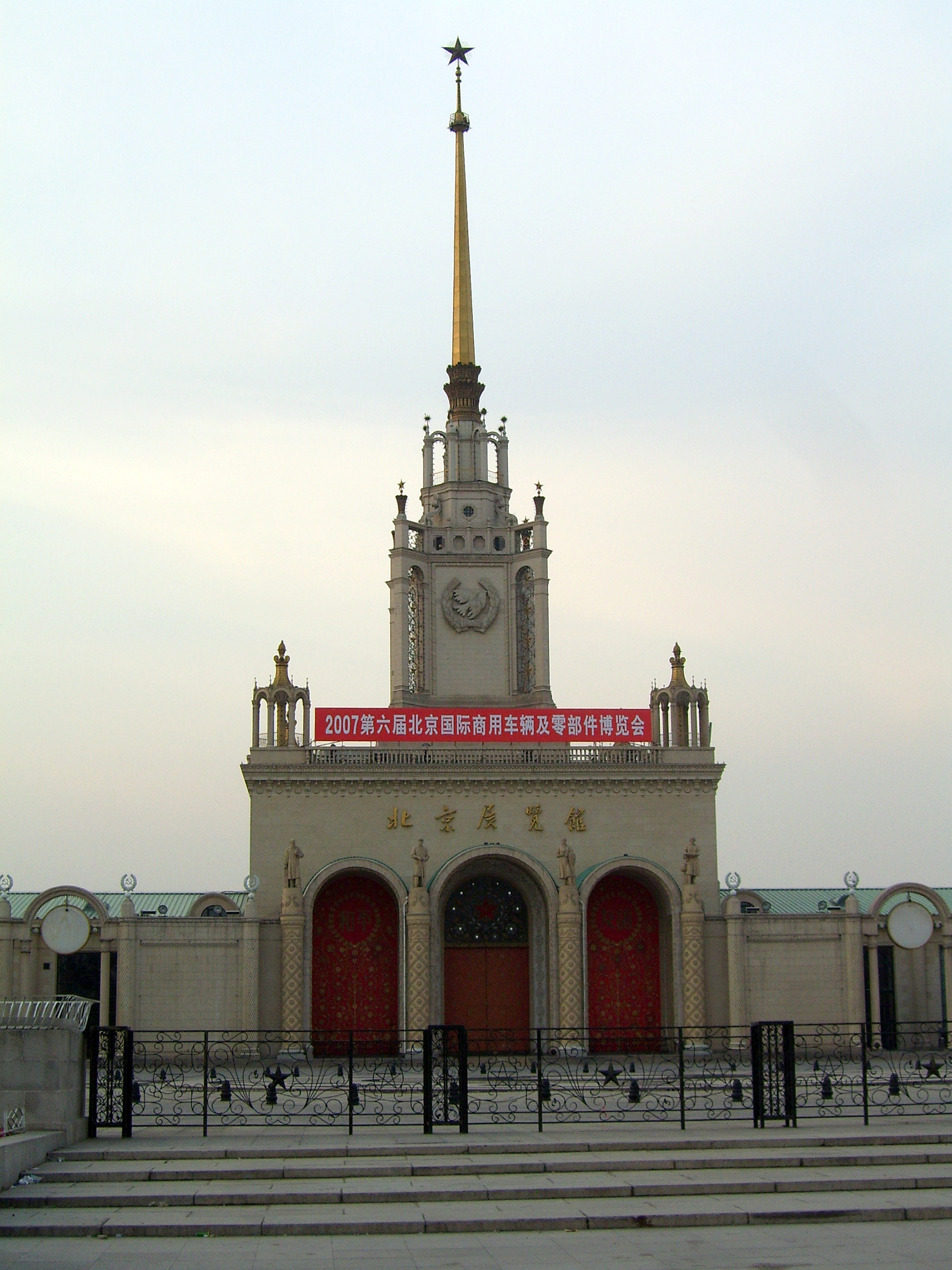
Beijing Exhibition Center, built in 1954

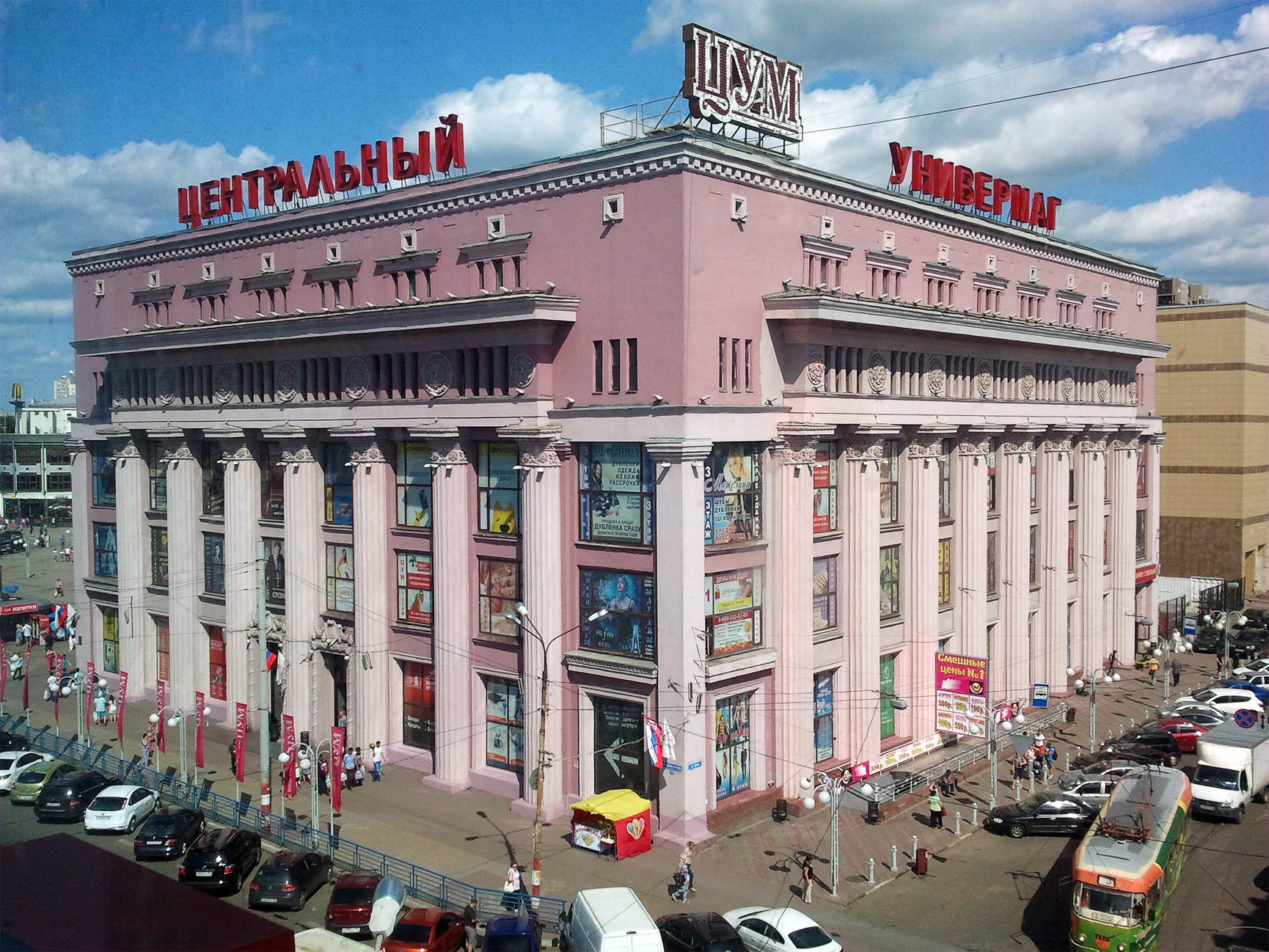
Central Universal Department Store (TsUM), Nizhny Novgorod

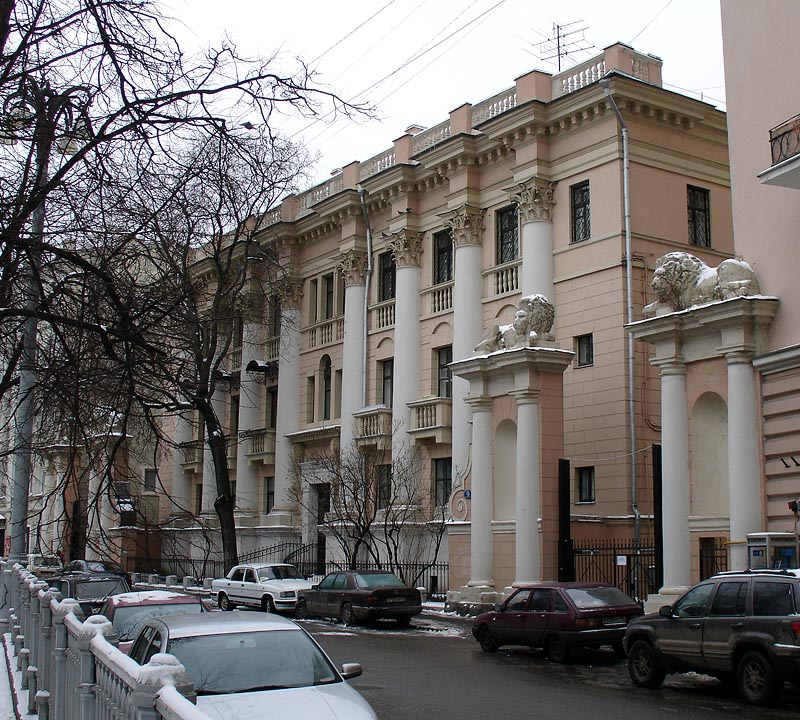
House of Lions, 1945, Patriarshy Ponds, Moscow, downtown residential building

==== Volga–Don Canal (1948–1952) ====
The construction of the present Volga–Don Canal, designed by Sergey Zhuk's Hydroproject Institute, began prior to the Great Patriotic War of 1941–1945, which would interrupt the process. During 1948–1952 construction was completed. Navigation was begun June 1, 1952. The canal and its facilities were predominantly built by prisoners, who were detained in several specially organized corrective labor camps. During 1952 the number of convicts employed by construction exceeded 100,000.

==== Underground Metro (1938–1958) ====
The first stage of Moscow Metro (1931–1935) began as an ordinary city utility. There was much propaganda about building it, but the subway itself wasn't perceived as propaganda. "Unlike other projects, Moscow Metro was never named Stalin's metro". Old architects avoided Metro commissions. Attitudes changed when the second stage work started in 1935. This time, the subway was a political statement and enjoyed much better funding. The second stage produced such different examples of Stalinist style as Mayakovskaya (1938), Elektrozavodskaya and Partizanskaya (1944).

It required six years to complete the first post-war metro line (a 6.4 km section of the Ring Line). These stations were dedicated to "Victory". No more Comintern (the Comintern metro station was renamed Kalininskaya in December 1946), no more World revolution, but a statement of victorious, nationalist Stalinism. Oktyabrskaya station by Leonid Polyakov was built like a Classicist temple, with a shiny white-blue altar behind iron gates – a complete departure from prewar atheism. To see this altar, a rider had to pass a long row of plaster banners, bronze candlesticks and assorted military imagery. Park Kultury featured true Gothic chandeliers, another departure. Metrostroy operated its own marble and carpentry factories, producing 150 solid, whole block marble columns for this short section. The second section of Ring line was a tribute to "Heroic Labor" (with the exception of Shchusev's Komsomolskaya, set up as a retelling of Stalin's speech of November 7, 1941).

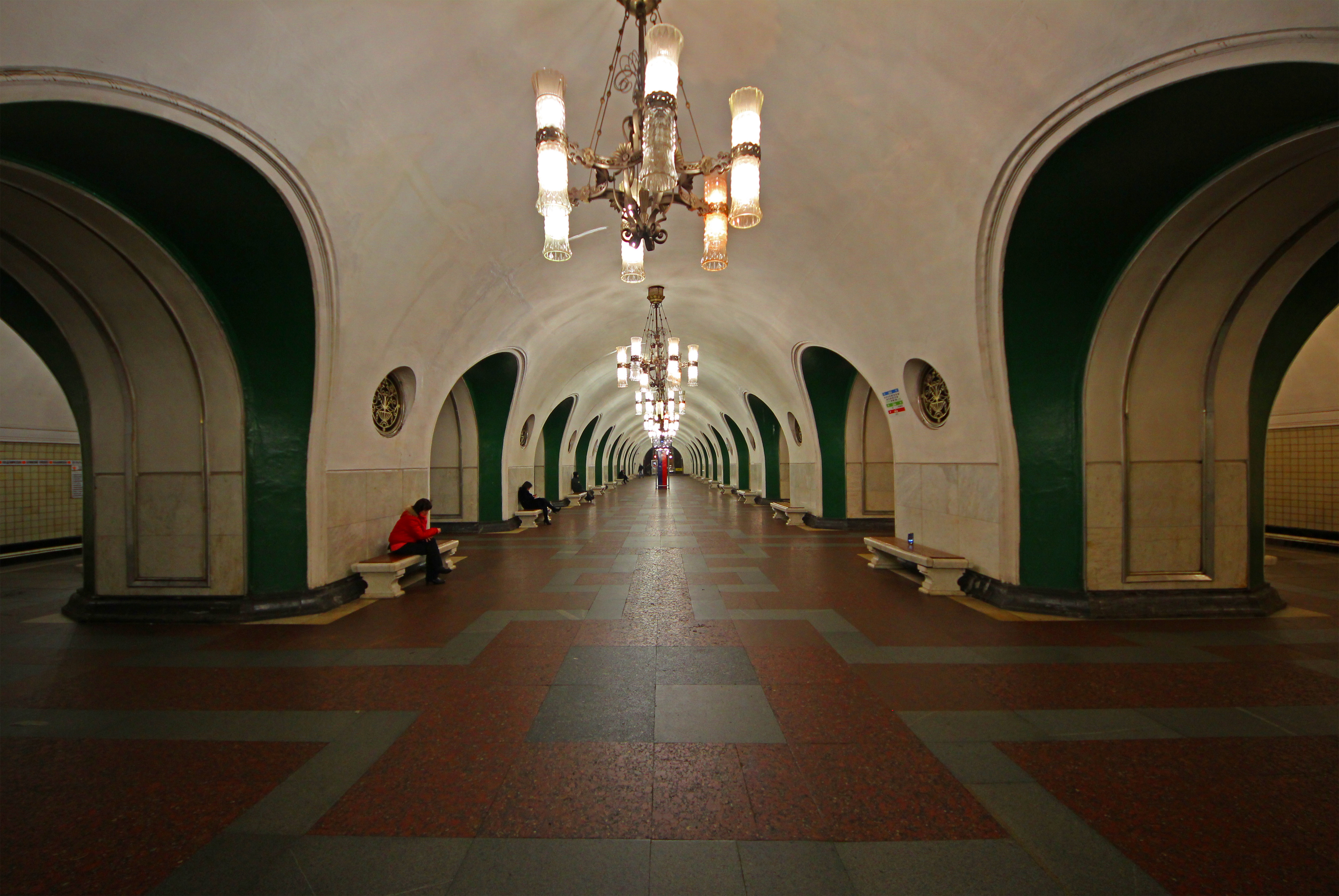
VDNKh, opened in 1958, stripped of "excesses". Green oil paint replaced Favorsky's mosaics.

On April 4, 1953, the public learn that a 1935 stretch from Alexandrovsky Sad, then Kalininskaya, to Kievskaya is closed for good and replaced with a brand-new, deep-alignment line. No official explanation of this expensive change exists; all speculations concern a bomb shelter function. One of the stations, Arbatskaya (2) by Leonid Polyakov, became the longest station in the system, 250 meters instead of the standard 160, and probably the most extravagant. "To some extent, it is Moscow Petrine baroque, yet despite citations from historical legacy, this station is hyperbolic, ethereal and unreal".

Stalinist canon was officially condemned when two more sections, to Luzhniki and VDNKh, were being built. These stations, completed in 1957 and 1958, were mostly stripped of excesses, but architecturally they still belong to Stalin's lineage. The date of May 1, 1958 when the last of these stations opened, marks the end of all late Stalinist construction.

==== Seven Sisters (1947–1955) ====
Stalin's 1946 idea of building many skyscrapers in Moscow resulted in a decree of January 1947 that started a six-year-long publicity campaign. By the time of official groundbreaking, September 1947, eight construction sites were identified (the Eighth Sister, in Zaryadye, would be cancelled). Eight design teams, directed by the new generation of main architects (37 to 62 years old), produced numerous drafts; there was not any open contest or evaluation commission, which is an indicator of Stalin's personal management.

All major architects were awarded Stalin prizes in April 1949 for preliminary drafts; corrections and amendments followed until very late completion stages. All the buildings had overengineered steel frames with concrete ceilings and masonry infill, based on concrete slab foundations (which sometimes required ingenious water retention technology).

Skyscraper projects required new materials (especially ceramics) and technologies; solving these problems contributed to later housing and infrastructure development. However, it came at cost of slowing down regular construction, at a time when the country was in ruins. The toll of this project on real urban needs can be judged from these numbers:

- During 1947, 1948, 1949 Moscow built a total of 100,000, 270,000, and 405,000 square meters of housing.
- The skyscrapers project exceeded 500,000 square meters (at a greater cost per meter)

Similar skyscrapers were built in Warsaw, Bucharest, and Riga; the tower in Kiev was completed without crown and steeple.

The upward surge of the high-rises, publicised since 1947, was recreated by numerous smaller buildings across the country. Eight to twelve-story high towers marked the 4–5 story high ensembles of post-war regional centers. The Central Pavilion of the All-Russia Exhibition Centre, reopened in 1954, is 90 meters high, has a cathedral-like main hall, 35 meters high, 25 meters wide with Stalinist sculpture and murals.

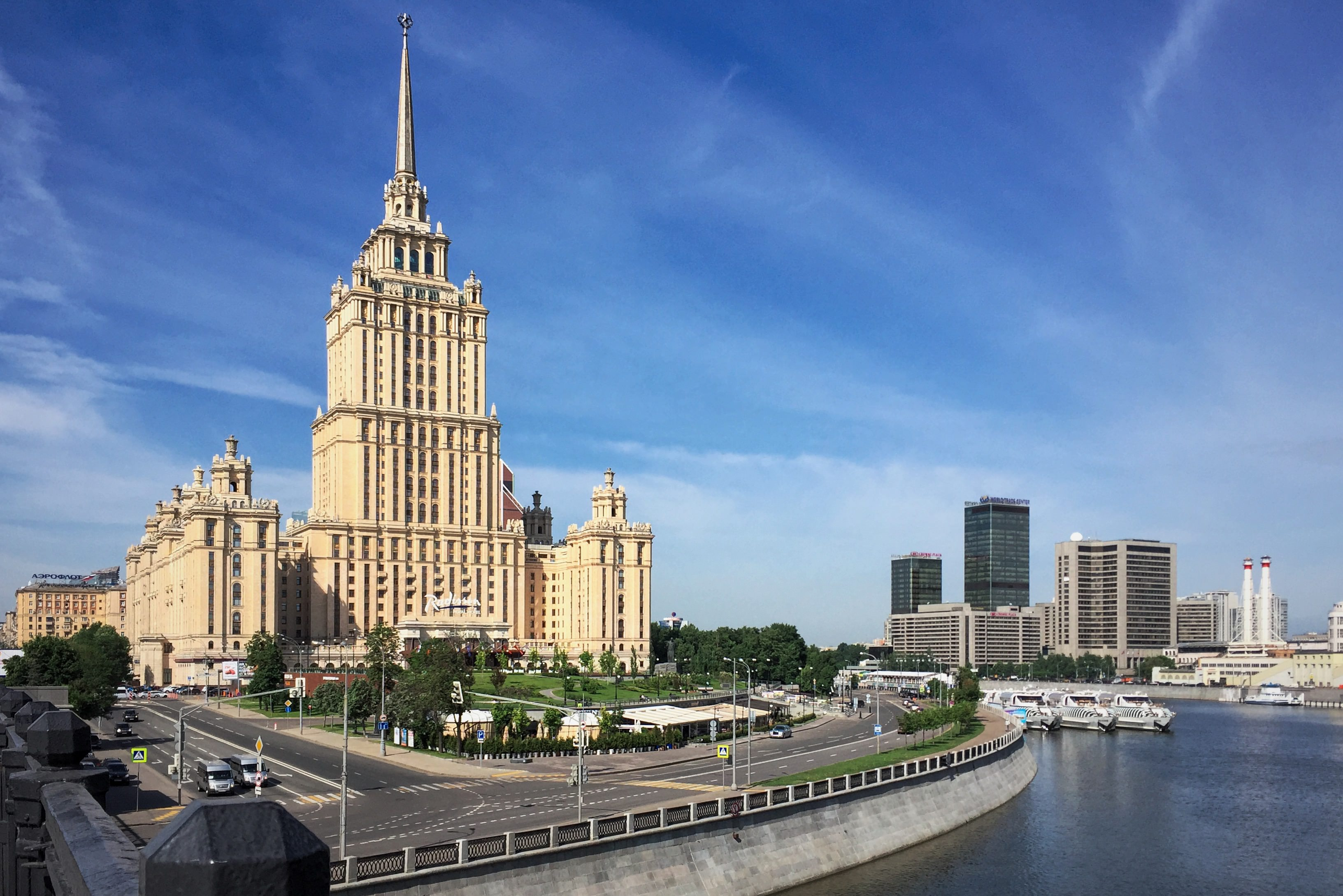
Hotel Ukraina, the tallest hotel in Europe

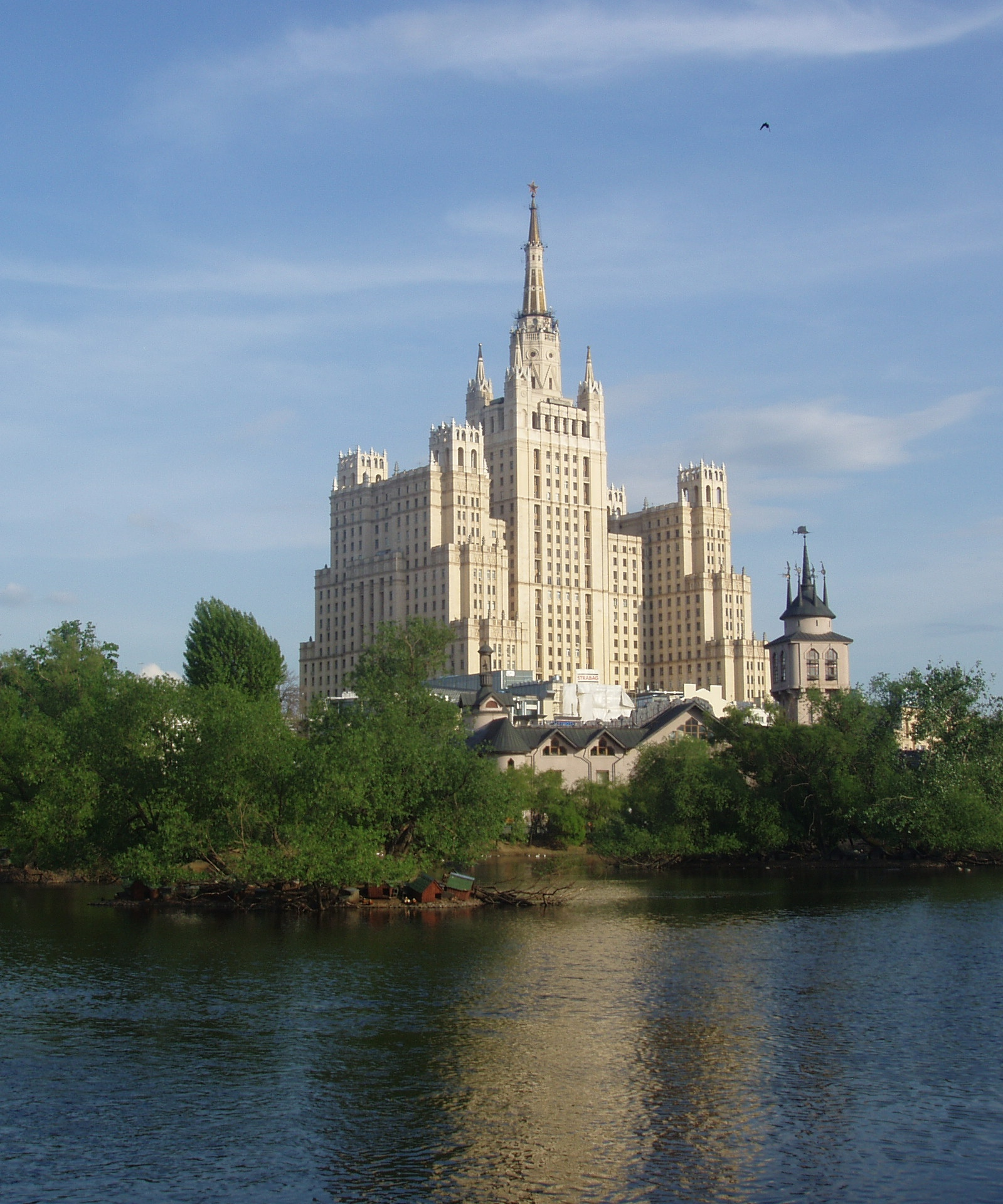
Kudrinskaya Square Building

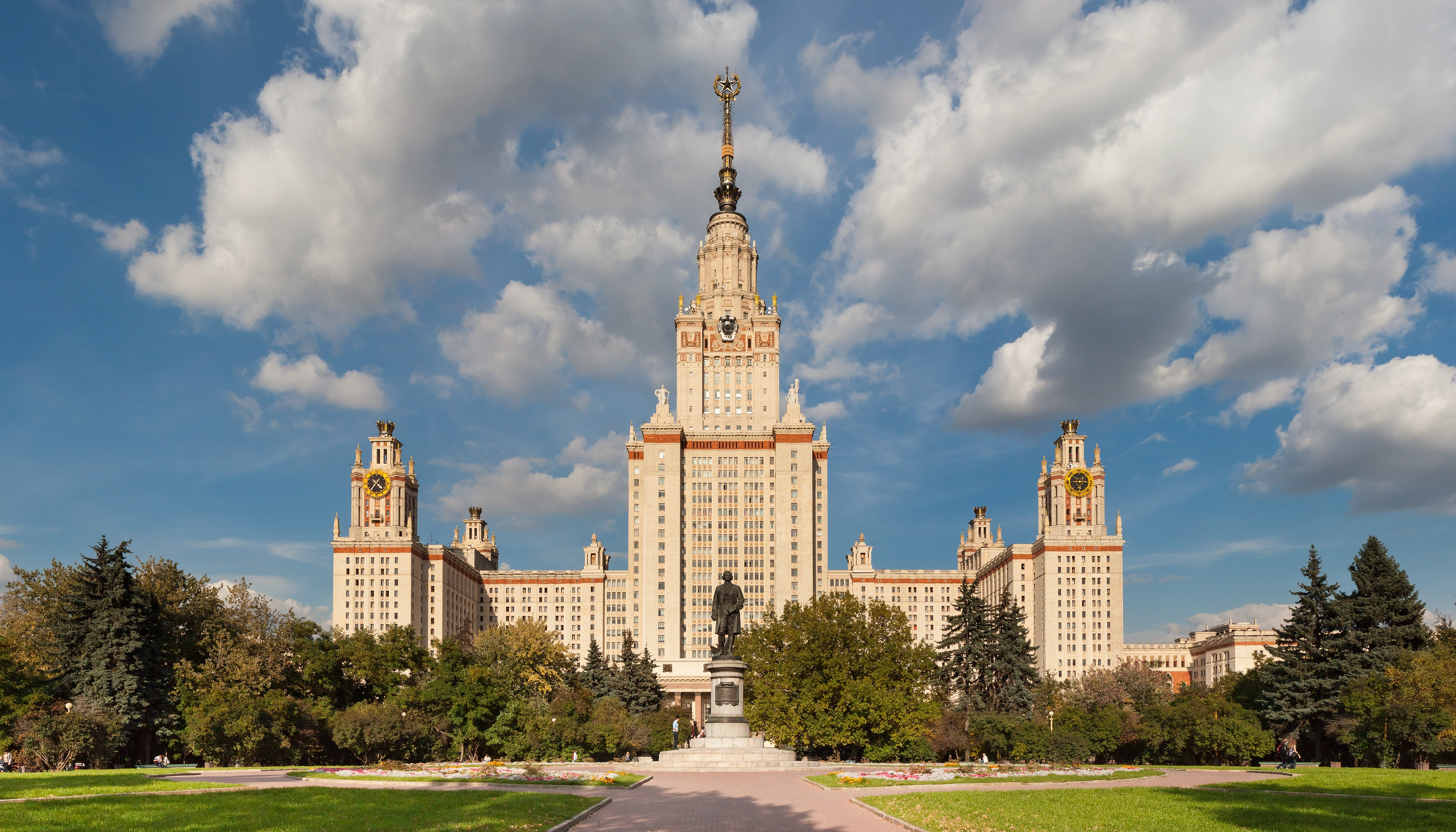
The Main building of Moscow State University, the tallest educational building in the world

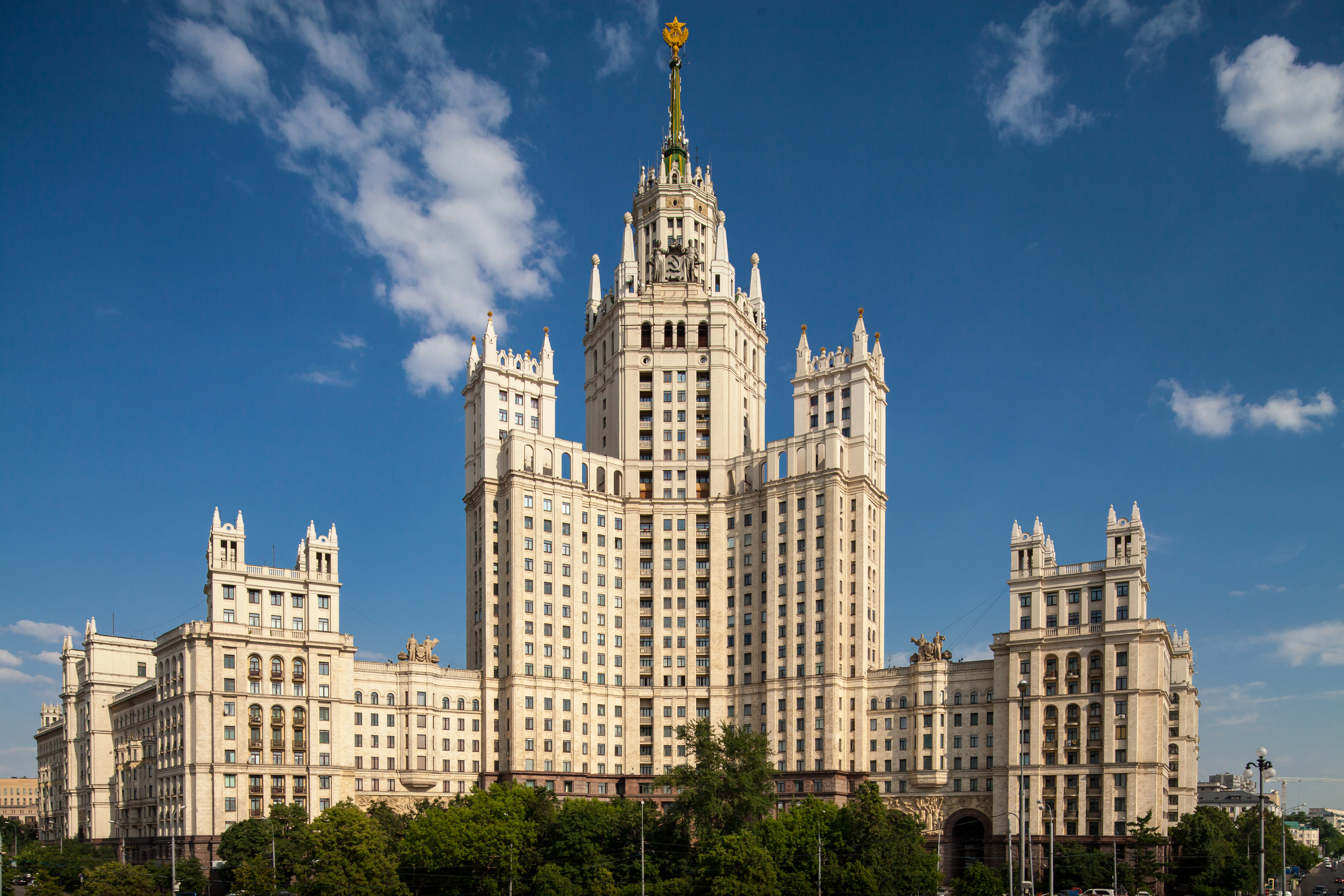
Kotelnicheskaya Embankment Building

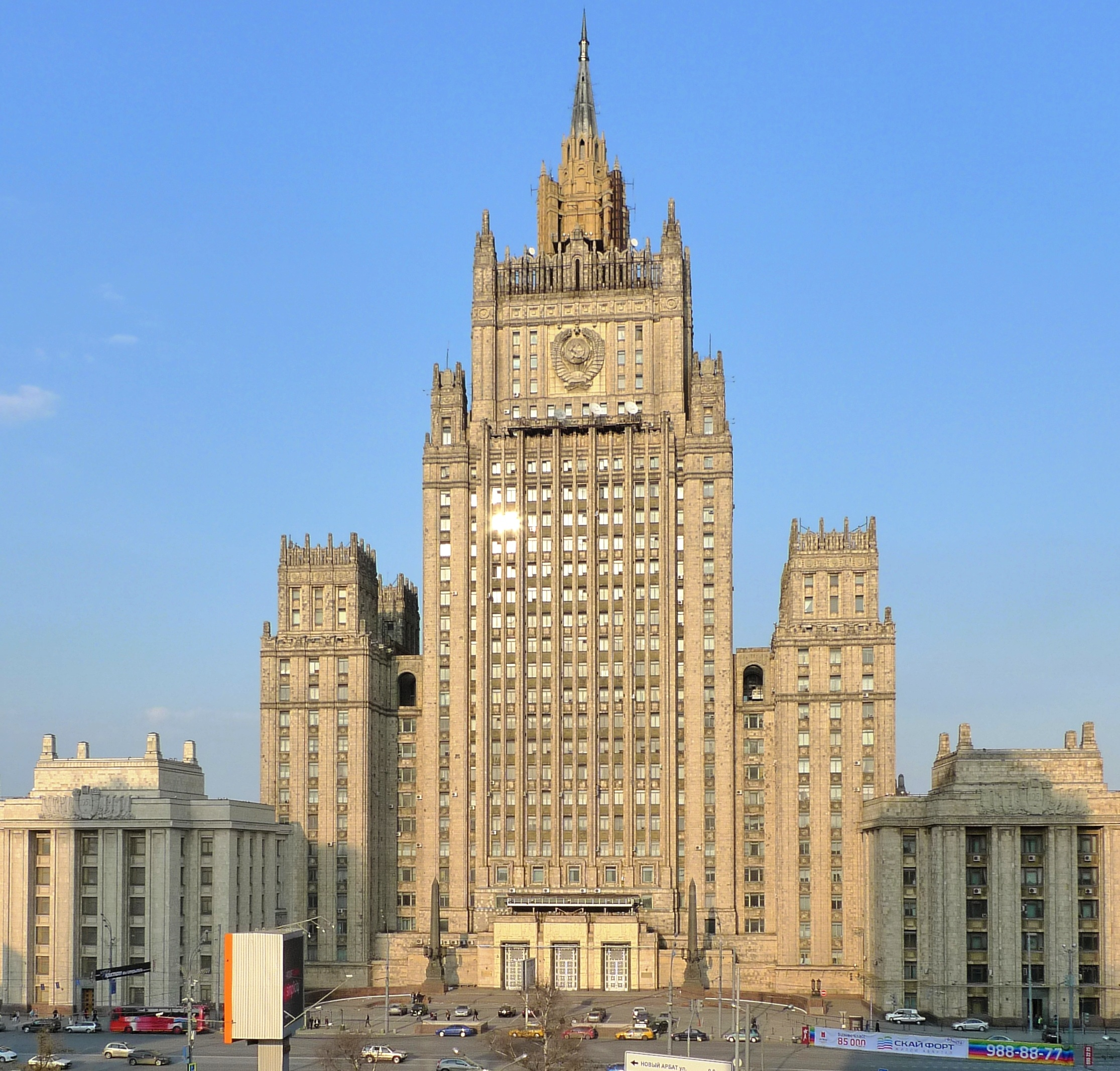
Ministry of Foreign Affairs of Russia main building

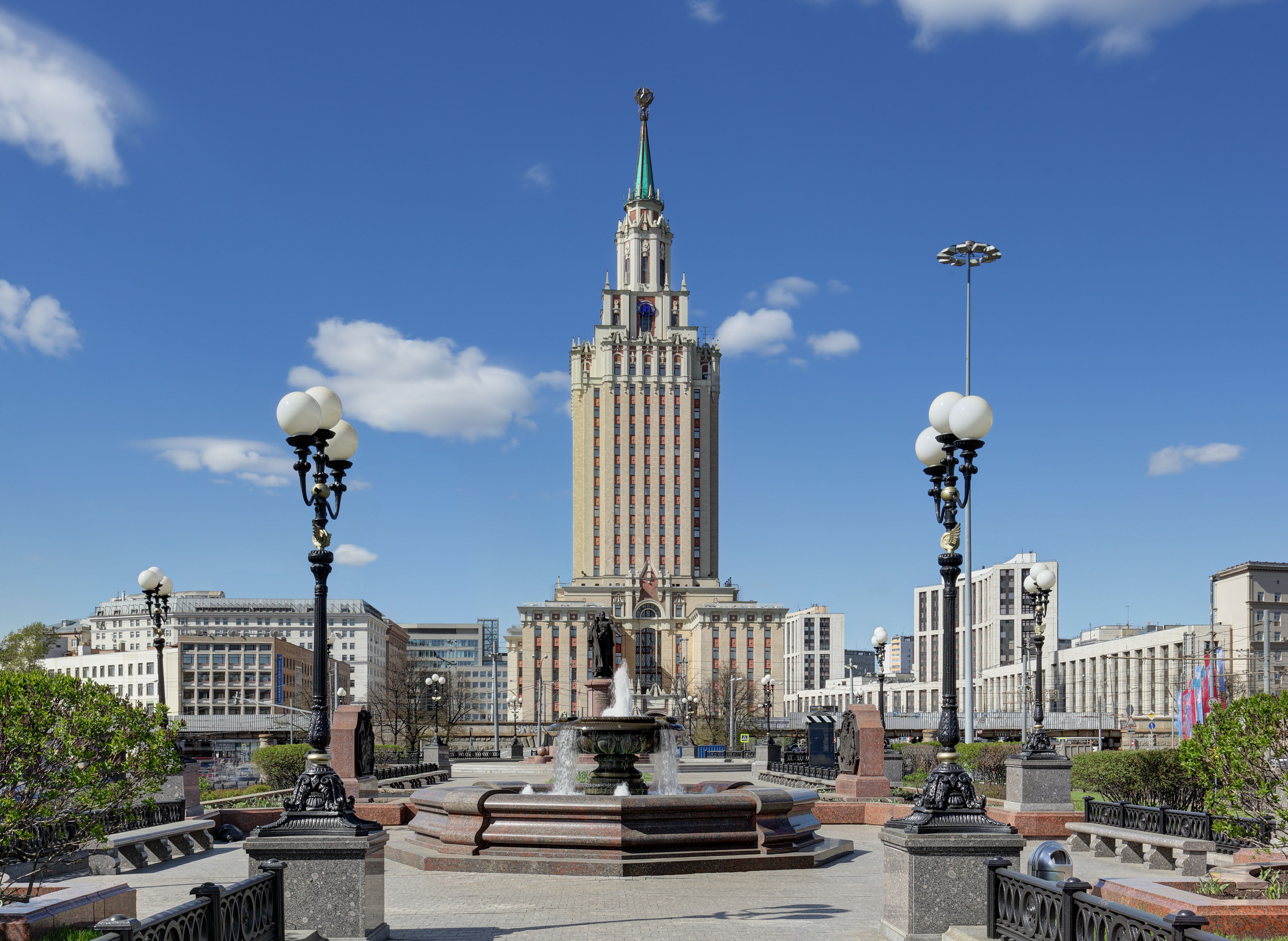
Hilton Moscow Leningradskaya

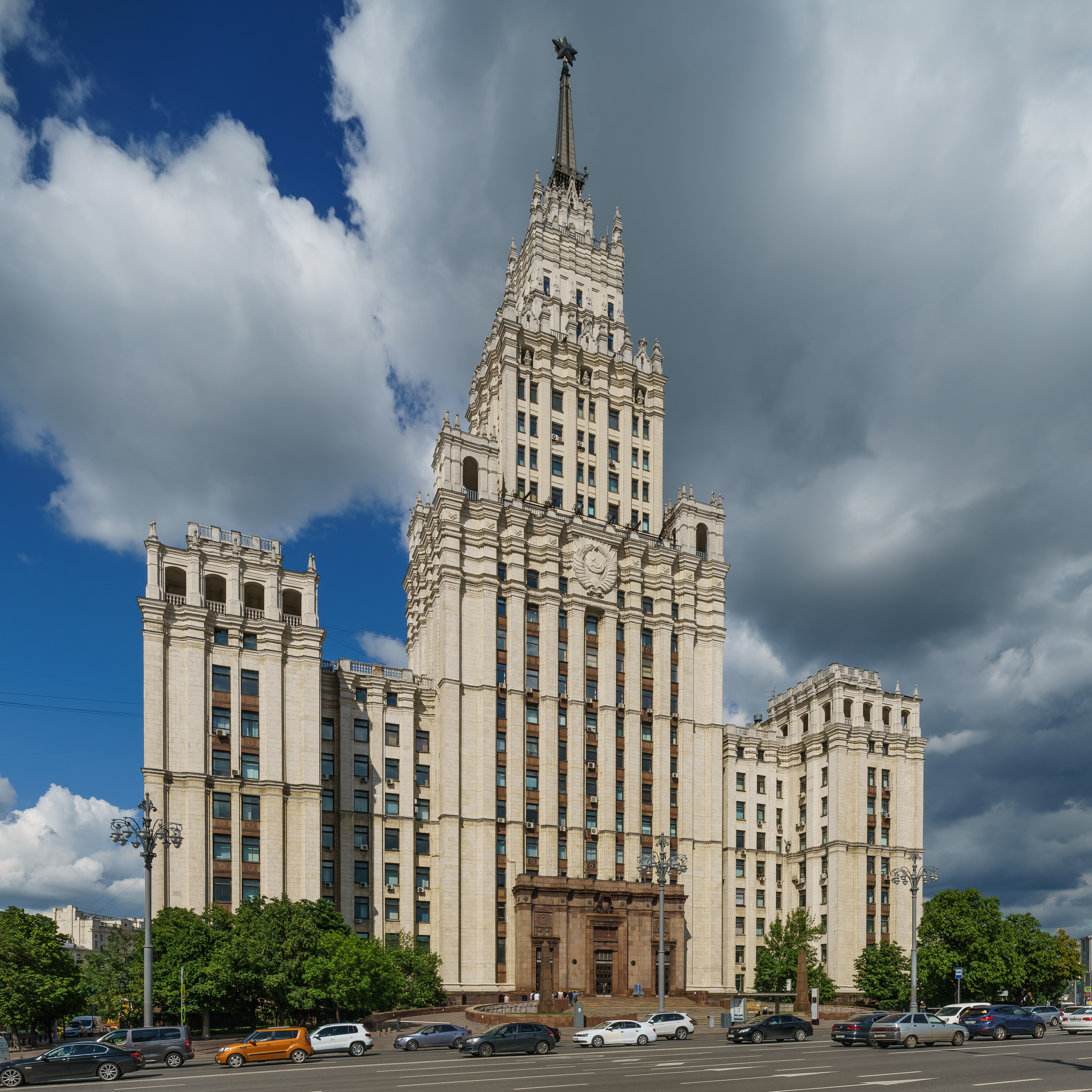
Red Gate Building

==== Independence Avenue in Minsk (1944–1959) ====
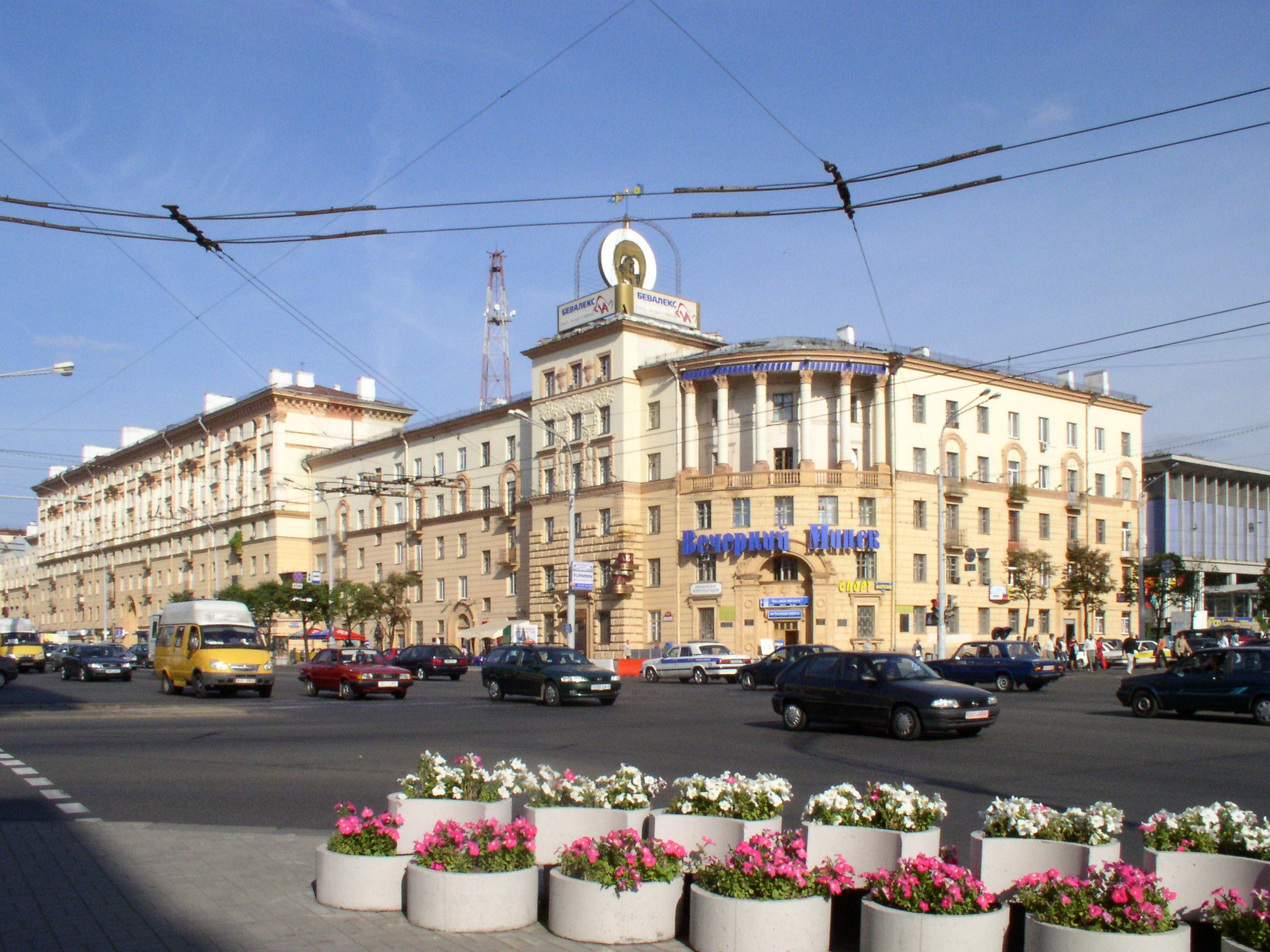
Independence avenue in Minsk

The urban architectural ensemble of Nezalezhnastci Avenue in Minsk is an example of the integrated approach in organizing a city's environment by harmoniously combining its architectural monuments, the planning structure, the landscape and the natural or man-made places of vegetation. The Ensemble was constructed during the fifteen years after World War II. Its length was 2900 metres, although now it stretches to the outskirts of the city totaling nearly 16 km (which makes it one of the longest in Europe). The width of the road including side-walks varies from 42 to 48 metres.

The work on the general layout of the former Sovietskaya Street began in 1944, soon after the liberation of Minsk from the Nazi troops. The main architects from Moscow and Minsk were involved with the project. In 1947, as a result of the competition, the project which had been developed with the supervision of the academician of architecture M. Parusnikov, was selected for the implementation.

The project plan of the Nezalezhnastci Avenue ensemble is a good example. The layout provided for the main features of the town-planning ensemble – the length of the buildings facades, their silhouettes, the main divisions, and the general architectural pattern. The integrated building plan was based on the accommodation of innovative ideas with classical architecture. The survived pre-war buildings and park zones were incorporated into the architectural ensemble.

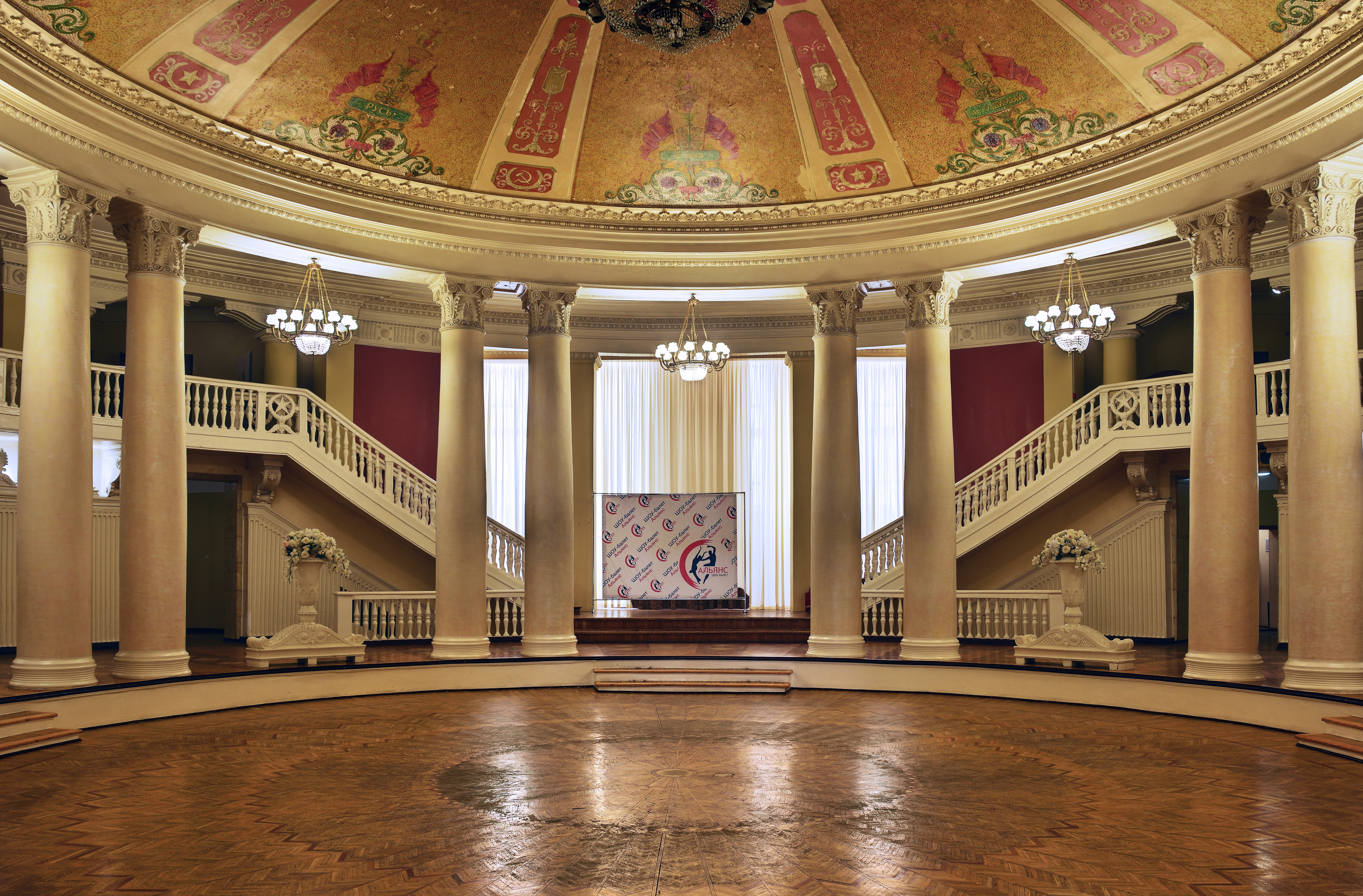
The interior of a Stalinist palace of culture in NizhnyTagil

At present buildings which form the Nezalezhnastci Avenue ensemble are inscribed on the State List of Historical and Cultural Values of the Republic of Belarus. The architectural ensemble itself, with its buildings and structures, the layout and the landscape is protected by the state and inscribed on the List as a complex of historical and cultural values. In 1968 a National Prize in architecture was introduced and it was won by a team of architects representing architectural schools of Moscow and Minsk, (M.Parusnikov, G.Badanov, I.Barsch, S.Botkovsky, A.Voinov, V.Korol, S.Musinsky, G.Sisoev, N.Trachtenberg, and N.Shpigelman) for the design and construction of the Nezaleznosci Avenue ensemble.

The most famous Stalinist architectural ensembles in Minsk are also on Lenina Street, Kamsamolskaya Street, Kamunistychnaya Street, Pryvakzalnaya Square and others.

==== Rebuilding Kiev (1944–1955) ====
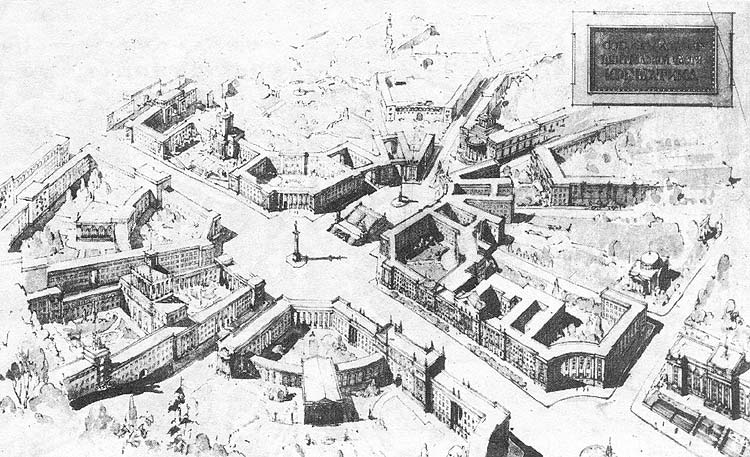
One of the 22 rejected projects for Kiev's reconstruction

Central Kiev was destroyed during World War II when the Red Army abandoned the city and employed remote explosives to detonate bombs, and deny it to German forces. After Kiev's liberation, the streets and squares of the city were cleared of the ruins. Symbolically (as commemoration of Operation Barbarossa, the German invasion of the USSR) on 22 June 1944 the City Soviet organized a competition for architects from Kiev as well as other places from the Republic and the union to develop a new project for a complete reconstruction of the central city.

==== 1949 Stalin Prize ====
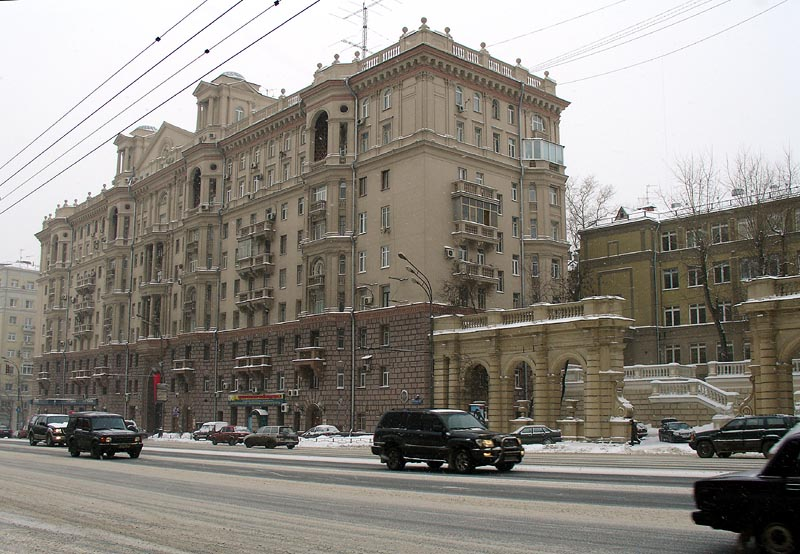
Zemlyanoy Val 46–48, MGB Apartments by Yevgeny Rybitsky, 1949

Stalin Prize for the year 1949, announced in March 1950, showed a clear and present division of Stalinist architecture – extravagant, expensive buildings are still praised, but so are attempts to make Stalinist style affordable. The 1949 prize was given exclusively for completed apartment buildings, a sign of priority. It also demonstrates class stratification of eligible tenants of this time. Three Moscow buildings received awards:

- Zemlyanoy Val, 46–48 by Yevgeny Rybitsky exceeds in exterior luxury, even by 1949 standards. In addition to bay windows, it has elaborate rooftop obelisks, porticos and complex cornices. Even more is hidden inside. It was built for major MGB officials, with 200-meter apartments and a secure 2-level courtyard. Workforce included German POWs; wiring, plumbing and finishes used requisitioned German materials. In 1949, it was praised, in 1952 criticized, and in 1955 Khrushchev condemned it for "particularly large excesses".
- Sadovo-Triumphalnaya, 4 by Rosenfeld and Suris has a quality almost as good. Walls, cut deeply by bay windows and horizontal cornices, are finished in granite and terra cotta. Overall image is so heavyweight, it projects luxury as effectively as Rybitsky's work. A nice design feature is a second set of stairs for the servants.
- Bolshaya Kaluzhskaya, 7 by Zholtovsky is one of the first recognized attempts to decrease costs per unit, while retaining Stalinist standards of quality and masonry technology. Two-room apartments are small by Stalinist standards, yet with plenty of storage space and a smart floorplan that discouraged conversion of single-family units to multi-family kommunalka. Externally, it's a flat slab with modest decorations based on Zholtovsky's Florentine canon; no statues or obelisks, no bay windows.

=== Attempts to decrease costs (1948–1955) ===
A change from Stalinist architecture to standard prefabricated concrete is usually associated with Khrushchev's reign and particularly the November 1955 decree On liquidation of excesses... (November 1955). Indeed, Khrushchev was involved in a cost-reduction campaign, but it began in 1948, while Stalin was alive. A conversion to mass construction is evident in economy Stalinist buildings like Zholtovsky's Bolshaya Kaluzhskaya, 7. Based on masonry, they provided only a marginal gain; there had to be new technology. During 1948–1955, various architectural offices conducted an enormous feasibility study, devising and testing new technologies.

==== Frame-and-panel experiment (1948–1952) ====
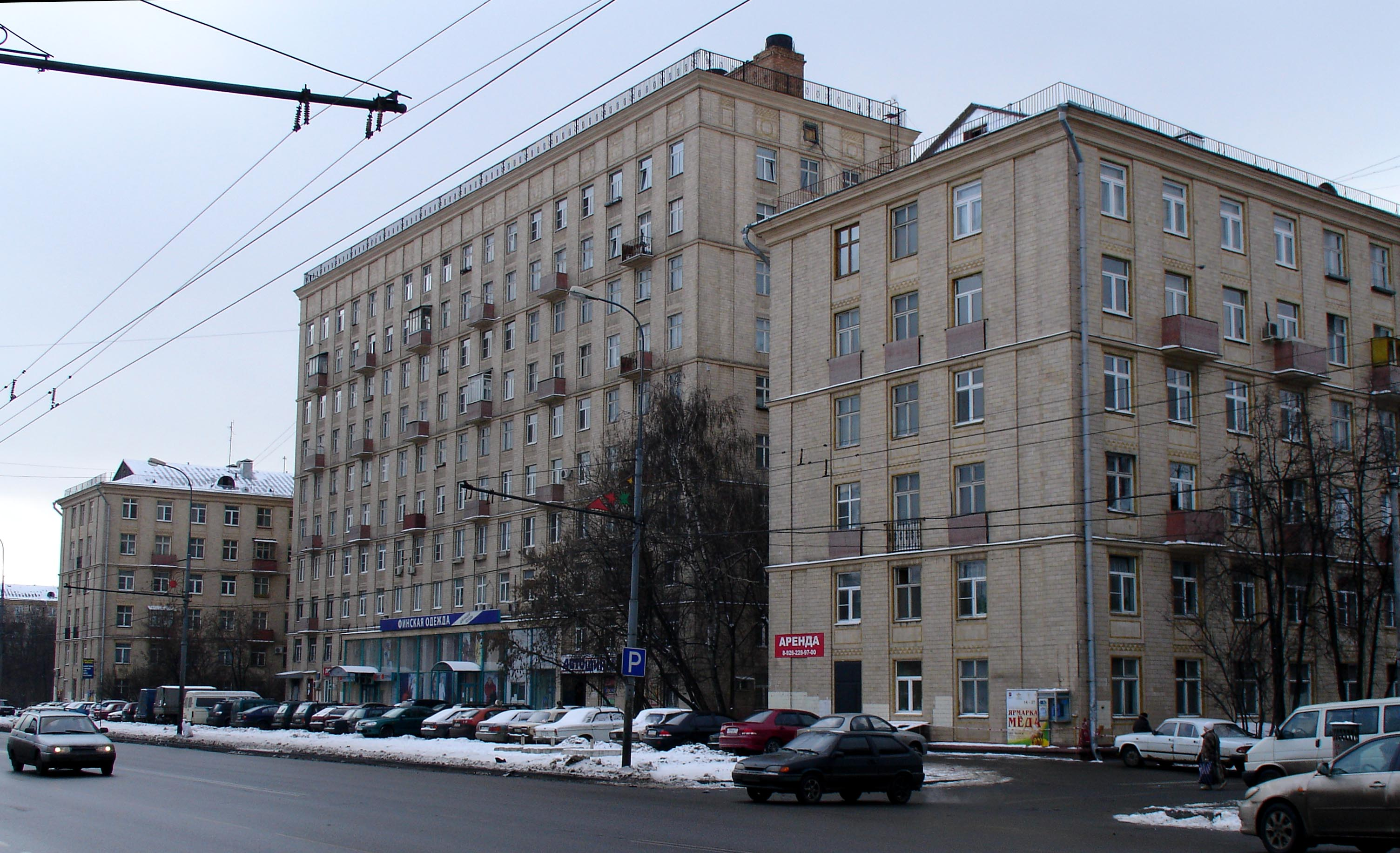
Lagutenko-Posokhin block, Moscow, 1948–1952. Looks like masonry, but is in fact a prefabricated-concrete frame with concrete panel skin.

In 1947, engineer Vitaly Lagutenko was appointed to direct the experimental Industrial Construction Bureau, with an objective to study and design the low-cost technology suitable for fast mass construction. Lagutenko emphasized large prefabricated concrete panes. He joined architects Mikhail Posokhin and Ashot Mndoyants, and in 1948 this team built their first concrete frame-and-panel building near present-day Polezhaevskaya metro station. Four identical buildings followed nearby; similar buildings were built during 1949–1952 across the country. This was still an experiment, not backed by industrial capacity or fast-track project schedules. Posokhin also devised various pseudo-Stalinist configurations of the same building blocks, with decorative excesses; these were not implemented. Concrete frames became common for industrial construction, but too expensive for mass housing.

==== January 1951: Moscow Conference ====
It is not known for sure which Party leader personally initiated the drive to reduce costs. The need was imminent. What is known is that in January 1951, Khrushchev – then City of Moscow party boss – hosted a professional conference on construction problems. The conference decreed a transition to plant-made, large-sized concrete parts, building new plants for prefabricated concrete and other materials, and replacement of wet masonry technology with fast assembly of prefabricated elements. The industry still had to decide – should they use big, story-high panels, or smaller ones, or maybe two-story panels, as Lagutenko tried in Kuzminki? Basic technology was set, feasibility studies continued. A year later, this line of action – establishing prefabricated concrete plants – was made a law by the XIX Party Congress, Stalin attending. Major public buildings and elite housing were not affected yet.

==== Peschanaya Square (1951–1955) ====
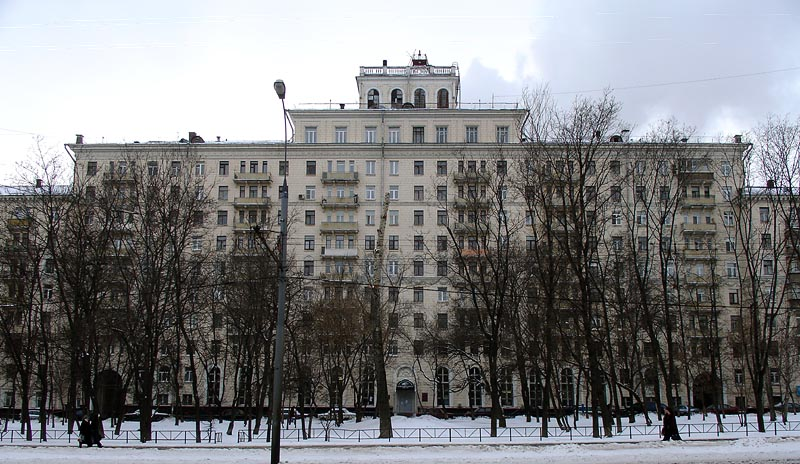
Rosenfeld's Peschanaya Street project, Moscow, 1951–1955; masonry, with prefabricated concrete exterior details

A different type of experiment concerned the improvement of project management, switching from a single-building to a multi-block project scale. This was tested in the Peschanaya Square development (a territory north from the 1948 Posokhin-Lagutenko block). Using the 'flow methode' of moving crews through a sequence of buildings in different completion stages and a moderate application of prefabricated concrete on otherwise traditional masonry, builders managed to complete typical 7-storey buildings in five to six months. Instead of wet stucco (which caused at least two months of delay), these buildings are finished with open brickwork outside and a drywall inside; from a quality of life consideration, these are true – and the last – Stalinist buildings.

=== The end of Stalinist architecture (November 1955) ===
When Stalin was alive, luxury empire and mass construction coexisted; endorsement of Lagutenko did not mean demise for Rybitsky. It changed in November 1954, when critics openly criticized the "excesses" and the will to build 10–14 storey buildings, Stalin's own will; according to Khmelnitsky, this must have been started by Khrushchev personally. Throughout the next year the campaign grew, preparing the public for an end of Stalinism.

The decree On liquidation of excesses... (November 4, 1955) provides some data on the cost of Stalinist excesses, estimated at 30–33% of total costs. Certainly, these examples were selected carefully, but they are reasonable. Alexey Dushkin and Yevgeny Rybitsky received special criticism for triple cost overruns and luxurious floor plans; Rybitsky and Polyakov were deprived of their Stalin Prizes. This was followed with specific orders to develop standardized designs and install an Institute of Standardized Buildings instead of the former Academy.

Stalinist architecture continued for five more years – work on old buildings was not a top priority anymore. Some were redesigned; some, structurally complete, lost the "excesses". The last Stalinist building, the Hotel Ukrayina in Kiev, was completed in 1961.

== Regional varieties ==
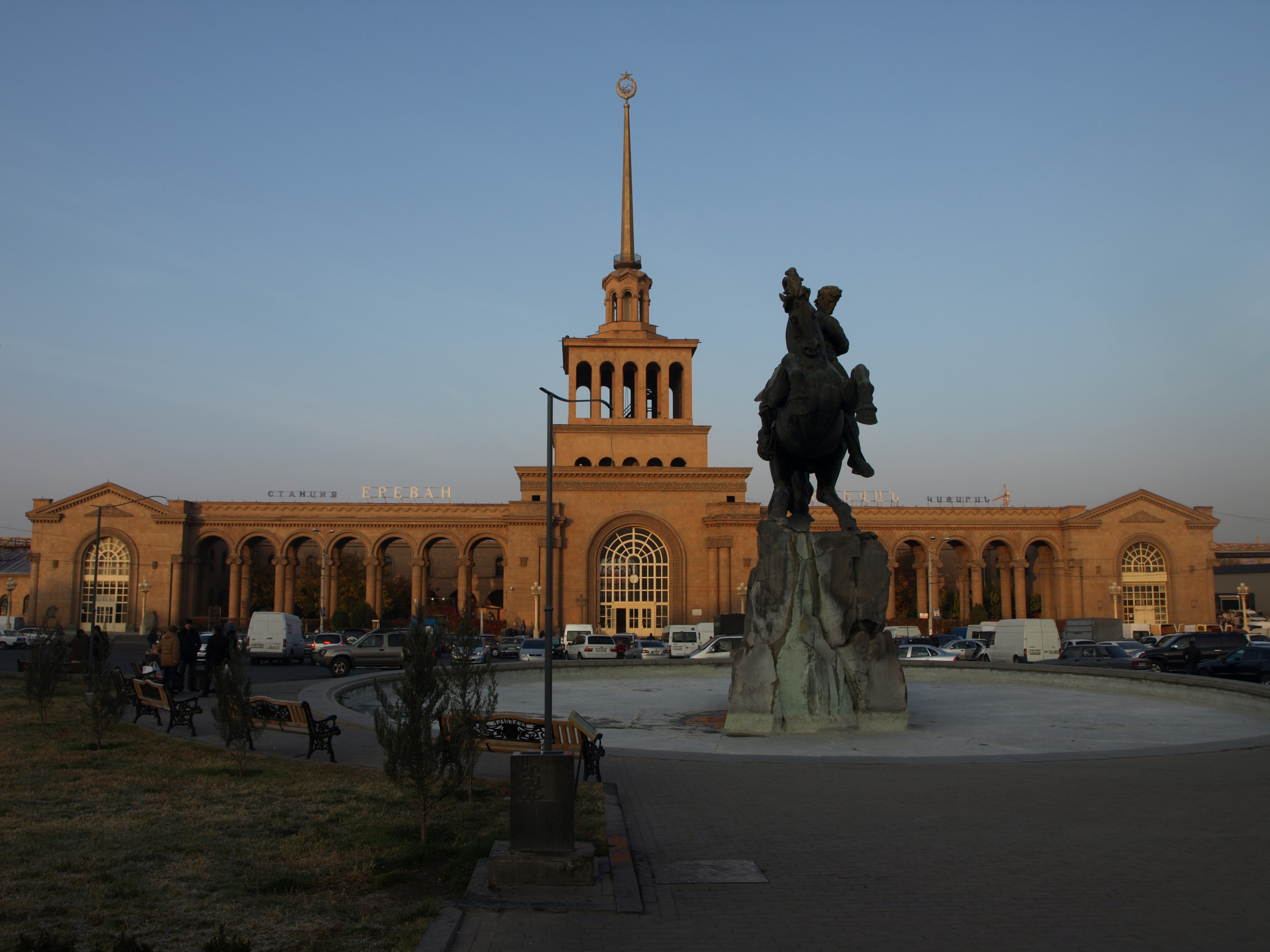
The Yerevan railway station

The national republics of the USSR were entitled to develop their own Stalinist styles, with more or less freedom. When local forces were not enough, Russian architects were summoned (Shchusev designed an oriental-looking theater in Tashkent, etc.). Alexander Tamanian, appointed as the chief architect of Yerevan, is largely responsible for the Armenian variety of Stalinist architecture. A prominent example is the Yerevan railway station, which was completed in 1956.

Stalinist architecture was, from about 1948 to 1956, employed by the post-war Eastern Bloc 'People's Democracies', usually after defeating internal Modernist opposition. This would sometimes show certain local influences, though was frequently regarded as a Soviet import.

=== Poland ===
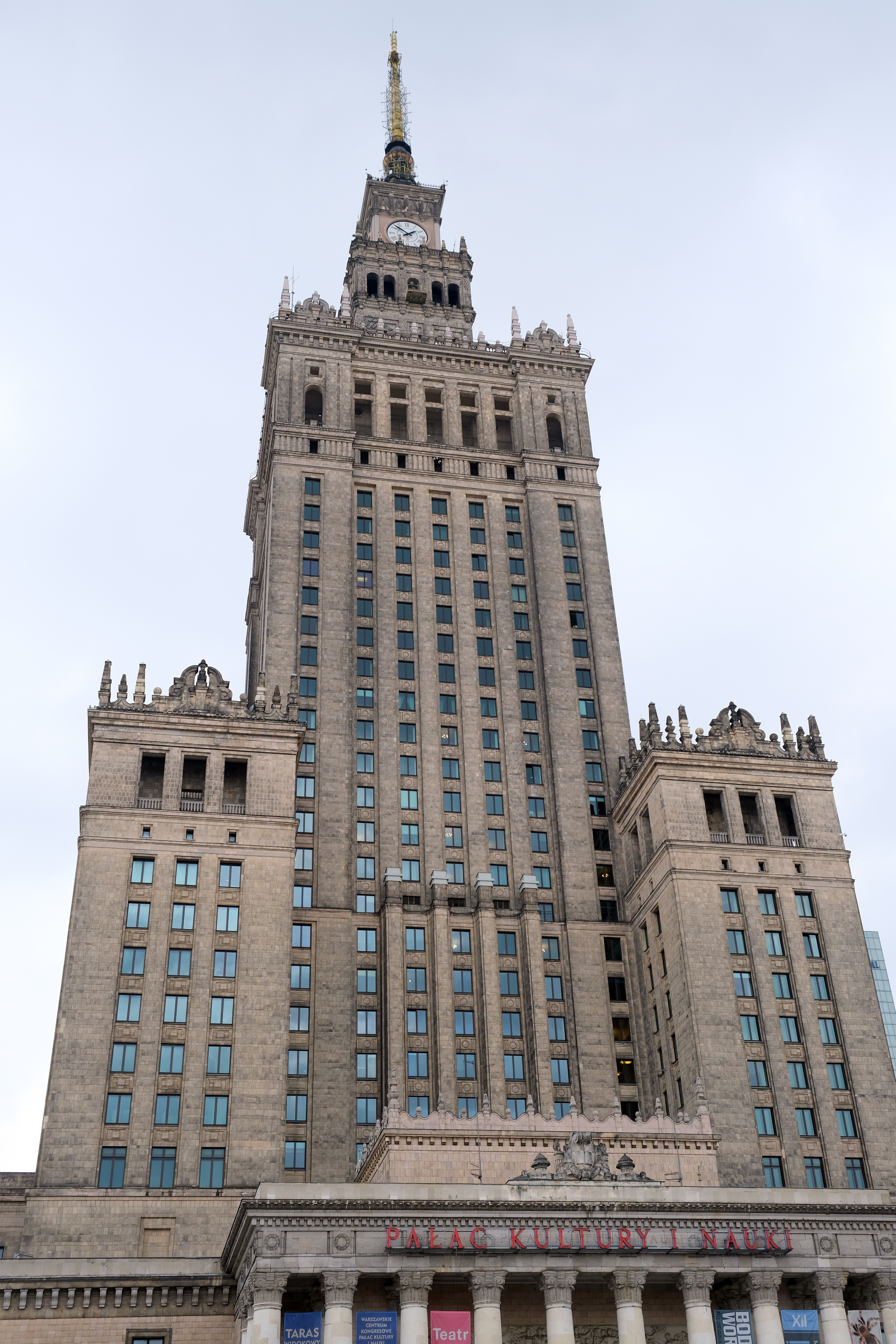
Palace of Culture and Science in Warsaw, dubbed a 'gift from the Soviet people', perhaps the most controversial icon of Stalinist architecture

Lev Rudnev's Palace of Culture and Science, which was dubbed a 'gift from the Soviet people', was perhaps the most controversial of the importations of Stalinist architecture. This vast, high tower, which is still the fourth largest building in the European Union, dominated the city. However an earlier exercise in Neoclassicism was the large MDM Boulevard, which was developed in parallel with the faithful reconstruction of the old town centre. MDM was a typical Stalinist 'Magistrale', with the generous width of the street often rumoured to be for the purposes of tank movements. The planned city of Nowa Huta outside Kraków was also designed in a Stalinist style during the late 1940s. Between 1949 and 1955, numerous plans were drawn up for the socialist reconstruction of the devastated city of Wrocław (German: Breslau, incorporated into Poland in 1945), including the construction of a large university district.

=== East Germany ===
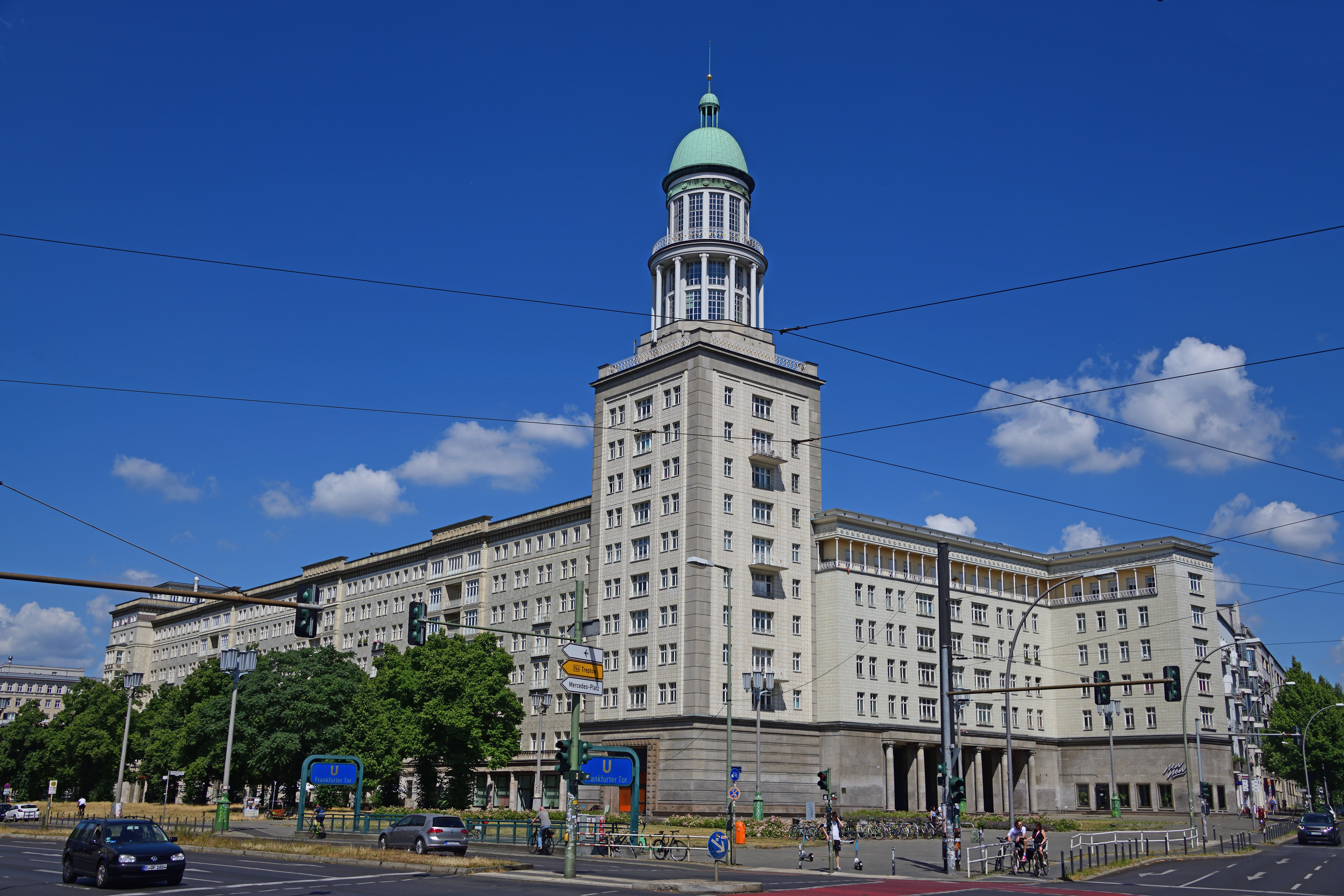
Berlin, Frankfurter Tor

After the Soviet victory, various grandiose war memorials were built in Berlin, including one in the Tiergarten and another, larger one in Treptow. The first major Stalinist building in Germany was the Soviet embassy in Unter den Linden. This was initially mocked by Modernists such as Hermann Henselmann, and until around 1948, East Berlin's city planning (directed by Hans Scharoun) was Modernist, as in the galleried apartments that comprise the first part of a planned Stalinallee. However, the government condemned these experiments and adopted the Russian style, and the rest of the Stalinallee was designed by Henselmann and former Modernists like Richard Paulick in what was disrespectfully dubbed Zuckerbäckerstil ("wedding cake style").

Due to its reputation as a baroque city, stalinist architecture in Dresden was mixed with elements of the Dresden Baroque. Similarly, the stalinist buildings in the port city of Rostock contain elements of Brick Gothic as a symbol of local identity.

Similar monuments were designed in other cities, such as Leipzig, Magdeburg, and the new town of Stalinstadt (founded 1950, renamed Eisenhüttenstadt in 1961, during de-Stalinization).

=== Romania, Bulgaria, Albania, Czech Republic, Slovakia, Hungary and Latvia ===
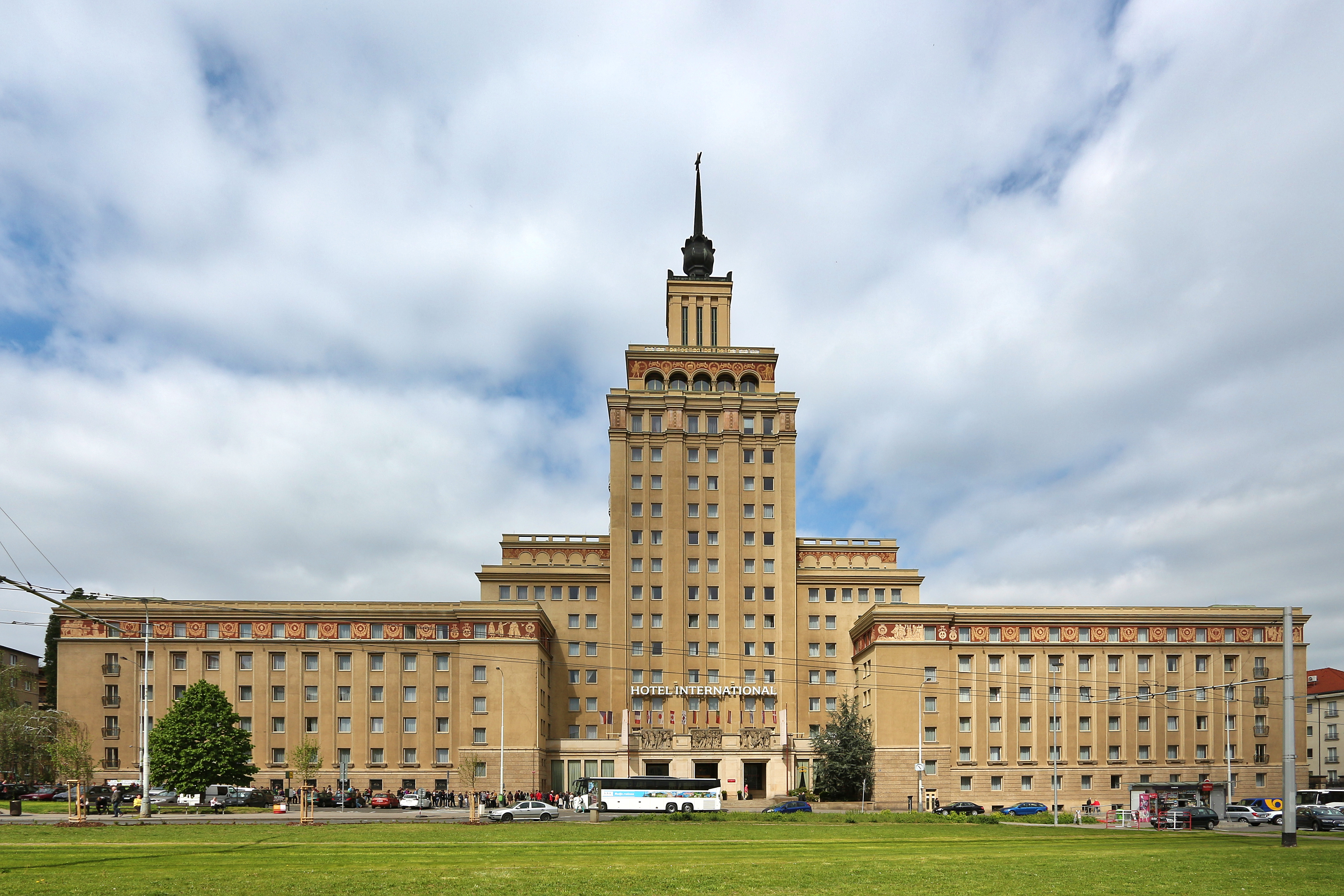
Grand Hotel International Prague in the Czech Republic

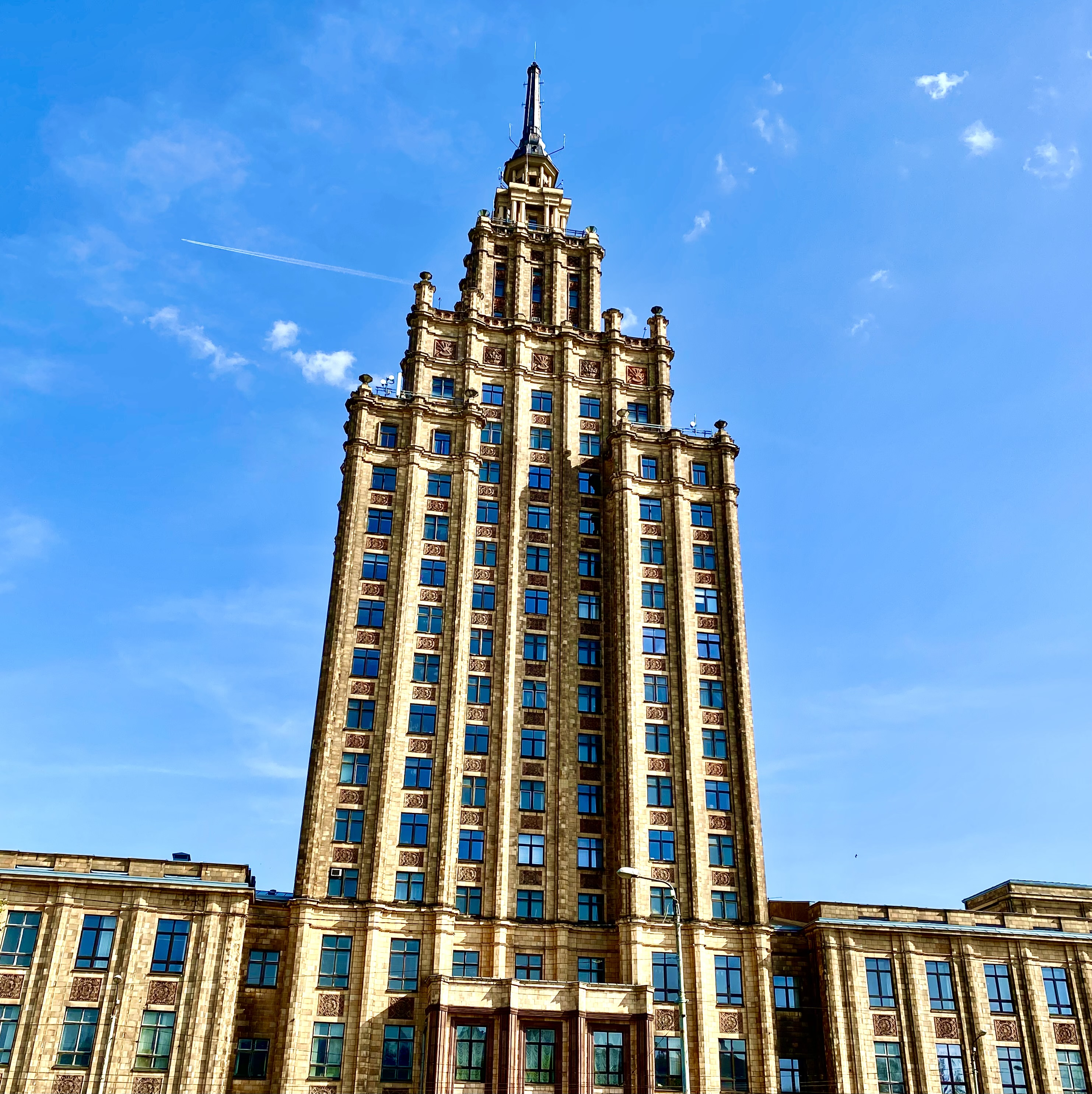
Latvian Academy of Sciences in Riga, Latvia

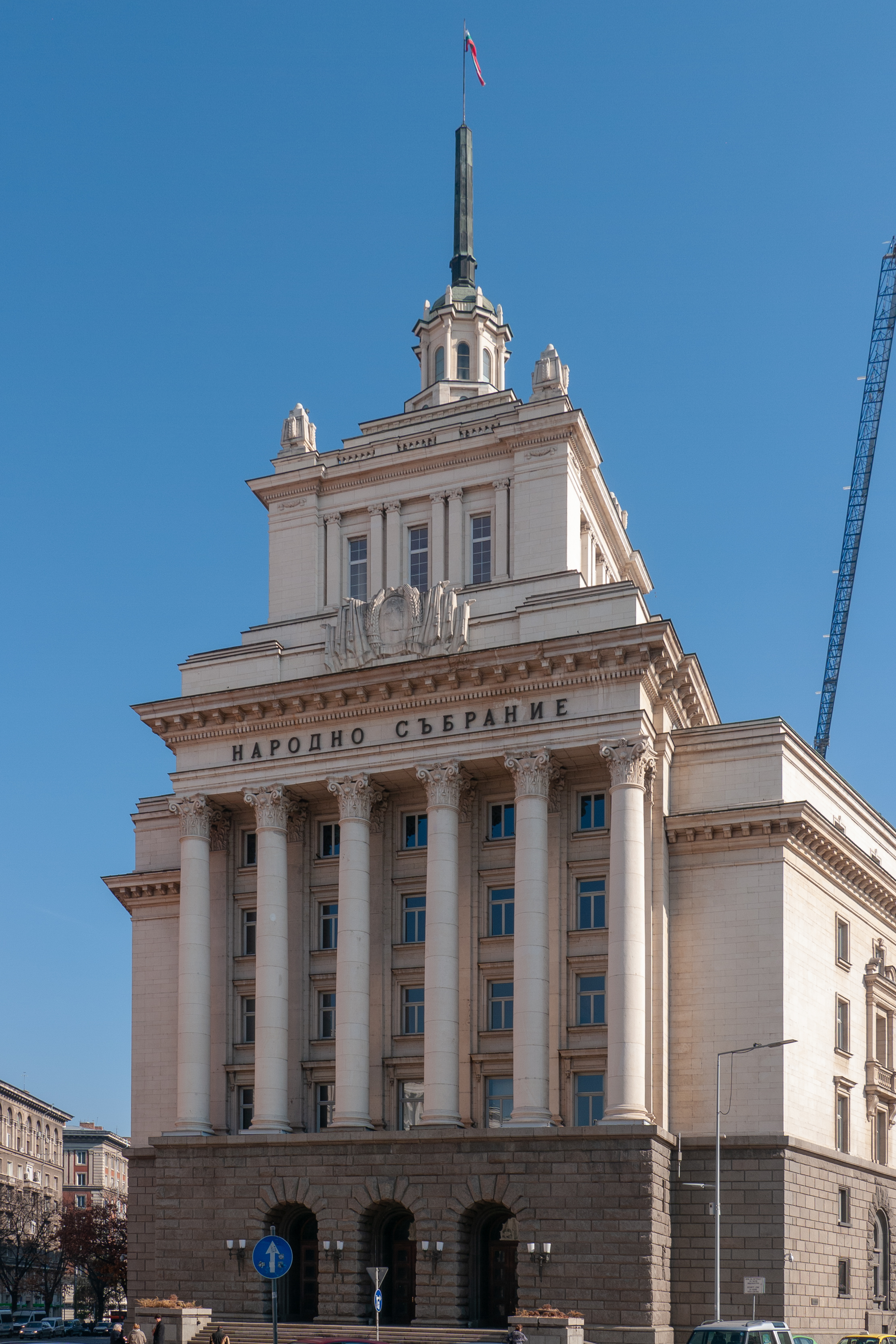
The former Party House in Sofia, Bulgaria

Stalinist skyscrapers similar to the Seven Sisters were built also in Bucharest in Romania (The Spark Building), Prague in the Czech Republic (Družba Hotel) and in Riga in Latvia (Latvian Academy of Sciences).

Other buildings built in the Stalinist manner also included the complex of the Largo, Sofia in Bulgaria. There were fewer examples in Slovakia. An example in Albania is the former New Albania Film Studio in Tirana. In Hungary a Stalinist style was adopted for the new town of Sztálinváros and many other housing, government and infrastructural projects during the 1950s.

As in the USSR, Modernism returned in much of Eastern Europe after the mid-1950s, although there were exceptions to this in the most hardline regimes: the enormous Palace of the Parliament in Bucharest is a very late example of neoclassicism, begun as late as 1984 and completed in 1997, soon after the end of Nicolae Ceaușescu's regime in 1989.

=== Other areas ===
In East Asia, some examples may be found in North Korea and China like the Beijing Exhibition Center, the Shanghai Exhibition Centre, originally built as the Palace of Sino-Soviet Friendship, and the Moscow Restaurant in Beijing. Examples may also be found in Ulanbaatar, Mongolia. Stalinist styles were used for the design of Soviet embassies outside of the Eastern Bloc, notably the embassy (1952) in Helsinki, Finland. The building, designed by architect E.S.Grebenshthikov, has a certain resemblance to Buckingham Palace in London; this is said to be due to the then Soviet foreign minister Vyacheslav Molotov's liking for the official residence of the British monarch.

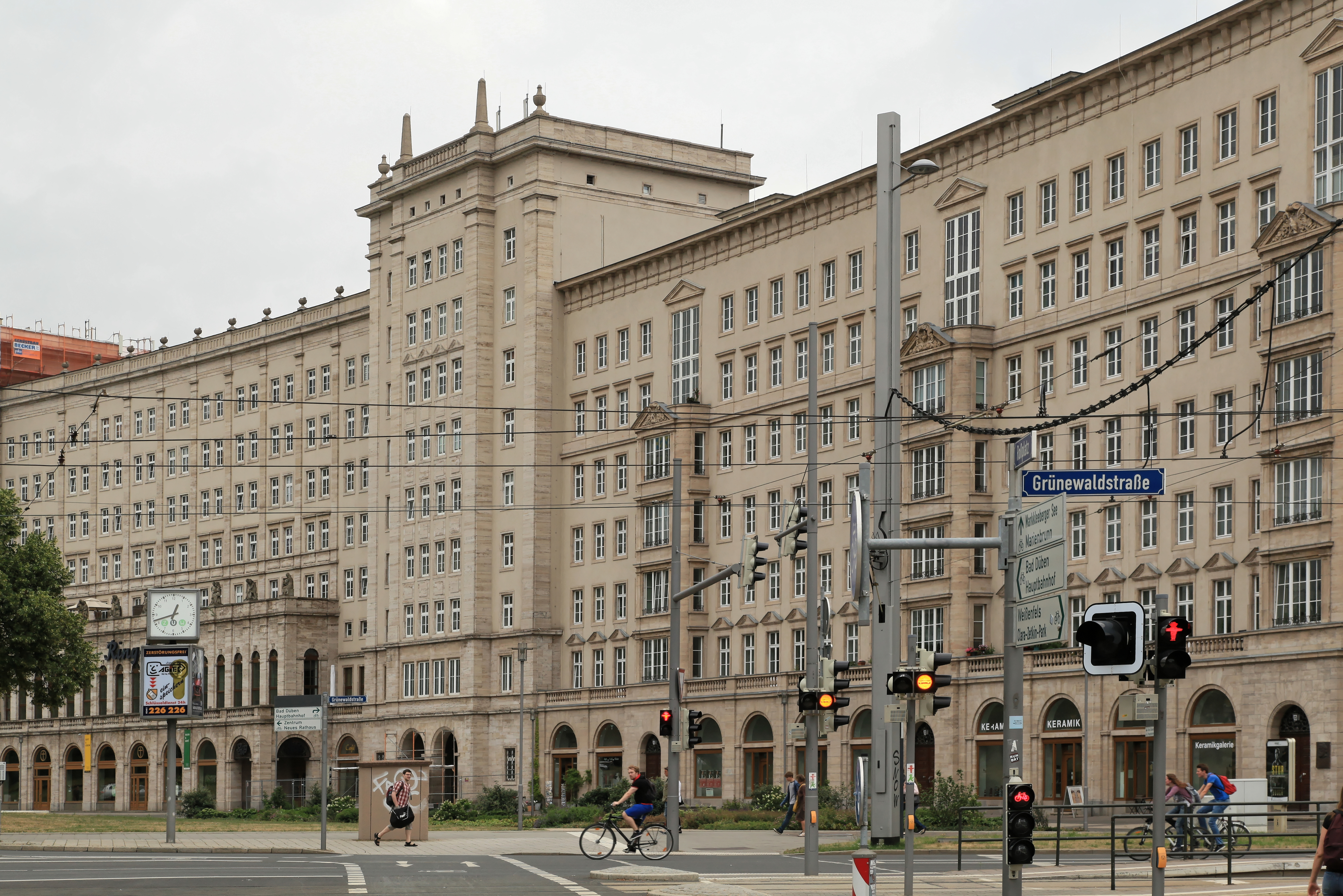
Leipzig, Roßplatz

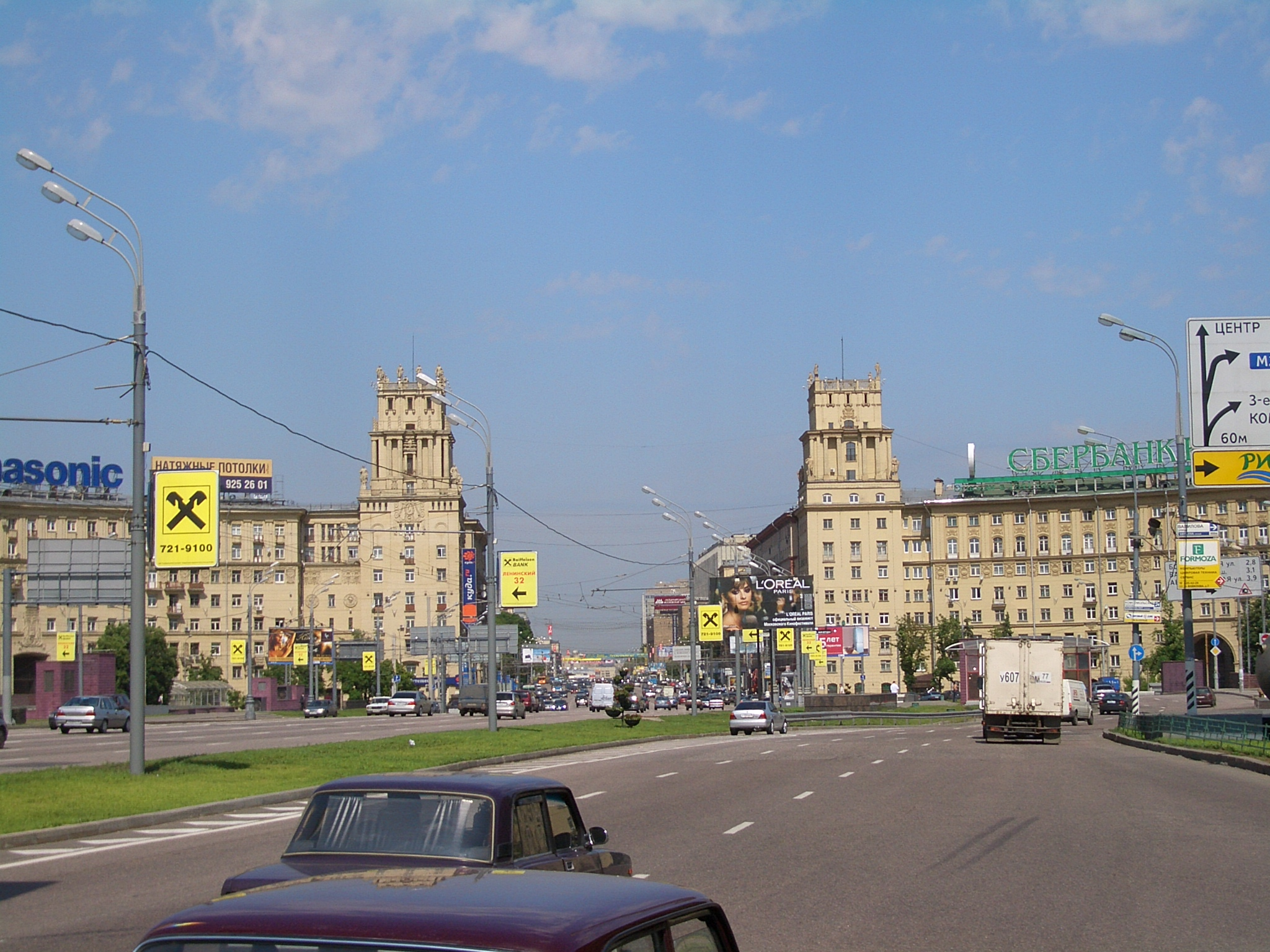
Moscow, Gagarin square; note different finishes

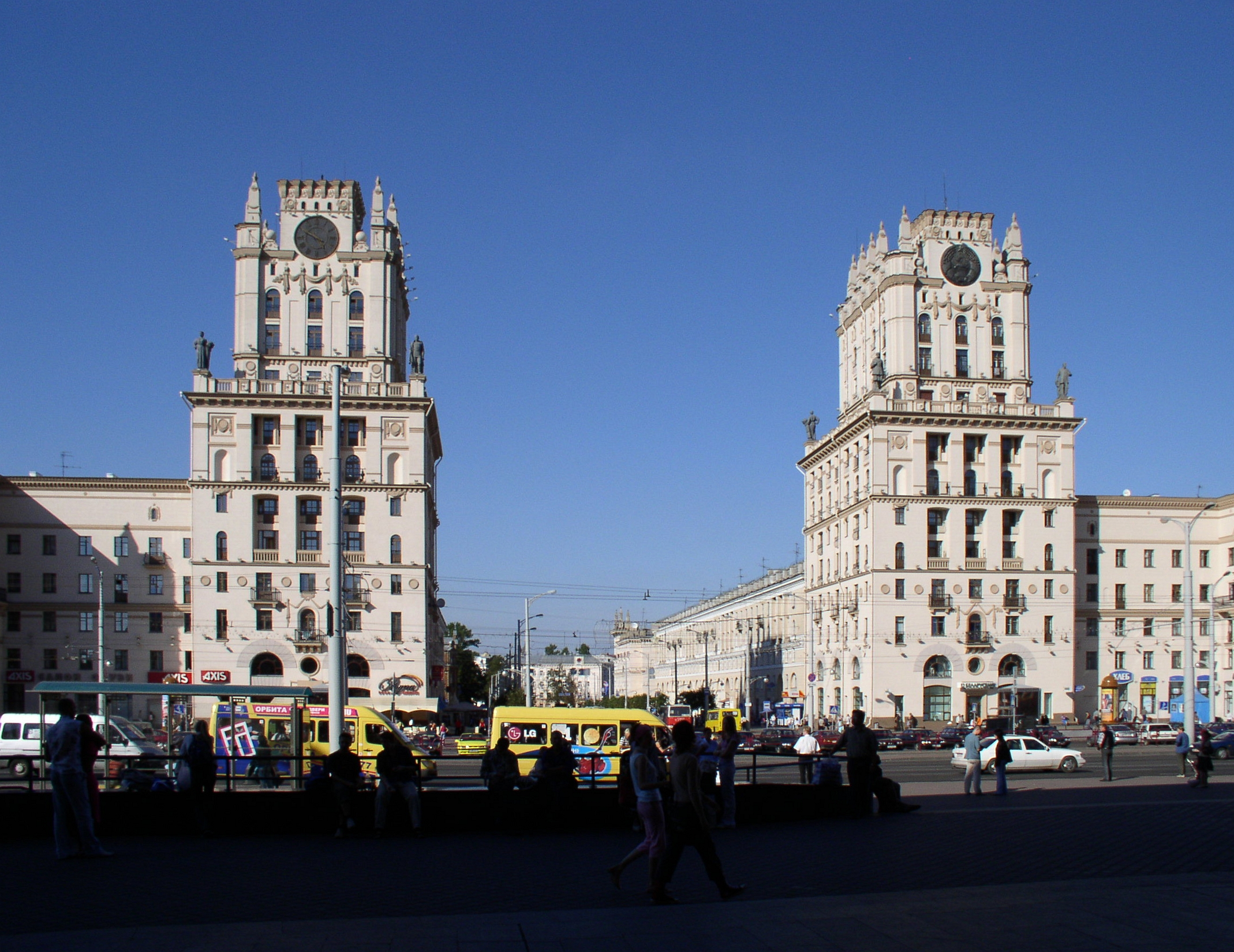
Minsk, Railway Terminal square

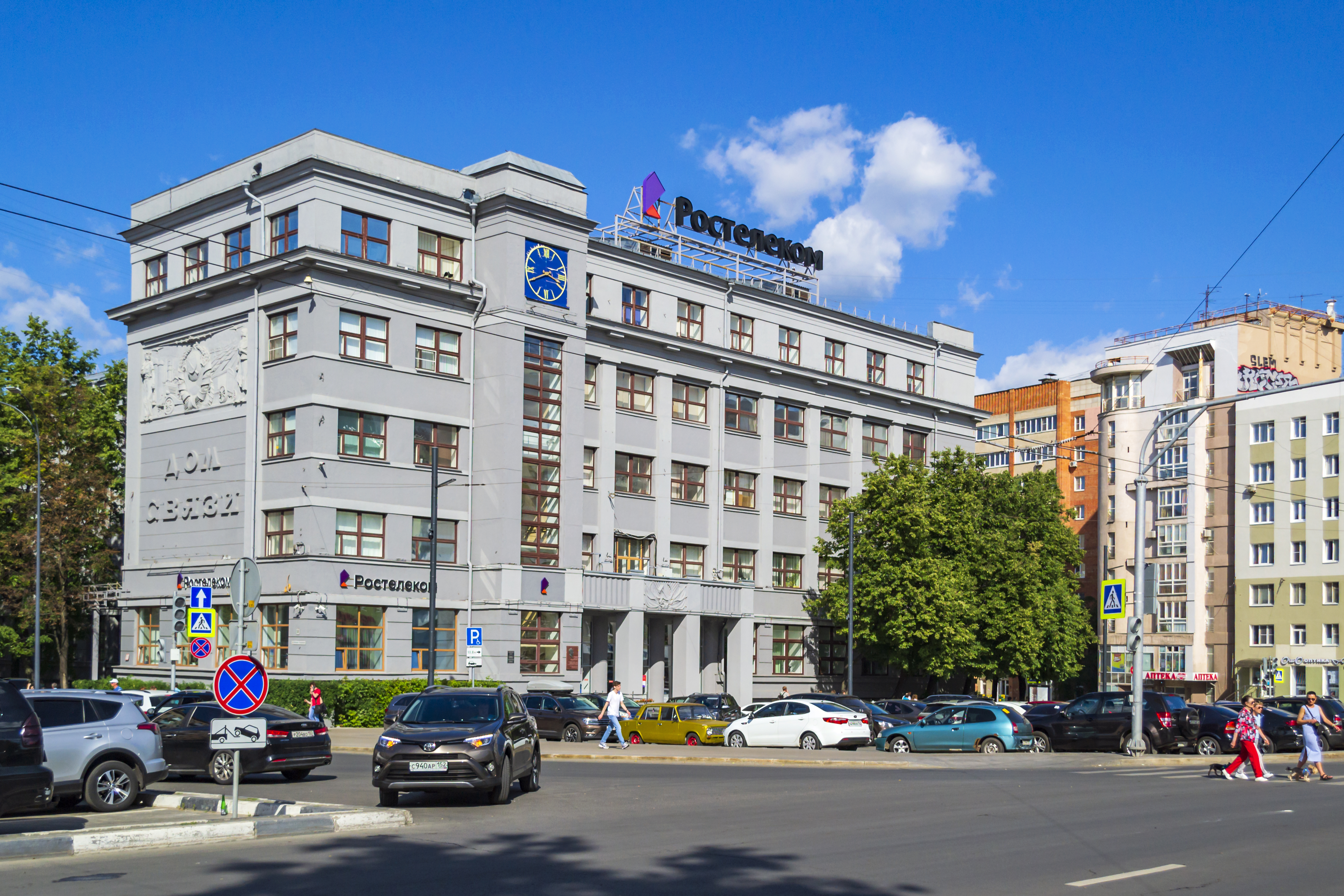
The Main post office, Nizhny Novgorod

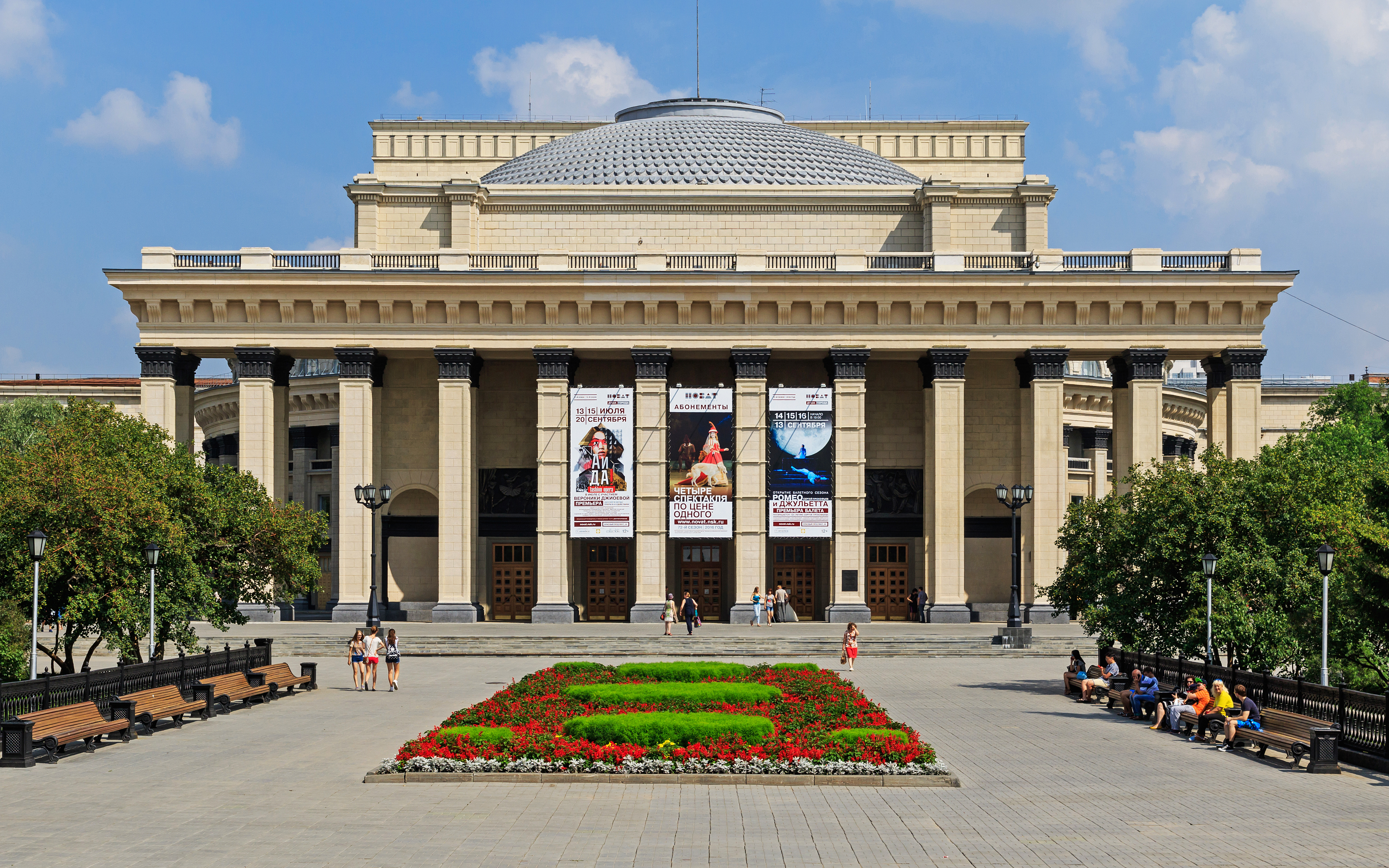
Novosibirsk Opera and Ballet Theatre

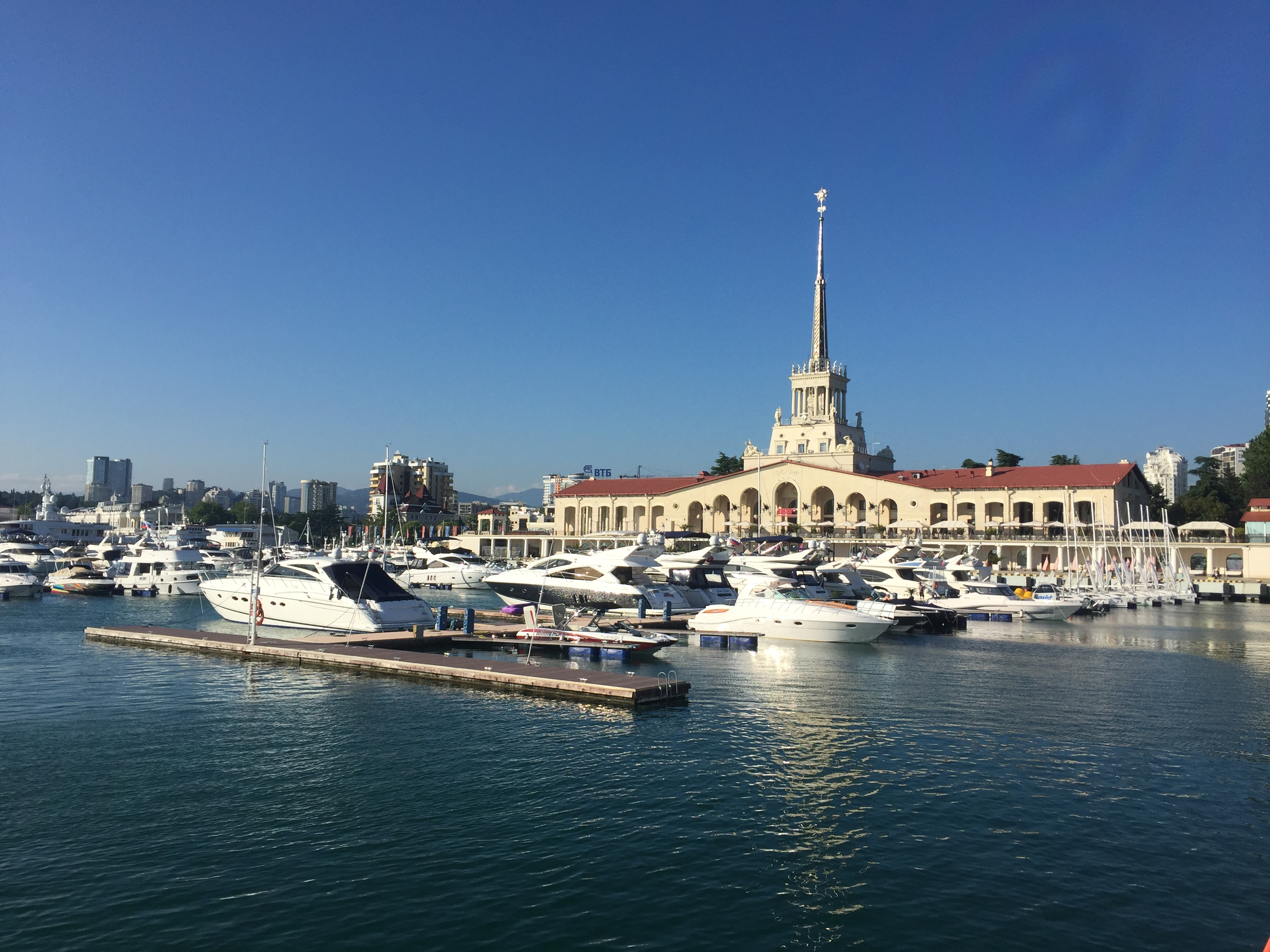
The Port of Sochi terminal building

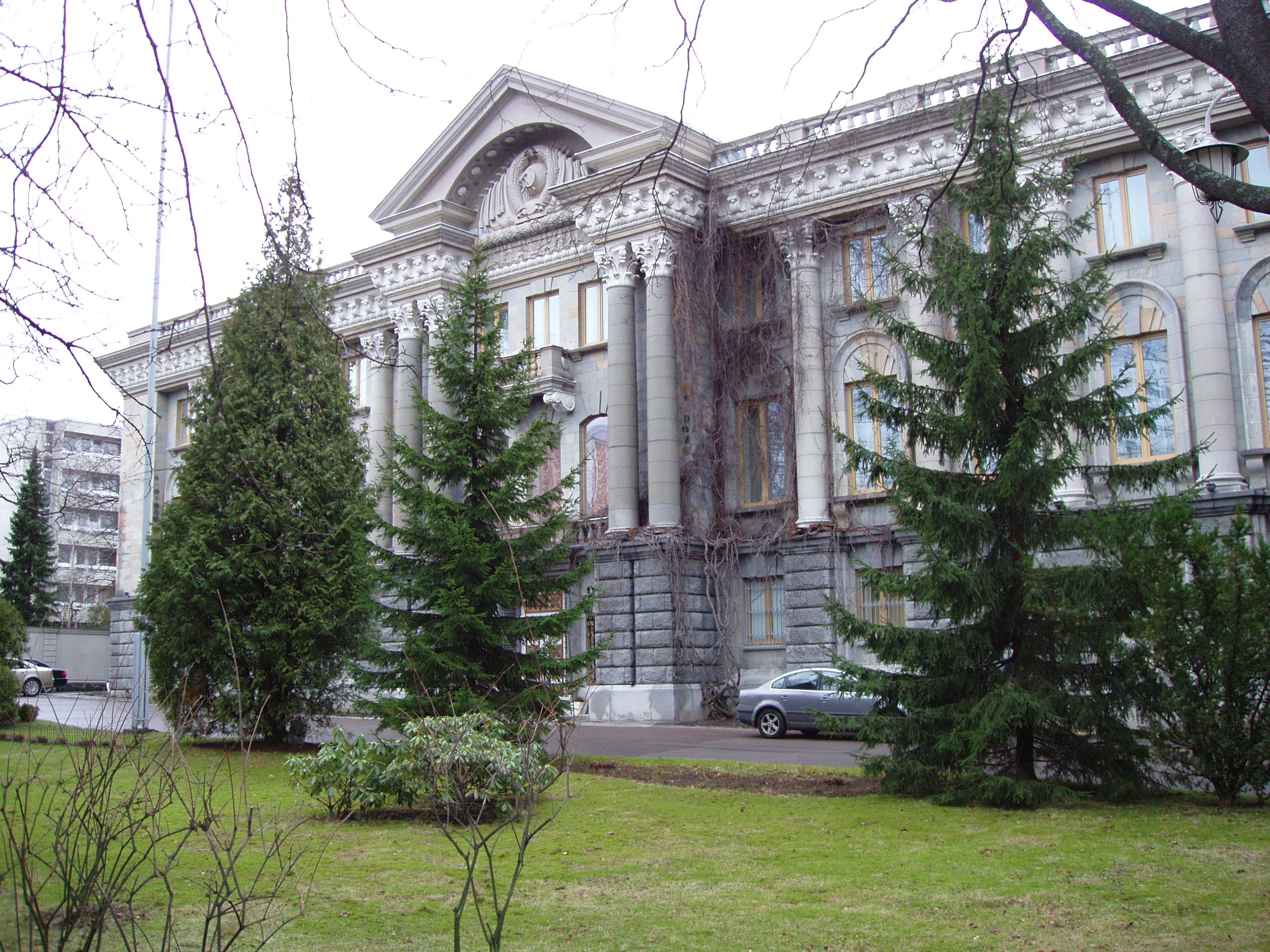
The Russian embassy in Helsinki

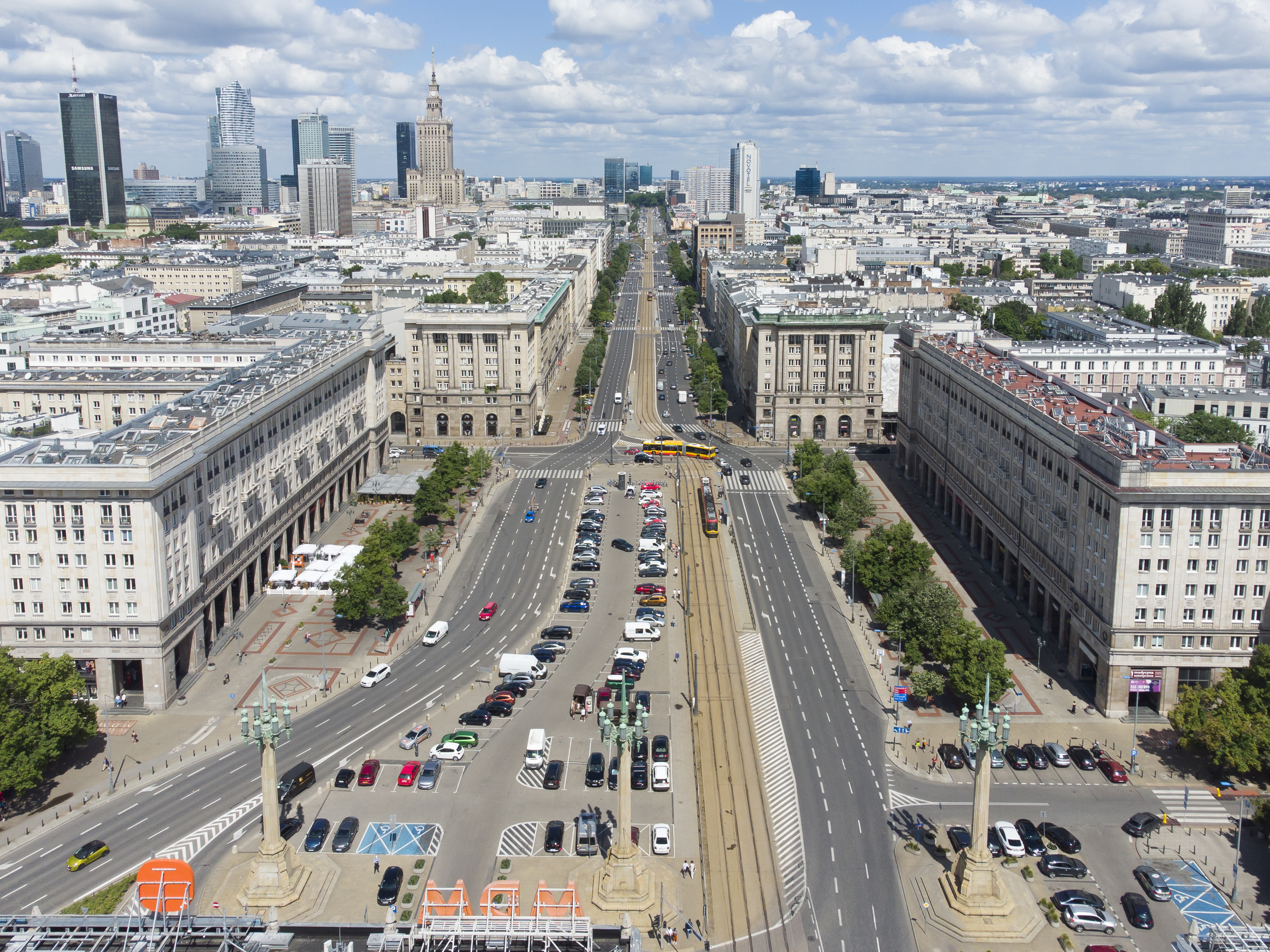
Plac Konstytucji - part of the MDM in Warsaw

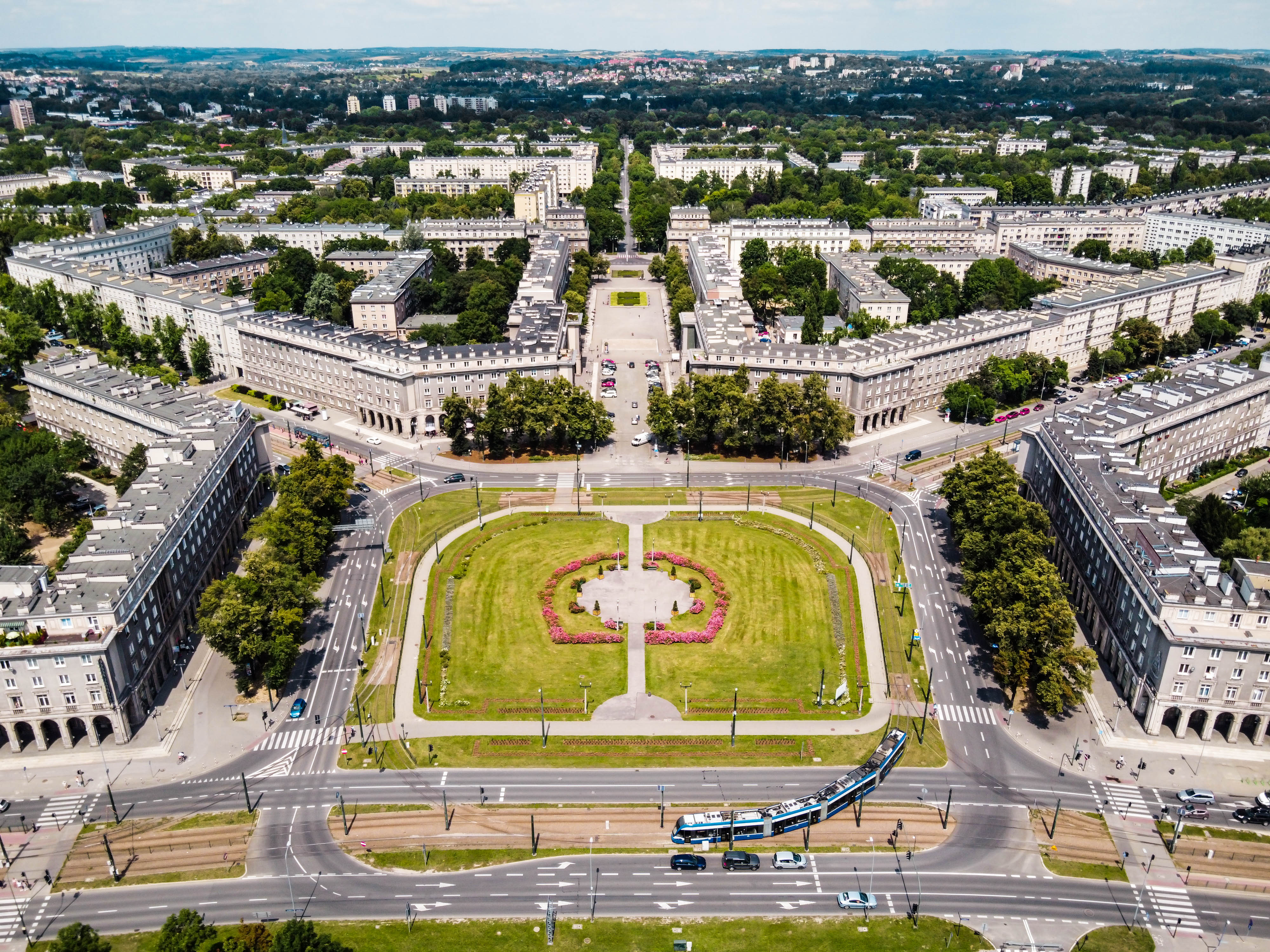
Nowa Huta in Kraków

== Legacy and revival ==
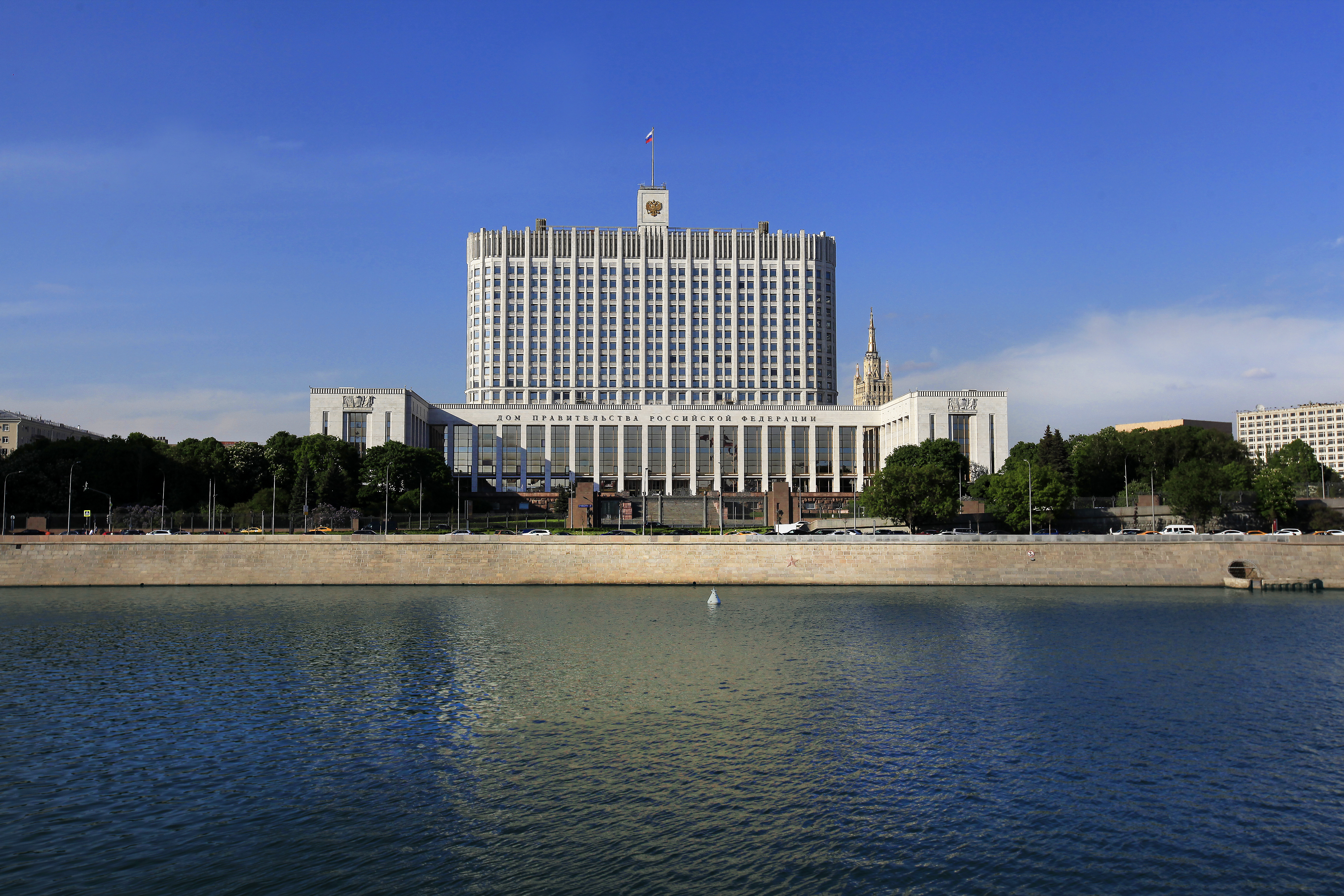
The White House of Russia

Certain buildings of the Brezhnev era, notably the "White House of Russia", can be traced to Stalin's legacy, while the Neo-Stalinist regime of Ceaușescu's Romania produced a vast, late example of the style in its Palace of the Parliament, which was started in 1984. Deliberate recreations of his style have appeared in Moscow since 1996, either as infill into period neighborhoods, or as individual developments. Some are influenced by pure Neoclassicism or Art Deco; with a few exceptions, their architectural quality and function in urban development is disputed. Examples of the least controversial kind are:

- Triumph Palace in Moscow is one of the most prominent buildings, with a silhouette identical to the Stalinist constructions.
- Roman Court (Римский Двор, 2005) by Mikhail Filippov; probably better classified as neoclassical, yet related to early Stalinist buildings.
- GALS Tower (Cистема ГАЛС, 2001) by a team of Workshop 14 architects fills a gap between midrise period buildings on Tverskaya. Not intended to dominate the neighborhood, it just marks the corner of a block. Despite mixed citations from Art Nouveau and Art Deco, it blends well with its Tverskaya setting.
- Preobrazhenskaya Zastava (Преображенская Застава, 2003) is a whole block (308 apartments and retail stores) designed during the early 1930s with a style similar to the Art Deco adaptations by of Iofan and Vladimirov. An unusual example which actually looks like a period piece, not a modern replica.

=== Legacy in China ===
China's urban planning was heavily influenced by the Soviet Union during the period of the First Five Year Plan (1953–1957). In the early part of the 1950s, city plans also followed the socialist city planning principles from the 1935 Moscow Master Plan.

== See also ==
- Constructivist architecture
- List of Russian architects
- Socialist realism
- Wedding-cake style
