= Ministry of Construction of Heavy Industry =

Government ministry of the Soviet Union

Coordinates: 55°46′10″N 37°38′58″E

The Ministry of Construction of Heavy Industry of the USSR (Mintyazhstroy; Russian: Министерство строительства предприятий тяжелой промышленности СССР) was a central government institution charged with leading the heavy industry of the Soviet Union. It was established in 1946 to replace the several successor Commissariats to the People's Commissariat of Heavy Industry of the USSR, dissolved in 1939. After liquidation in 1953, it was reactivated from 1967 to 1986.

The ministry headquarters was one of the Seven Sisters built during the last 10 years of Stalin's life, also known as the Red Gate building owing to its proximity to the Red Gate Square.

== List of ministers ==
- Pavel Yudin (16.1.1946 - 29.5.1950)
- Davyd Raizer (29.5.1950 - 15.3.1953)
- Nikolai Goldin (21.2.1967 - 30.1.1986)
- Sergei Bashilov (30.1.1986 - 2.9.1986)
