= Red Gate =

Set of triumphal arches in Moscow, Russia

Coordinates: 55°46′6″N 37°38′59″E

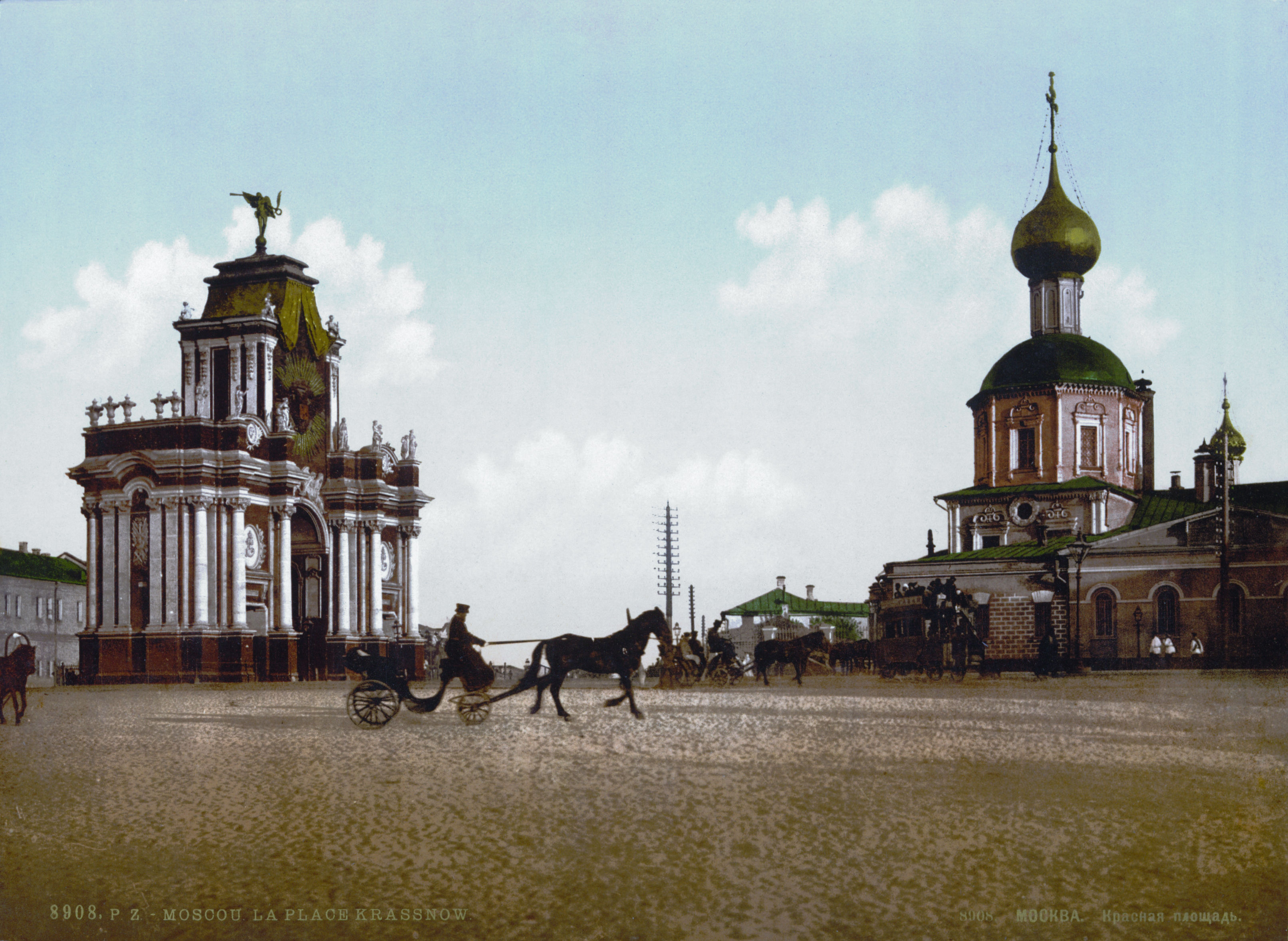
Red Gates in Moscow (from a 19th-century postcard)

The Red Gate (Russian: Красные ворота, Krasnye vorota) was a set of triumphal arches built in an exuberantly baroque design in Moscow. Gates and arches of this type were common in 18th century Moscow. However, the Red Gate was the only one that survived until the 20th century. It was demolished in 1927, but the name still survives in an eponymous Moscow Metro station.

== Background ==
=== National roots ===
The Russian tradition of triumphal arches (or gates, as they were called during 18th-19th centuries) goes back to the time of Peter I. However, their specific Muscovite shape is a direct consequence of the Time of Troubles of the early 17th century, when civil war, foreign raiders, and rampant crime forced landlords to fortify their town and country estates. In their simplest form, gates were cut through wooden palisade walls, and fortified with a small defensive platform perched above them. If money allowed, gates were fortified with a barbican tower, again with a raised wooden platform.

In the 18th century, this platform was transformed into a raised structure above the main arch. Thus, early Russian triumphal arches have a triangular, tripartite composition (two side pylons and a center piece, square or octagonal, raised above them). Contemporary 18th-century engravings present different variations of the type (notably, Alexey Zubov's 1711 engraving showing troops marching through seven different gates). It is believed that these gates influenced traditional Muscovite architects in favor of the Petrine Baroque style, inspiring masterpieces like the Church of St. John the Warrior.

An extant example of private estate gates following the same layout belongs to the former Golitsyn estate on Volkhonka street (adjacent to the Pushkin Museum, see the photo).

=== Petrine tradition ===
The first true triumphal gates in Russia were installed by Peter I of Russia, intended for his generals' and his own triumphant rides. The earliest are dated 1697 (Capture of Azov) and 1703 (for the early victories of Boris Sheremetev, Anikita Repnin and Jacob Bruce in Great Northern War). Three sets of gates were set in

- Kitai-gorod near Zaikonospassky monastery
- Ilyinka Gates of Bely Gorod
- Myasnitskaya Gates of Bely Gorod

The second round of triumphal construction, commemorating the Battle of Poltava in 1709, resulted in seven gates being built in Moscow, notably the barbican gate on Bolshoy Kamenny Bridge. The third occasion, the Battle of Gangut of 1714, was celebrated in Saint Petersburg only. Finally, the Treaty of Nystadt was celebrated in both Saint Petersburg and Moscow. Peter's successors (Anna I of Russia, Elizabeth of Russia, Catherine II of Russia) had built various gates, but Red Gate in Moscow were the only ones that survived to 20th century.

== History of Red Gate ==
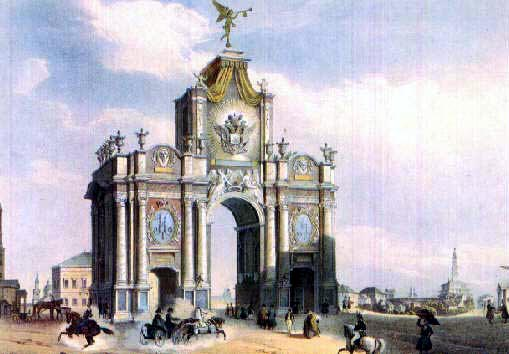
Red Gate in the 1840s

The original arch on the site of Red Gate was built to commemorate the Battle of Poltava in 1709. Catherine I replaced it with a new structure in order to commemorate her own coronation in 1724. This arch burnt down 8 years later and was restored in 1742, for Elizabeth's coronation procession, which proceeded from the Moscow Kremlin to the Lefortovo Palace through the edifice.

In 1753, the wooden arch was demolished and replaced with a stone one. The design by Prince Dmitry Ukhtomsky faithfully followed that of Catherine I's architects. This was a refined specimen of baroque sensibility, with red-blood walls, snow-white reliefs, golden capitals, and 15 bright paintings representing "Tsardoms of the Russian Empire", coats of arms of Russian provinces, etc. A large portrait of Empress Elizabeth, surrounded by a lambent halo, was replaced with a double-headed eagle for Nicholas I's coronation in 1825. The structure was crowned by a golden statue of trumpeting angel. Around the gate, a spacious square was laid out.

== Demolition ==
The Red Gate was renovated in the spring of 1926. However, in December 1926, Mossovet approved demolition of the gate and other buildings, to make way for the Garden Ring expansion. The Red Gate was demolished June 3, 1927, despite protests from Ivan Fomin, Petr Baranovsky, and other artists. A statue of an angel and other artifacts were preserved at the Museum of Moscow.

The square was still known as Krasnye Vorota (Red Gate), and in 1935 acquired a Metro station of the same name, designed by Ivan Fomin (underground station) and Nikolai Ladovsky (surface vestibule). In 1953, one of Stalin's skyscrapers, the Red Gate Building, was erected on the square to a design by Alexey Dushkin.

The square and station were renamed Lermontovskaya after Mikhail Lermontov in 1962 and were renamed back to Krasniye Vorota in 1986. Proposals to rebuild the arch were rejected, citing traffic congestion and the disparity between the modest size of the arch compared to the present-day width of the Garden Ring. The Angel of Glory, painted black, commemorates the loss of the Red Gate on the official coat of arms of Krasnoselsky District of Moscow.
