= Garden Ring =

Circular ring road avenue around central Moscow

Coordinates: 55°46′25″N 37°37′18″E

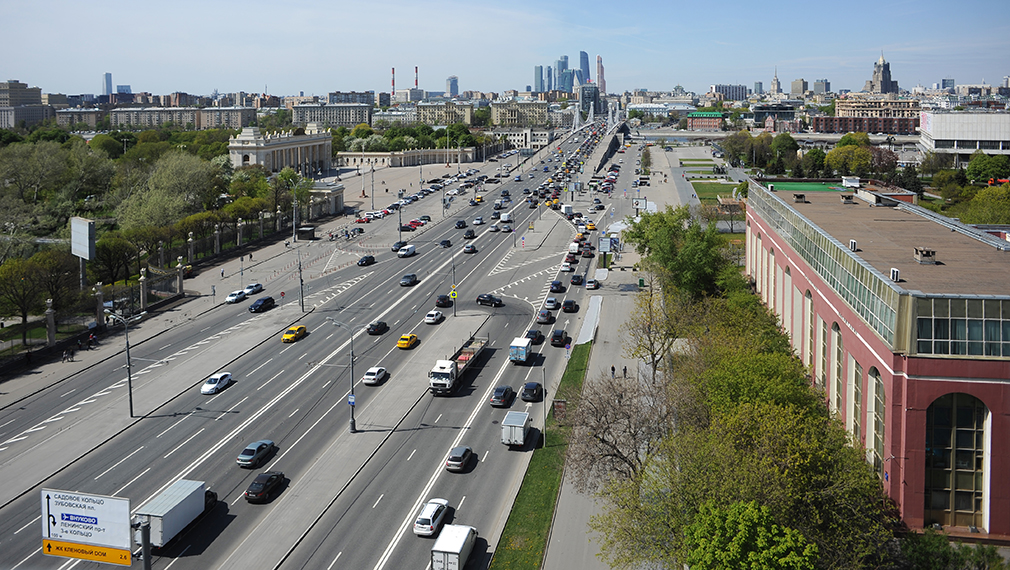
The Garden Ring in the area of Krimsky Val Street

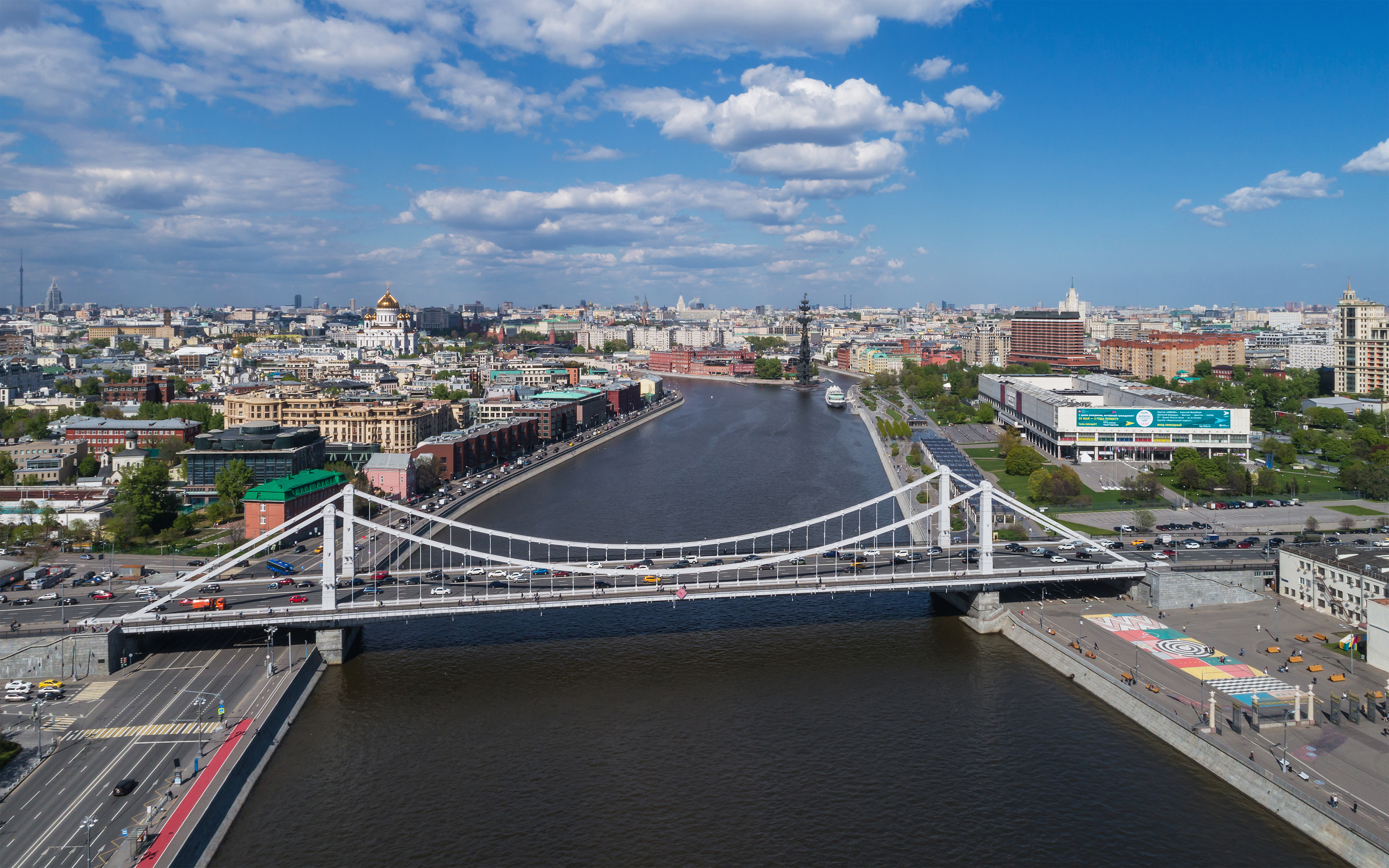
Krymsky (Crimean) Bridge, with six lanes, is one of the narrowest stretches of the Garden Ring

The Garden Ring (Russian: Садовое кольцо, romanized: Sadovoye koltso), also known as the "B" Ring (Russian: кольцо "Б"), is a circular ring road and avenue around central Moscow, with its course corresponding to what used to be the city ramparts surrounding Zemlyanoy Gorod in the 17th century.

The Ring consists of seventeen individually named streets (Note: Two of these streets, Korovy Val and Zhitnaya Street, are parallel frontage roads that run along the same stretch of the Ring in a tunnel.) and fifteen squares. It has a circumference of 16 kilometers (9.9 mi). At its narrowest point, Krymsky Bridge, the Ring has six lanes. After reconstruction is completed, no section of the Ring will have more than ten lanes. In 2018, more than 50% of sections of the Garden Ring had been reconstructed, including Zubovskaya Square, which was the widest section, with about 18 lanes before reconstruction. The Ring emerged in the 1820s, replacing fortifications in the form of ramparts that were no longer of military value.

== History ==
=== Skorodom ===
The Garden Ring is a direct descendant of the Skorodom (Russian: Скородом, lit. 'Quick Building') and Earth Rampart (Russian: Земляной Вал, romanized: Zemlyanoy Val) fortifications, respectively. Said fortifications were erected during the reign of Feodor I of Russia after a disastrous raid by Ğazı II Giray (1591). Although Boris Godunov, then the de facto regent of Russia, was able to prevent Crimean Tatars from taking the city north of Moskva River, he anticipated future raids and arranged construction of another ring of defenses.

=== Zemlyanoy Val ===
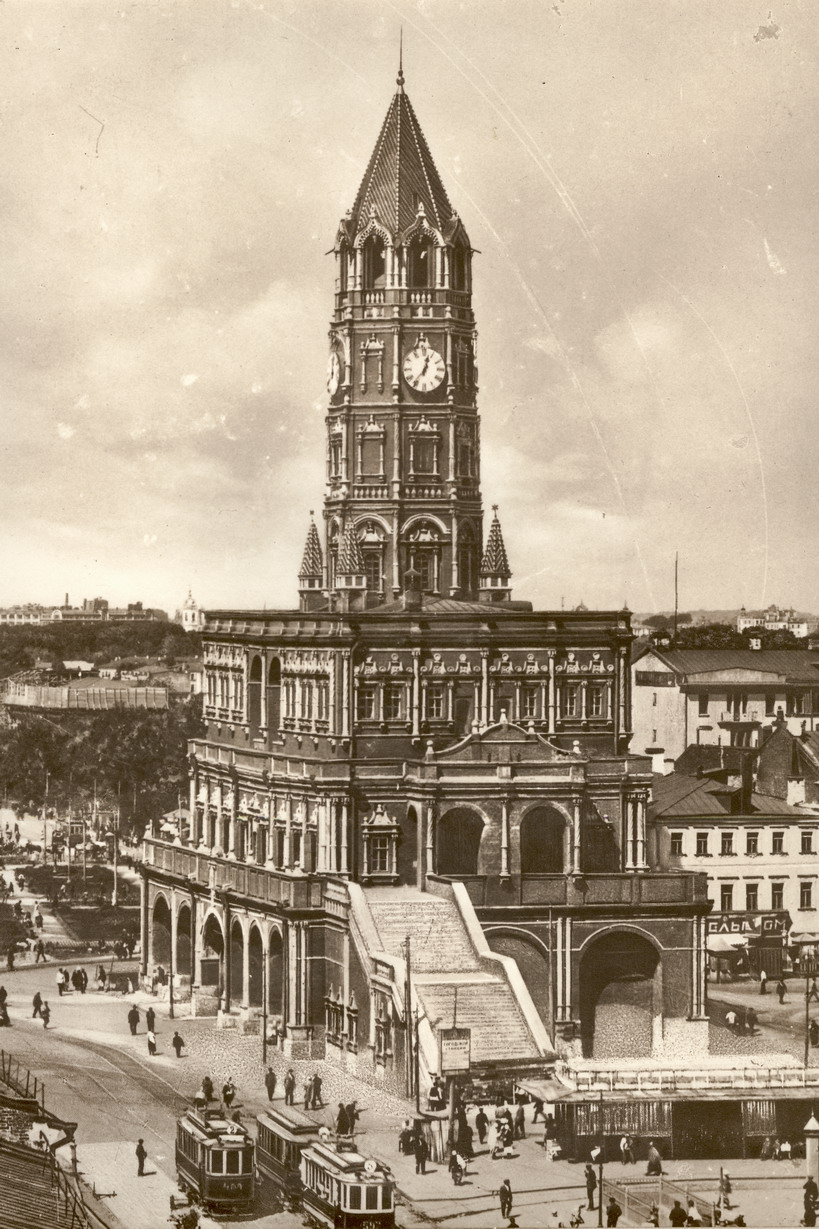
Sukharev Tower, built on the Rampart in the 1690s

When the Time of Troubles ended, instead of rebuilding the Skorodom, the government of Mikhail Romanov replaced it with a new, taller rampart known as Zemlyanoy Val (Russian: Земляной Вал, lit. 'Earth Rampart'), completed in 1630–1638. Its name survives in present-day Zemlyanoy Val Street (former Chkalov Street) in the south-eastern segment of Garden Ring.

Instead of towers, the Rampart had 34 gates for passage. As a defense measure, slobodas of the streltsy were located next to these gates, especially in southern Yakimanka and Zamoskvorechye Districts. While effective against Tatar raiders, the streltsy were politically destabilizing. After the streltsy uprising of 1698, Peter I arranged mass executions of the streltsy on the Earth Rampart, hanging 36 soldiers at each of Zamoskoverchye gates and 56 at Taganka gates; the remainder of the streltsy were disbanded by the end of Peter's reign. From 1683 to 1718, the Rampart served as the Moscow customs border; traders, evading taxation, set numerous markets right outside of city gates; the last of these, Zatsepa Market, was closed in the 1970s. Eventually, Peter I lifted this taxation in 1722, but it resumed in the 1730s at the new city border, Kamer-Kollezhsky Val.

The rampart lost its military value in the 18th century; in fact, many segments of the rampart were built out with private and state properties, including the triumphal Red Gates and a similar triumphal arch in Triumfalnaya Square (continuously rebuilt in 1721, 1731, 1742, 1762 and 1775). In 1775, the local authorities entertained the idea of restoring the rampart but were set back by the number of state institutions that had to be demolished. The 1812 fire destroyed these properties, so nothing stood in the way of city development plans.

=== 19th century ===
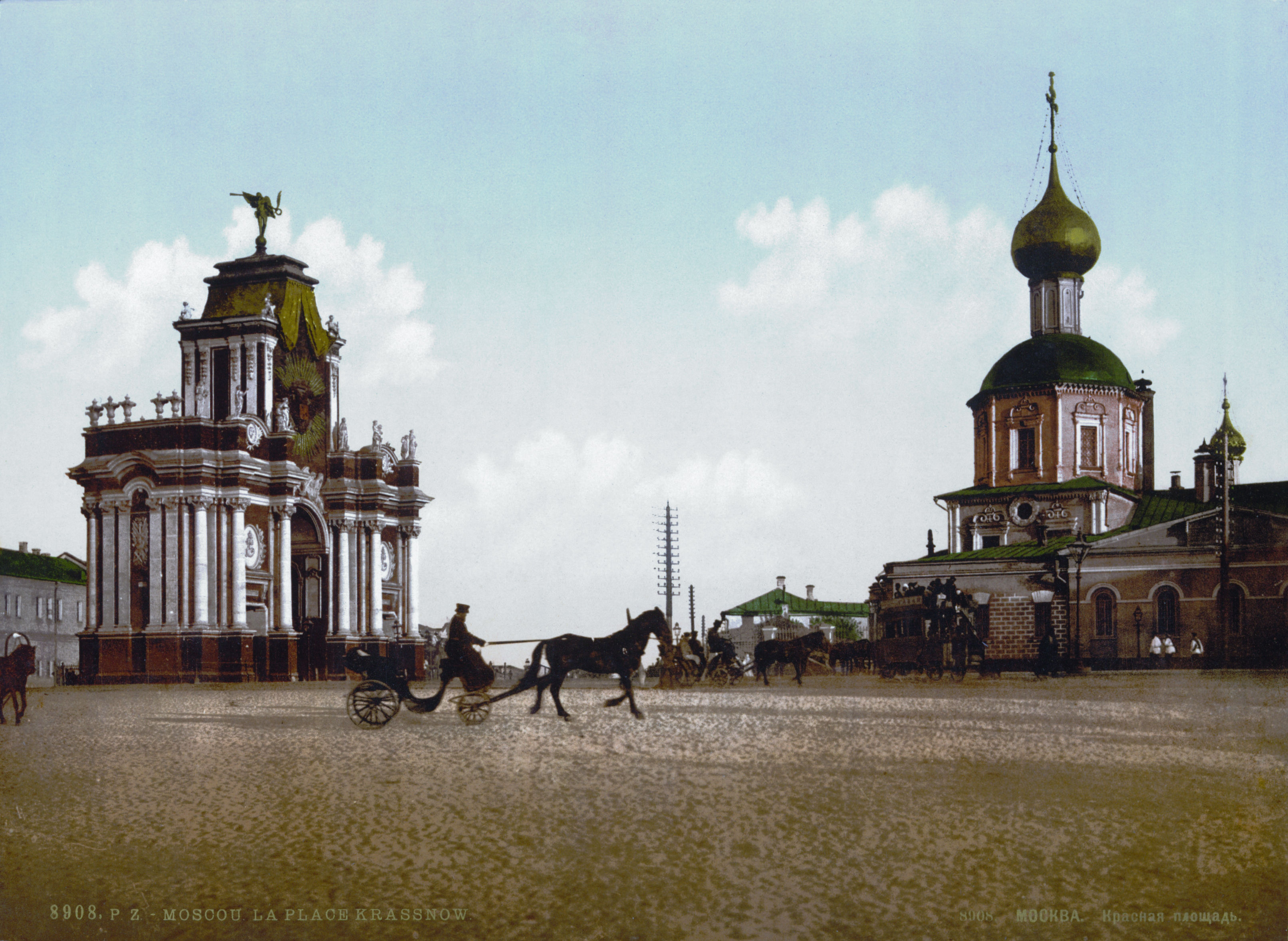
Red Gates in Moscow (from a 19th-century postcard)

Instead of rebuilding the now useless rampart, according to census records, the city leveled it sometime between 1818 and 1826. The new free land was developed according to local social status: the upper-class western segment of the Garden Ring acquired central boulevards, flanked by side streets. Present-day streets in this segments are still called boulevards (such as Zubovsky Boulevard). Elsewhere, the Garden Ring was set as a 10–20 sazhen (22–43 meters) wide street; unused side territories were allocated to existing homeowners on condition that they plant and maintain gardens at their own expense. These streets usually have a name beginning with "Sadovaya", such as Sadovo–Triumphalnaya Street. By 1850, all buildings in this street were completely hidden from view by foliage; the street, indeed, was running through a garden. In the south-eastern segment (Tagansky District), the Garden Ring was not as wide, thus the name of Zemlyanoy Val remained. THe largest square, which is a combination of two market squares, was created at the Red Gates in the north-eastern segment.

From the 1830s to 1862, Novinsky Boulevard became a popular amusement park with cheap theaters and carousels. In 1841, local entrepreneurs set up a short railroad with a real Mercury tank engine as a pleasure ride for the party crowds.

Rails for horsecars (konki) were installed in Moscow from 1872; however, the first lines were built on radial streets; rail construction in the Garden Ring peaked in 1891. Likewise, the first electrical tram was launched in 1899, but the Garden Ring was electrified in 1907–1910. The circular line traversing the Garden Ring was known as the "B" route, or a "bug" (букашка) in popular language. Gradually, new rental housing of four, five, and six-storey buildings replaced the old two-storey blocks; Moscow's tallest "skyscraper", an eight-storey Art Nouveau Afremov Building, was inaugurated in Sadovaya-Spasskaya Street in 1904.

=== Modern history ===
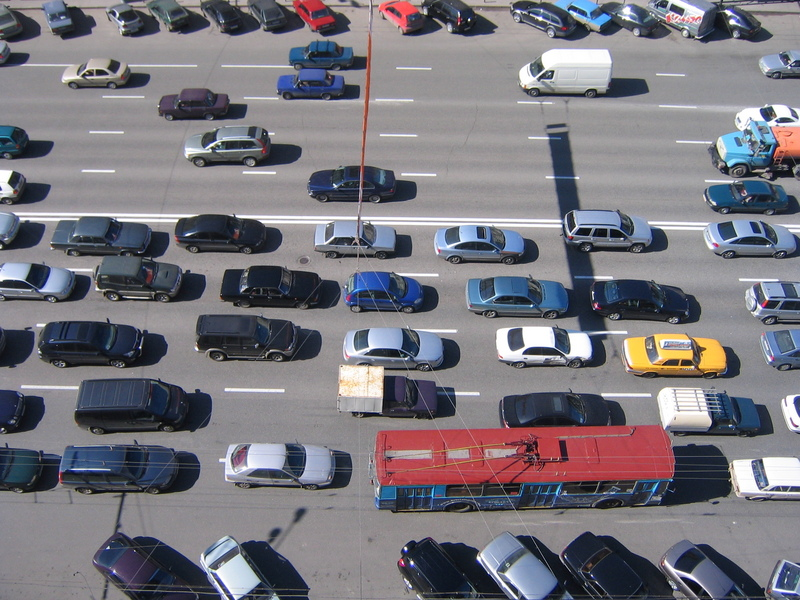
Close to Kursky railway station the Garden Ring has ten lanes of traffic

In 1935, Joseph Stalin's master plan of Moscow provided for the expansion of the Garden Ring to at least a 30–40 meter width and demolition of buildings set at the ends of the Garden Ring's boulevards to create wide open squares. Large Stalinist buildings, envisioned on all the Garden Ring, were initially planned only for major squares like Kursky Station Square and Triumfalnaya Square. However, one end-of-boulevard block survives, precisely on Triumfalnaya Square, atop the six-lane tunnel. The same plan required removal of tram tracks in line with the construction of the Moscow Metro. In fact, the removal of tram tracks proceeded well in advance of subway construction; by 1938, trams remained only in the southern and south-eastern segments of the Garden Ring (this segment was closed in 1961).

Stalinist construction continued after World War II, notably three skyscrapers: the Ministry of Foreign Affairs of Russia headquarters, the Kudrinskaya Square Building, and the Red Gate Building. However, no part of the Garden Ring was completely rebuilt in the Stalinist style or any other style. Any street of the Garden Ring is a mixture of different styles and sizes, from single-storey mansions of the 1820s to recently built shopping malls and the 162-meter Swissotel in Red Hills.

== Composition ==
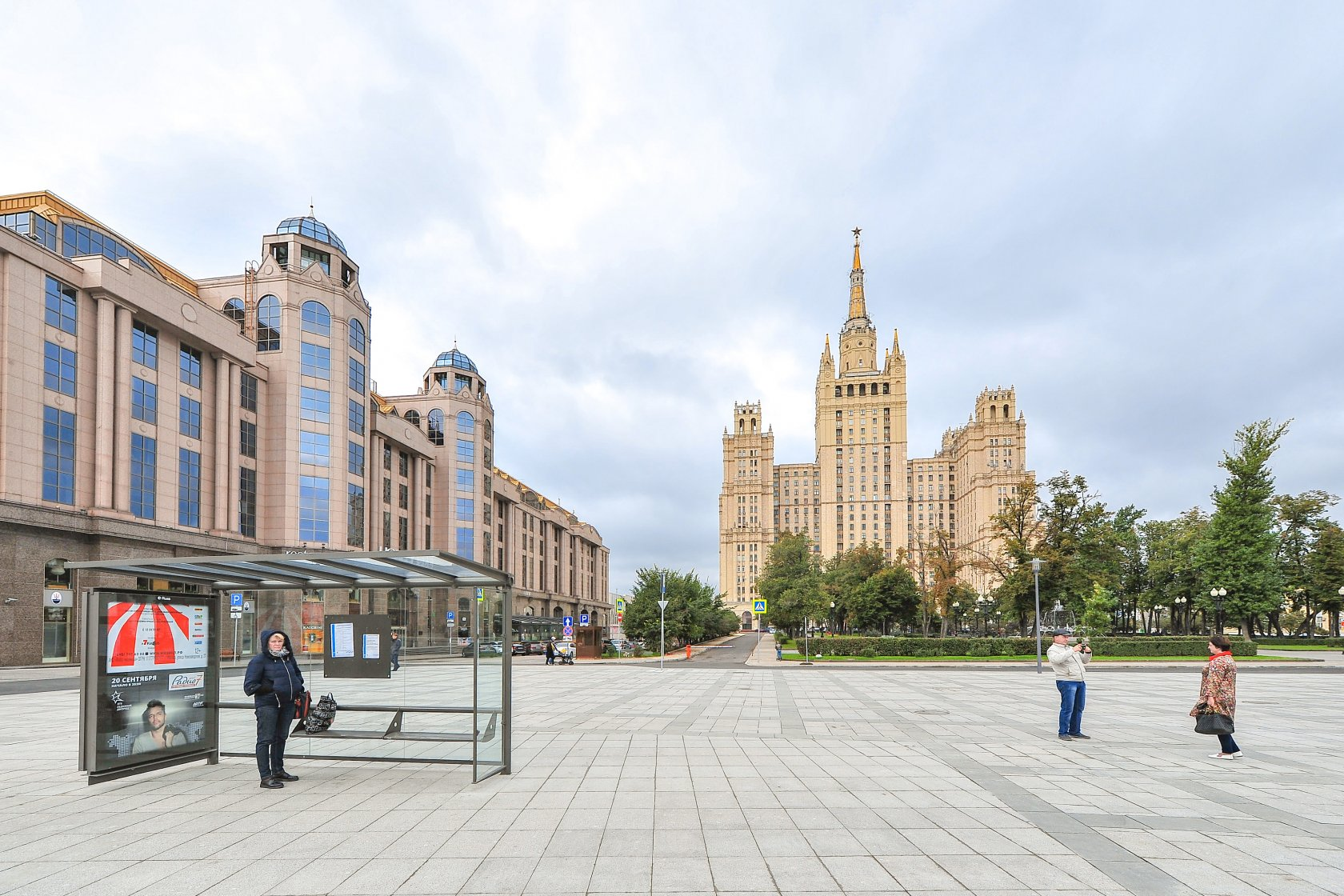
Kudrinskaya Square and Kudrinskaya Square Building

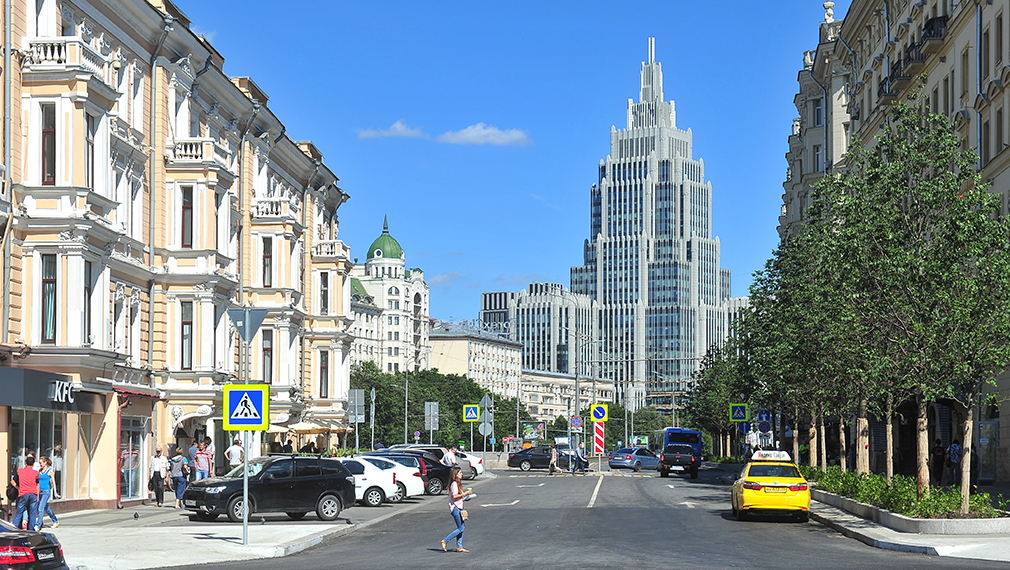
Sadovaya-Triumfalnaya Street

The Ring consists of the following streets and squares, in the clockwise direction,

- Kaluzhskaya Square
- Krymsky Val
- Crimean Square
- Zubovsky Boulevard
- Zubovskaya Square
- Smolensky Boulevard
- Smolenskaya-Sennaya Square
- Novinsky Boulevard
- Kudrinskaya Square
- Sadovaya-Kudrinskaya Street
- Bolshaya Sadovaya Street
- Triumphalnaya Square
- Sadovaya-Triumfalnaya Street
- Sadovaya-Karetnaya Street
- Sadovaya-Samotyochnaya Street
- Samotyochnaya Square
- Sadovaya-Sukharevskaya Street
- Malaya Sukharevskaya Square
- Bolshaya Sukharevskaya Square
- Sadovaya-Spasskaya Street
- Red Gate Square
- Sadovaya-Chernogryazskaya Street
- Zemlyanoy Val Square
- Zemlyanoy Val Street
- Serpukhov Square
- Korovy Val Street
- Zhitnaya Street
- Taganka Square
- Nizhnyaya Krasnokholmskaya Street
- Zatsepsky Val Street
- Valovaya Street

It crosses the Moskva (river) over two bridges, Bolshoy Krasnokholmsky Bridge (which connects the Taganka Square with Nizhnyaya Krasnokholmskaya Street) and Krymsky Bridge (which connects Krymsky Val Street and the Crimean Square). Maly Krasnokholmsky Bridge, connecting Nizhnyaya Krasnokholmskaya Street with Zatsepsky Val Street, is over the Vodootvodny Canal.

== See also ==
- Boulevard Ring in Moscow
- Moscow Ring Road
- Third Ring Road in Moscow
- Ringstraße and Gürtel in Vienna
- Inner Ring Road in London
