= Pavel Yudin (politician) =

Soviet politician (1902–1956)

- Павел Юдин
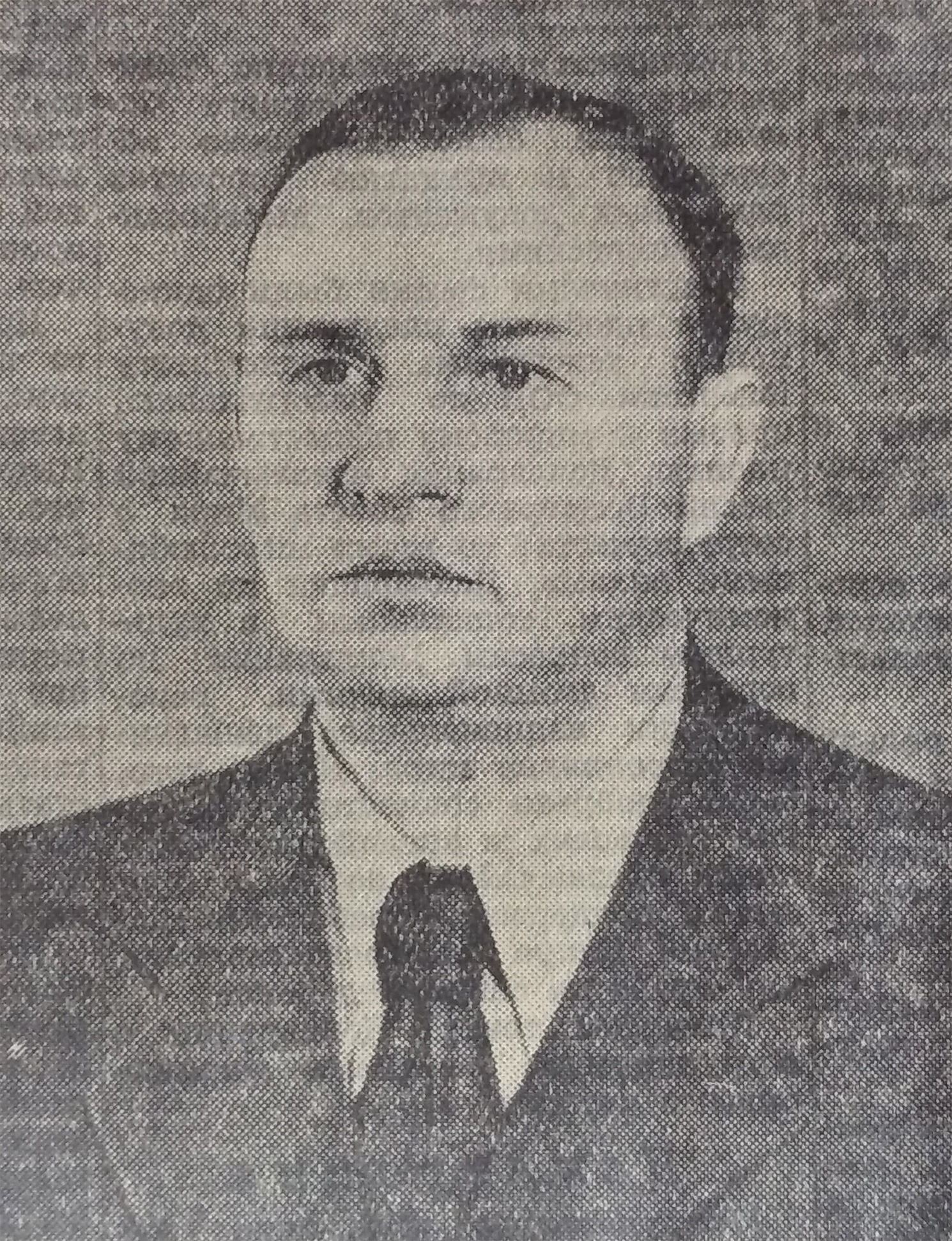
- Yudin c. 1946–1953

Minister of Construction of Heavy Industry of the USSR
- In office 15 March 1946 – 29 May 1950
- Preceded by: Himself (as People's Commissar)
- Succeeded by: David Raidser

Minister of Construction Materials Industry of the USSR
- In office 29 May 1950 – 10 April 1956
- Preceded by: Semyon Ginzburg
- Succeeded by: Lazar Kaganovich

People's Commissar for Construction of Heavy Industry of the USSR
- In office 19 January 1946 – 15 March 1946
- Preceded by: Position established
- Succeeded by: Himself (as Minister)

Personal details
- Born: 31 May [O.S. 18 May] 1902 Tula, Russian Empire
- Died: 10 April 1956 Moscow, Russian SFSR, Soviet Union
- Resting place: Kremlin Wall Necropolis
- Citizenship: Soviet Union
- Party: CPSU (1928–1956)
- Awards: 6 Orders of Lenin and Order of the Red Banner of Labour

Pavel Aleksandrovich Yudin (Russian: Павел Александрович Юдин; 31 May [O.S. 18 May] 1902 – 10 April 1956) was a Soviet politician, statesman and party figure who was the Minister of Construction of Heavy Industry of the Soviet Union from 1946–1950. He oversaw the construction of heavy industry enterprises in the Soviet Union.

== Biography ==
Yudin was born on 31 May 1902 into a working class family in Tula, Russian Empire. He began working in 1917 at the Tula Arms Factory. In 1928, he joined the Communist Party of the Soviet Union.

In 1930, he was an engineer at the construction of a chemical plant in Alchevsk, he was appointed as the chief engineer, then head of Construction of a chemical plant in Kharkov. From 1933–1935, he held the management positions in the Burugol, Odessa region. Also the chief engineer of the Metallstroy trust in Moscow, 1935. In 1937, a manager of the Kokshimmontazh trust in Kharkov.

Yudin was the head of the Main Directorate of the Chemical Industry of the People's Commissariat of Heavy Industry of the USSR from 1937–1939. In 1939, appointed as the Deputy People's Commissar of the Fuel Industry of the USSR. He was appointed as the first Deputy People's Commissar for Construction of the USSR from 1940–1946. He was personally responsible for the timeliness of construction and installation of equipment at factories evacuated to the Urals and producing KV tanks and other weapons.

In 1946–1950, he was appointed by the party as the Minister of Construction of Heavy Industry of the USSR. Then in 1950, as the Minister of the Construction Materials Industry of the USSR. In 1952, he was elected on 14 October 1952 at the 19th Congress of the CPSU and a candidate member of the Central Committee of the CPSU, re-elected on 25 February 1956 at the 20th Congress. In 1954, he was elected as a Deputy of the Supreme Soviet of the USSR.

== Death and awards ==
He died on 10 April 1956 and was buried at the Kremlin Wall Necropolis. He was awarded 6 Orders of Lenin for his hardwork and Order of the Red Banner of Labour.
