= Red Gate Building =

Stalinist skyscraper in Moscow

- Высотное здание на площади Красных Ворот
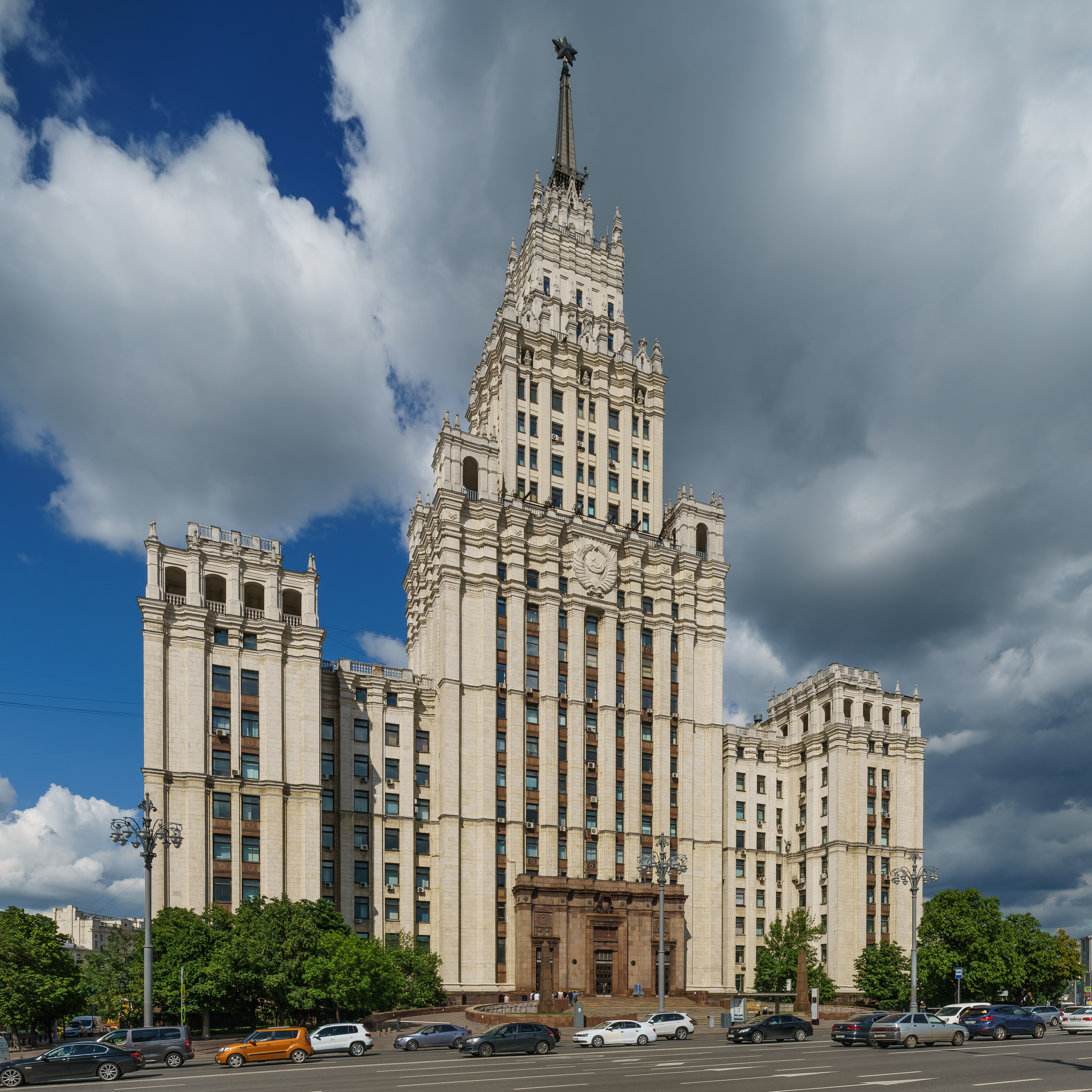
- Interactive map of the Red Gate Building area

General information
- Architectural style: Stalinist
- Location: Moscow, Russia
- Coordinates: 55°46′10″N 37°38′45″E
- Completed: 1953

Height
- Roof: 133 m (436 ft)

Technical details
- Floor count: 24

Design and construction
- Architect: Alexey Dushkin

The Red Gate Building is one of seven Stalinist skyscrapers, designed by Alexey Dushkin. Its name comes from the Red Gate square.

== Features ==
The 138-metre building consists of a central 24-storey building and two side buildings with a variable number of storeys ranging from 11 to 15. The exterior walls of the skyscraper are clad in natural limestone, while the ground floors are clad in red granite. The interiors of the building are more modest than in other Stalinist skyscrapers. For example, stainless steel was used in the front lobby and there are no expensive materials or picturesque panels.

The central building on the courtyard side had an assembly hall (on the ground floor) and an exhibition hall (on the basement). A tunnel was created along the perimeter of the basement with an entrance from the side of Komsomolskaya Square. It was intended for trucks serving the services of the building. The building was originally built for the needs of the Ministry of Railways. However, by 1951, when the works were completed, a new union agency Mintransstroi existed and it got the offices in the central block of the skyscraper.

All flats had refrigerators, built-in-furniture and sinks with a crusher to destroy large waste in the kitchens. The kitchens also had access to a rubbish chute. In addition to the traditional ventilation system, the house had central air conditioning. For this purpose, outdoor air was filtered and passed through a humidification system before reaching a temperature of +15 °C. Then, depending on the season, the air was heated to the right temperature. All high-rise buildings were equipped with a centralised dust extraction system, which consisted of a system of brushes and hoses located in each flat, a system of pipes running along with the building and dust extraction stations installed in the basement. The collected dust was filtered and discharged into the sewage system, and the purified air from the system was discharged into the street. Boilers were installed in the basement to provide heating for the skyscraper.

== History ==
The skyscraper was laid down in 1947 and completed in 1953. The construction of the tower was complicated by its location near the Moscow Metro tunnels and the Krasnye Vorota station. Dushkin built a second entrance to the station into the ground floor of the tower, which opened on 31 July 1954.

After being the headquarter of the Ministry of Construction of Heavy Industry the administrative part of the skyscraper also hosted the Ministry of Transport Construction. The building is also known as Lermontov Tower from Mikhail Lermontov, who was born on its place, and the Lermontovskaya Square, the name assigned to the Red Gate square between 1962 and 1986.
