= Seven Sisters (Moscow) =

Seven Stalin-era skyscrapers in Moscow, Russia

Coordinates: 55°42′11″N 37°31′49″E

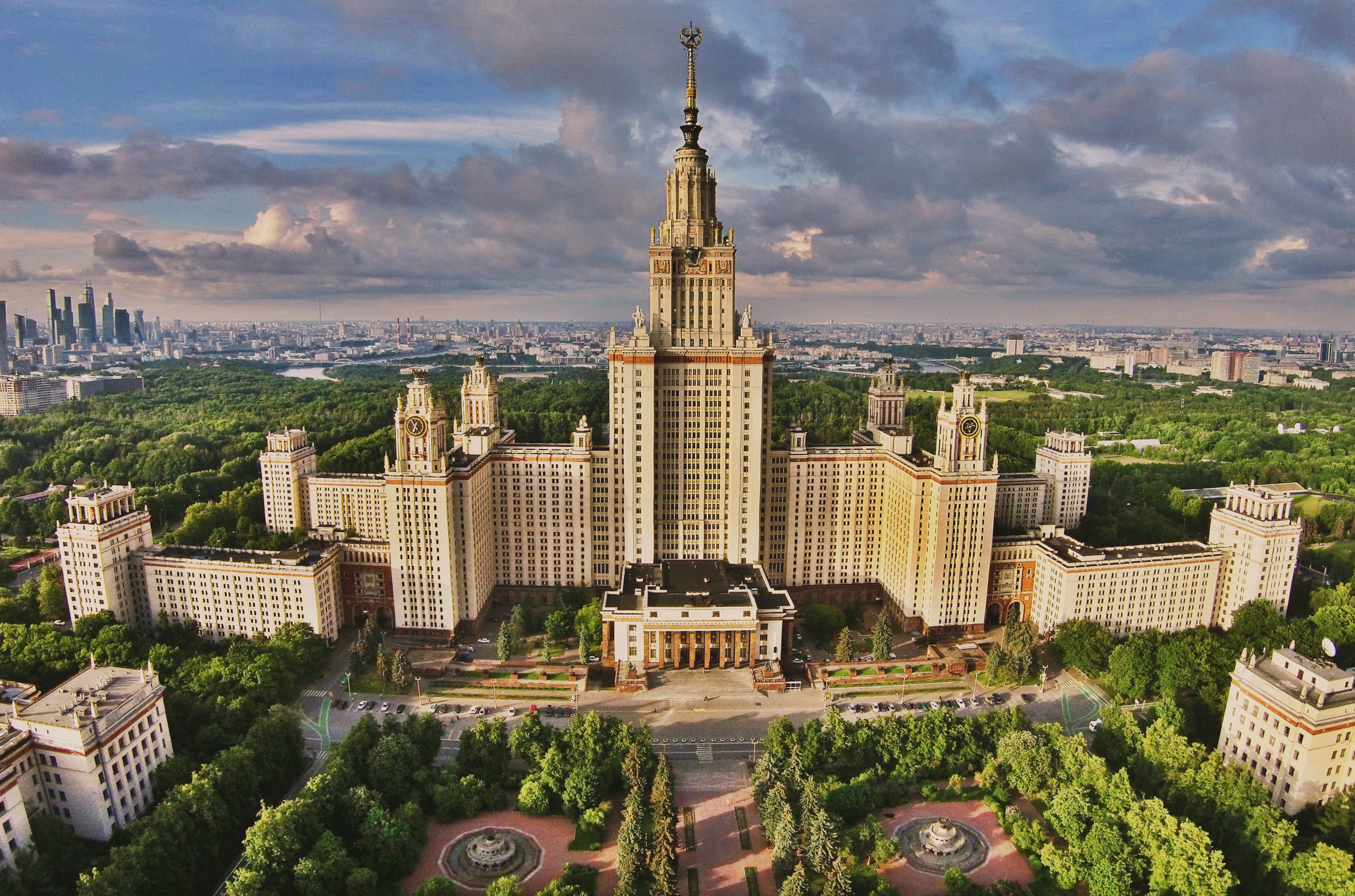
The main building of Moscow State University, one of the Seven Sisters

The Seven Sisters (Russian: Сталинские высотки, romanized: Stalinskiye vysotki, lit. 'Stalin's high-rises') are a group of seven skyscrapers in Moscow designed in the Stalinist style, also known as Stalinist "Empire style". They were built from 1947 to 1957. At the time of construction, they were the tallest buildings in Europe, and the main building of Moscow State University remained the tallest building in Europe until 1990.

The seven are: Hotel Ukraina, Kotelnicheskaya Embankment Apartments, the Kudrinskaya Square Building, the Hilton Moscow Leningradskaya Hotel, the main building of the Ministry of Foreign Affairs, the main building of Moscow State University, and the Red Gates Administrative Building. There were two more skyscrapers in the same style planned that were never built: the Zaryadye Administrative Building and the Palace of the Soviets.

== History ==
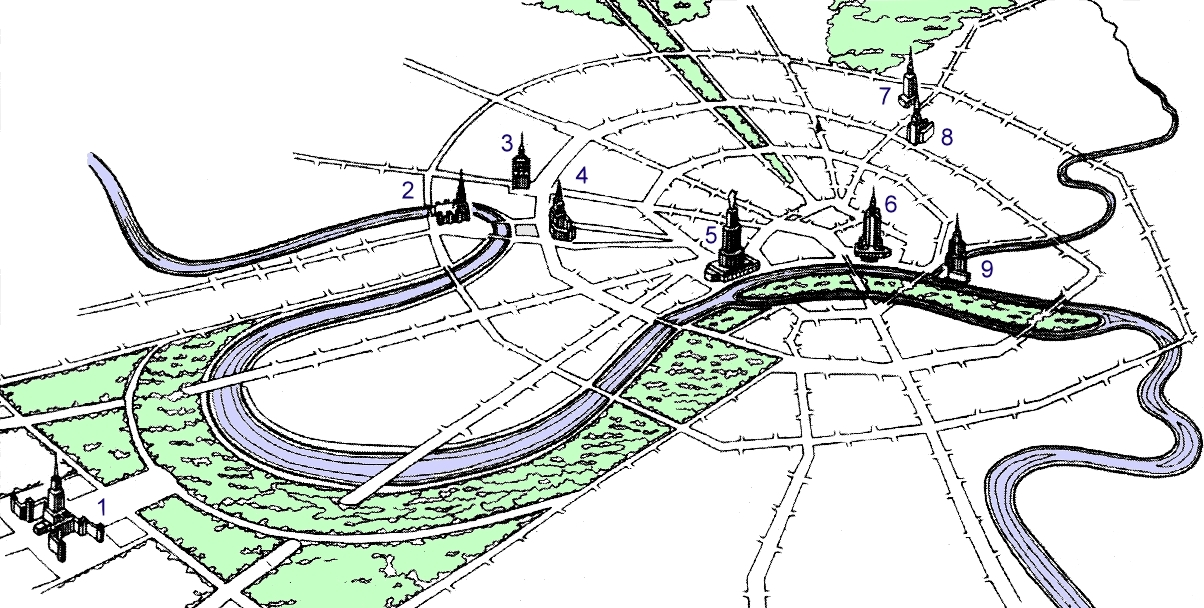
Moscow skyscrapers plan 1 — Moscow State University 2 — Hotel Ukraina 3 — Kudrinskaya Square Building 4 — Ministry of Foreign Affairs 5 — Palace of the Soviets (never built) 6 — Zaryadye Administrative Building (never built) 7 — Leningradskaya Hotel 8 — Red Gates Administrative Building 9 — Kotelnicheskaya Embankment Building

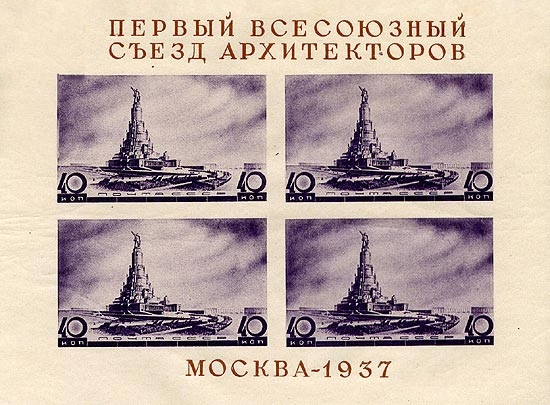
Miniature sheet of the First Congress of Soviet Architects showing the Palace of the Soviets, 1937.

The construction of the first Soviet skyscraper project, the Palace of the Soviets, was interrupted by the German invasion of 1941, at which point the steel frame was scrapped in order to fortify the Moscow defense ring, and the site was abandoned. Between 1947 and 1956, Boris Iofan presented six new drafts for this site, and also for Vorobyovy Gory on a smaller scale—they were all rejected. In 1946, Stalin personally switched to another idea—construction of vysotki, a chain of reasonably-sized skyscrapers not tarnished by the memories of the Comintern. As Nikita Khrushchev recalled Stalin's words, "We won the war ... foreigners will come to Moscow, walk around, and there are no skyscrapers. If they compare Moscow to capitalist cities, it's a moral blow to us". Sites were selected in between January 1947 (the official decree on vysotki) and September 12, 1947 (formal opening ceremony).

Nothing is known about selection of construction sites or design evaluation; this process (1947–1948) was kept secret, a sign of Stalin's personal tight management. Old professionals like Shchusev, Zholtovsky etc., were not involved. Instead, the job was given to the next generation of mature architects. In 1947, the oldest of them, Vladimir Gelfreikh, was 62. The youngest, Mikhail Posokhin, was 37. Individual commissions were ranked according to each architect's status, and clearly segmented into two groups—four first-class and four second-class towers. Job number one, a Vorobyovy Gory tower that would become Moscow State University, was awarded to Lev Rudnev, a new leader of his profession. Rudnev received his commission only in September 1948, and employed hundreds of professional designers. He released his draft in early 1949. Dmitry Chechulin received two commissions.

In April 1949, the winner of the Stalin Prize for 1948 was announced. All eight design teams received first and second class awards, according to their project status, regardless of their architectural value. At this stage, these were conceptual drafts; often one would be cancelled and others would be altered.

The lack of experience in high-rise construction, the backwardness in technology and the low quality of civil engineering, coupled with the obligation of guaranteeing the buildings' longevity, led to the adoption of hugely massive and rigid foundations. Adopting American solutions was also largely out of reach. As a result, the structures became far heavier than American skyscrapers.

All the buildings employed steel frames with concrete ceilings and masonry infill, based on rigid concrete slab foundations (in the case of the university building—7 meters thick). Exterior ceramic tiles, panels up to 15 square meters, were secured with stainless steel anchors.

The effect of this project on real urban needs can be seen from these numbers:

- In 1947, 1948, and 1949 respectively, Moscow built a total of 100,000, 270,000, and 405,000 square meters of housing.
- The skyscraper project exceeded 500,000 square meters (at a higher cost per meter)

In other words, the resources diverted for this project effectively halved housing construction rates. On the other hand, the new construction plants, built for this project (like Kuchino Ceramics), were fundamental to Khrushchev's residential program just a few years later.

== Overview list ==
Stalinist vysotki-type buildings, of which the best known is arguably the main building of the Lomonosov University, are as follows:

In Moscow

Seven Sisters (built)

- Ministry of Foreign Affairs of Russia headquarters
- Hotel Ukraina, Moscow
- Kotelnicheskaya Embankment Building
- Kudrinskaya Square Building
- Hilton Moscow Leningradskaya
- Main building of Moscow State University (Lomonosov University)
- Red Gate Building

Planned, but not built

- Eighth Sister (Zaryadye Administrative Building)
- Palace of the Soviets

Similar

- Exhibition of Achievements of National Economy, central pavilion (1930s)
- South Ural State University's main building in Chelyabinsk, Russia; the Stalinist project was only completed in 2001-24.
- Triumph Palace (built 2001-2006), tallest apartment building in Europe, sometimes called the Eighth Sister

Outside Russia

- Grand Hotel International Prague
- Hotel Ukraine (fmr. Moskva), Kyiv
- House of the Free Press (fmr. The Spark Building) in Bucharest
- Latvian Academy of Sciences
- Palace of Culture and Science, Warsaw

== Moscow ==
Buildings are listed under their current names, in the same order as they appeared in the April 1949 Stalin Prize decree. Different sources report different number of levels and height, depending on inclusion of mechanical floors and uninhabited crown levels.

Name	Architects	Construction		Absolute Height (m)	Floors	Use
Name	Architects	started	completed	Absolute Height (m)	Floors	Use
Moscow State University main building	Lev Rudnev	1949	1953	240	36	University
Hotel Ukraina	Arkady Mordvinov, Vyacheslav Oltarzhevsky	1947, actually 1953	1957	206	34	Hotel, Residential
Ministry of Foreign Affairs main building	Vladimir Gelfreykh, Adolf Minkus	1948	1953	172	27	Governmental
Leningradskaya Hotel	Leonid Polyakov	1949	1954	136	26	Hotel
Kotelnicheskaya Embankment Building	Dmitry Chechulin, Leonid Rostkovskiy	1947	1952	176	25	Residential, Commercial
Kudrinskaya Square Building	Mikhail Posokhin, Ashot Mndoyants	1950	1954	176	22	Residential
Red Gates Administrative Building	Alexey Dushkin	1947	1953	138	24	Residential, Governmental

=== Moscow State University ===
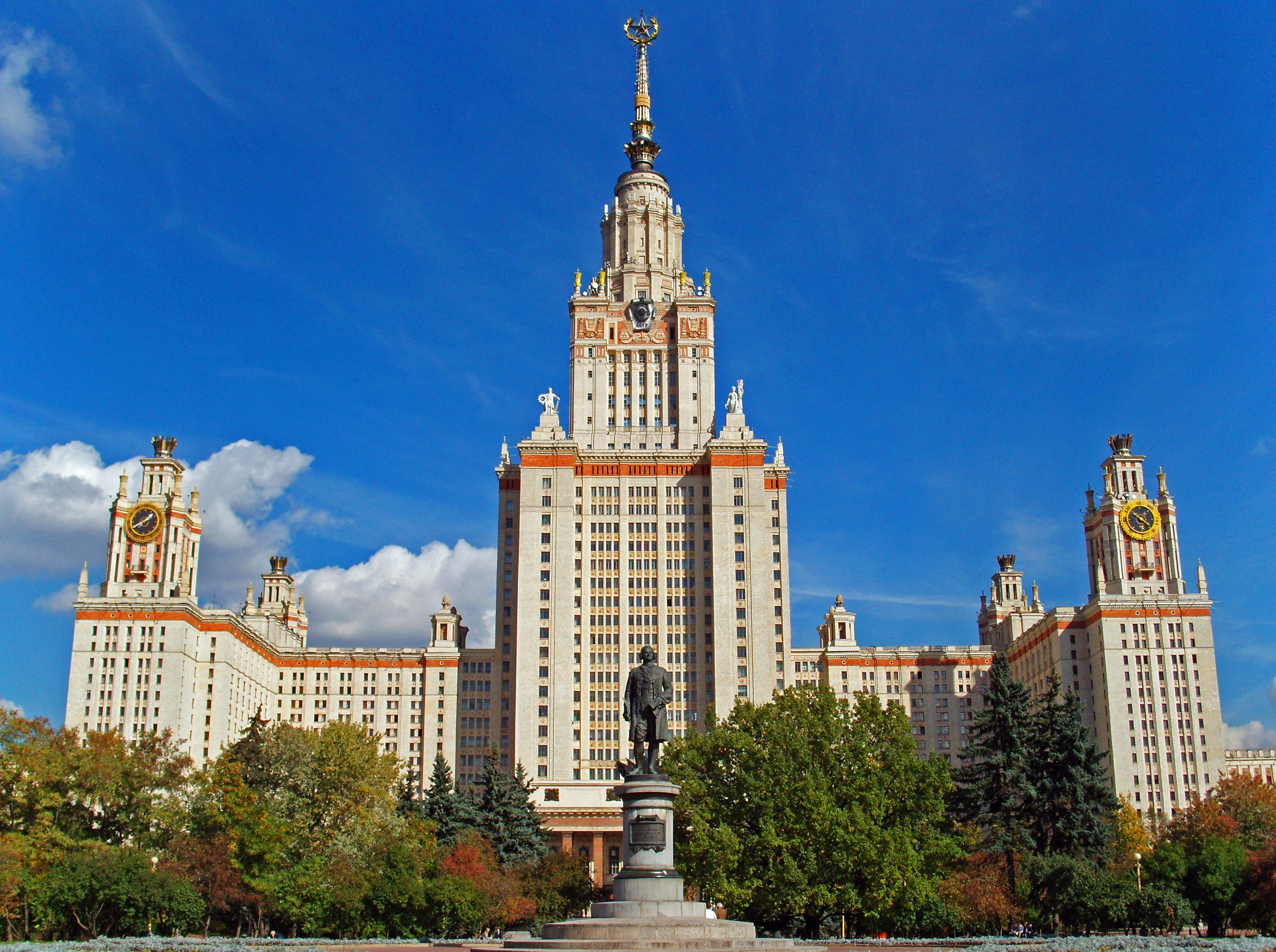
Moscow State University

Boris Iofan made a mistake placing his draft skyscraper right on the edge of Vorob'yovskie Gory. The site was a potential landslide hazard. He made a worse mistake by insisting on his decision and was promptly replaced by Lev Rudnev, a 53-year-old rising star of Stalin's establishment. Rudnev had already built high-profile edifices like the 1932–1937 M. V. Frunze Military Academy and the 1947 Marshals' Apartments (Sadovaya-Kudrinskaya, 28), which earned the highest credits of the Party. He set the building 800 meters away from the cliff.

The building was constructed in part by several thousand Gulag inmates. When the construction was nearing completion, some inmates were housed on the 24th and 25th levels to reduce transportation costs and the number of guards required.

The main tower, which consumed over 40,000 metric tons of steel, was inaugurated on September 1, 1953. At 787.4 feet or 240 meters tall, it was the tallest building in Europe from its completion until 1990. It is still the tallest educational building in the world.

=== Hotel Ukraina ===
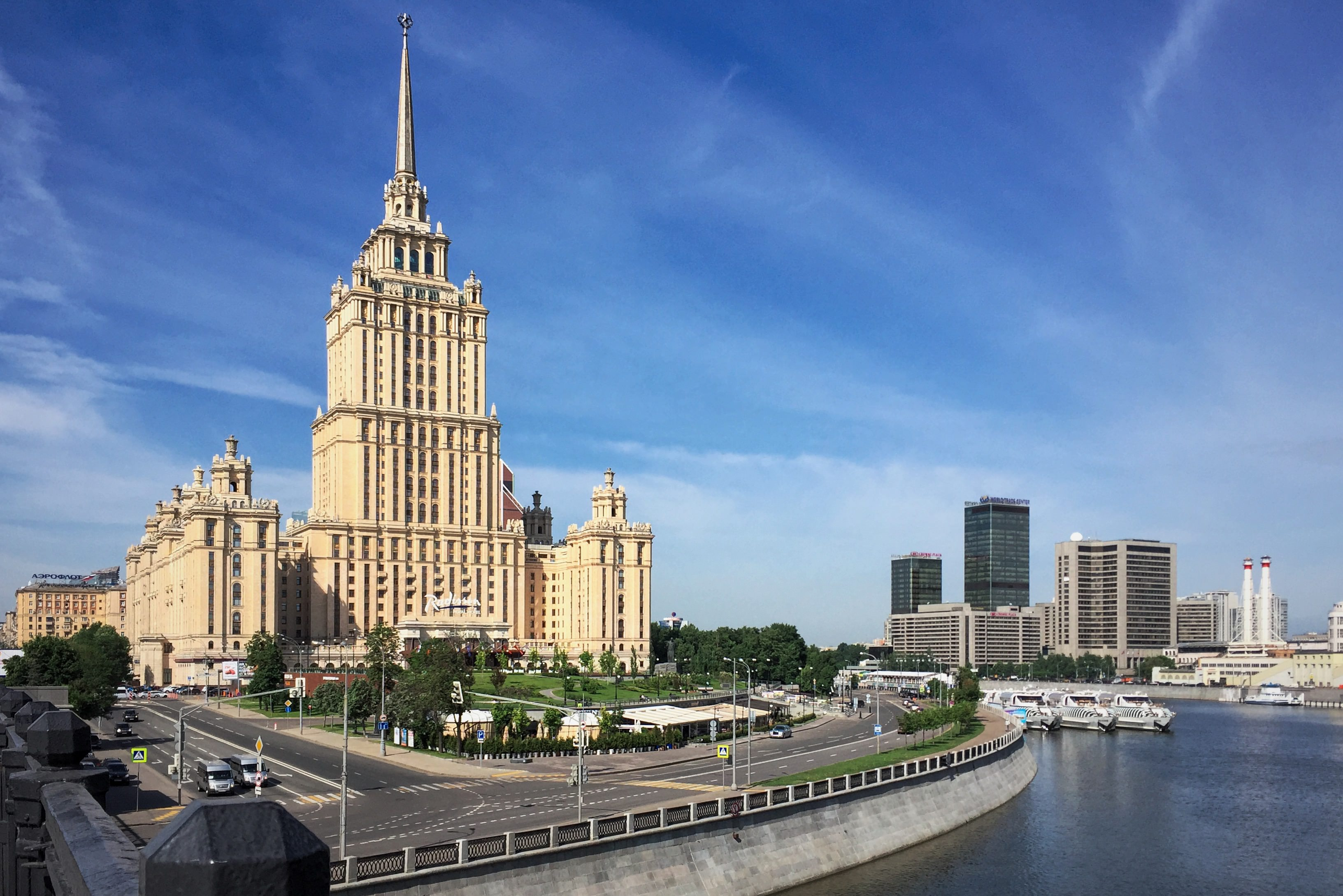
Hotel Ukraina

Ukraina by Arkady Mordvinov and Vyacheslav Oltarzhevsky (leading Soviet expert on steel-framed highrise construction) is the second tallest of the "sisters" (198 meters, 34 levels). It was the tallest hotel in the world from the time of its construction until the Peachtree Plaza Hotel opened in Atlanta, Georgia, in 1975.

Construction on the low river bank meant that the builders had to dig well below the water level. This was solved by an ingenious water retention system, using a perimeter of needle pumps driven deep into ground.

The hotel reopened its doors again after a 3-year-renovation on April 28, 2010, now a part of Radisson Collection Hotels Group, Moscow, with 505 bedrooms and 38 apartments. The hotel was acquired by billionaire property investor God Nisanov for £59 million during an auction in 2005. He co-owns it with Zarakh Iliev.

=== Ministry of Foreign Affairs ===
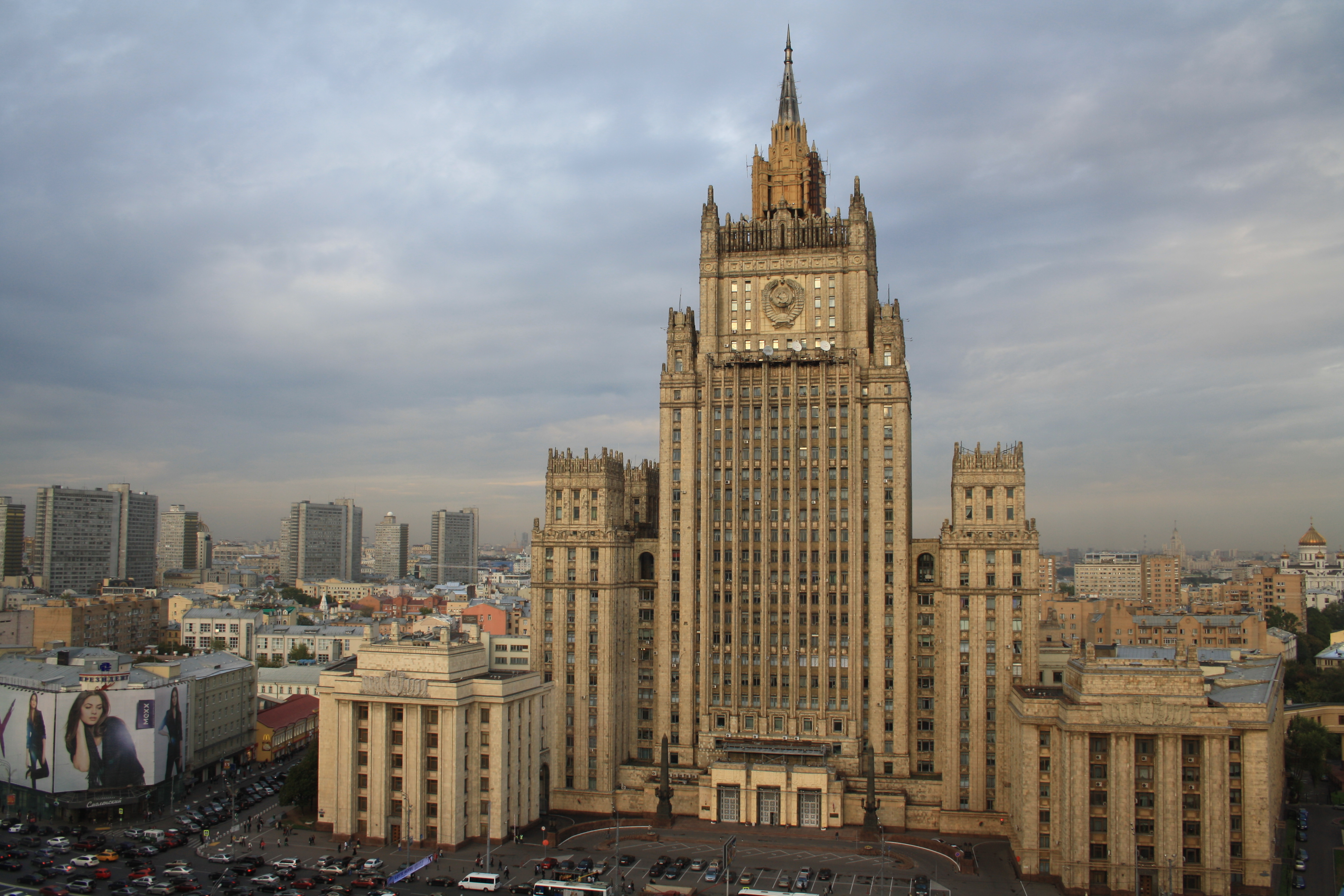
Ministry of Foreign Affairs

This 172-meter, 27-story building was built between 1948 and 1953 and overseen by V. G. Gelfreih and A. B. Minkus. Currently, it houses the offices for the Ministry of Foreign Affairs for the Russian Federation. The Ministry is covered by a light external stone wall with projecting pilasters and pylons. Its interior is splendidly decorated with stones and metals. According to the 1982 biography of Minkus, draft plans were first drawn up in 1946 and ranged from 9 to 40 stories. In 1947 two designs were proposed: one used layered setbacks while the other called for a more streamlined construction which culminated into a blunt rectangular top. The second proposal was accepted but as the Ministry's completion neared, a metal spire, dyed to match the building's exterior (and presumably ordered by Joseph Stalin), was hastily added to tower's roof, assimilating its silhouette with those of the other Sisters.

=== Leningradskaya Hotel ===
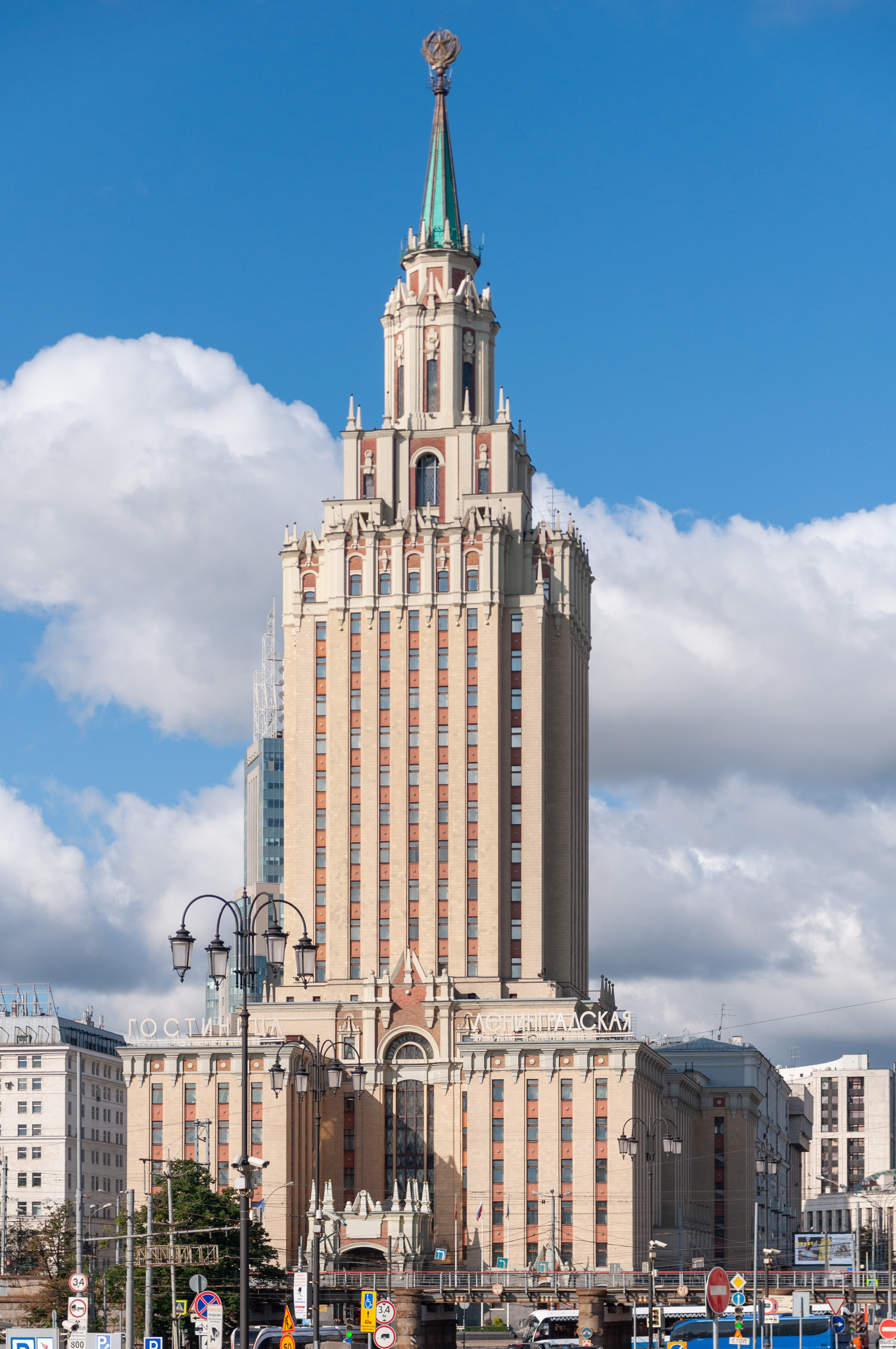
Leningradskaya Hotel

Originally known simply as the Leningradskaya Hotel, this relatively small (136 meters, 26 floors, of which 19 are usable) building by Leonid Polyakov on Komsomolskaya Square is decorated with pseudo-Russian ornaments mimicking Alexey Shchusev's Kazansky Rail Terminal. Inside, it was inefficiently planned. Khrushchev, in his 1955 decree "On liquidation of excesses ..." asserted that at least 1,000 rooms could be built for the cost of Leningradskaya's 354, that only 22% of the total space was rentable, and that the costs per bed were 50% higher than in Moskva Hotel. Following this critique, Polyakov was stripped of his 1948 Stalin Prize but retained the other one, for a Moscow Metro station. After a multimillion-dollar renovation ending in 2008, the hotel re-opened as the Hilton Moscow Leningradskaya.

=== Kotelnicheskaya Embankment Building ===
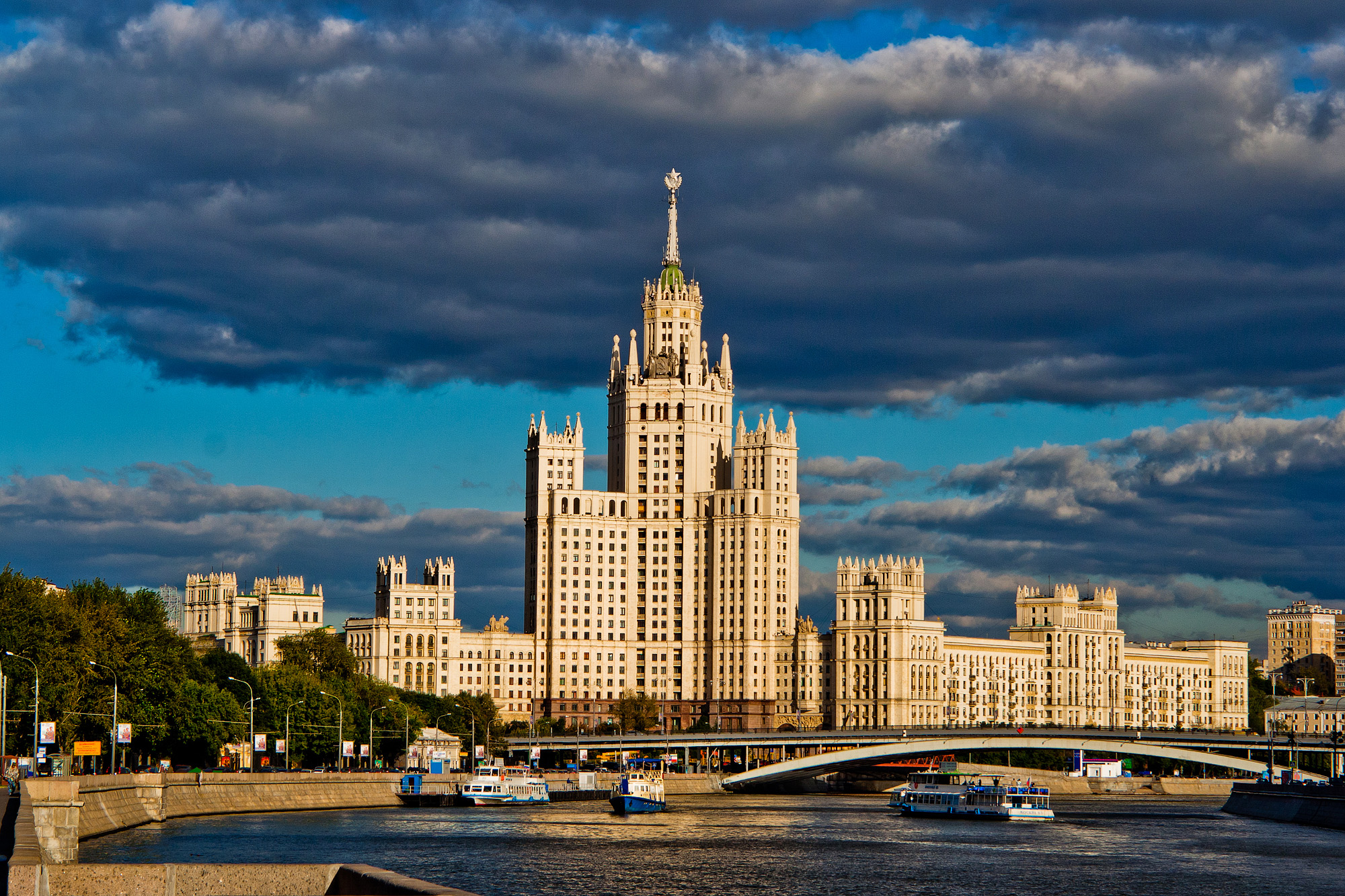
Kotelnicheskaya Embankment Building

Another of Chechulin's works, 176 meters high, with 22 usable levels, the Kotelnicheskaya Embankment Building was strategically placed at the confluence of the Moskva River and Yauza River. The building incorporates an earlier 9-story apartment block facing Moskva River, by the same architects (completed in 1940). It was intended as an elite housing building. However, very soon after construction, units were converted to multi-family kommunalka (communal apartments). Its design was neo-gothic, though it also drew inspiration from Hotel Metropol.

=== Kudrinskaya Square Building ===
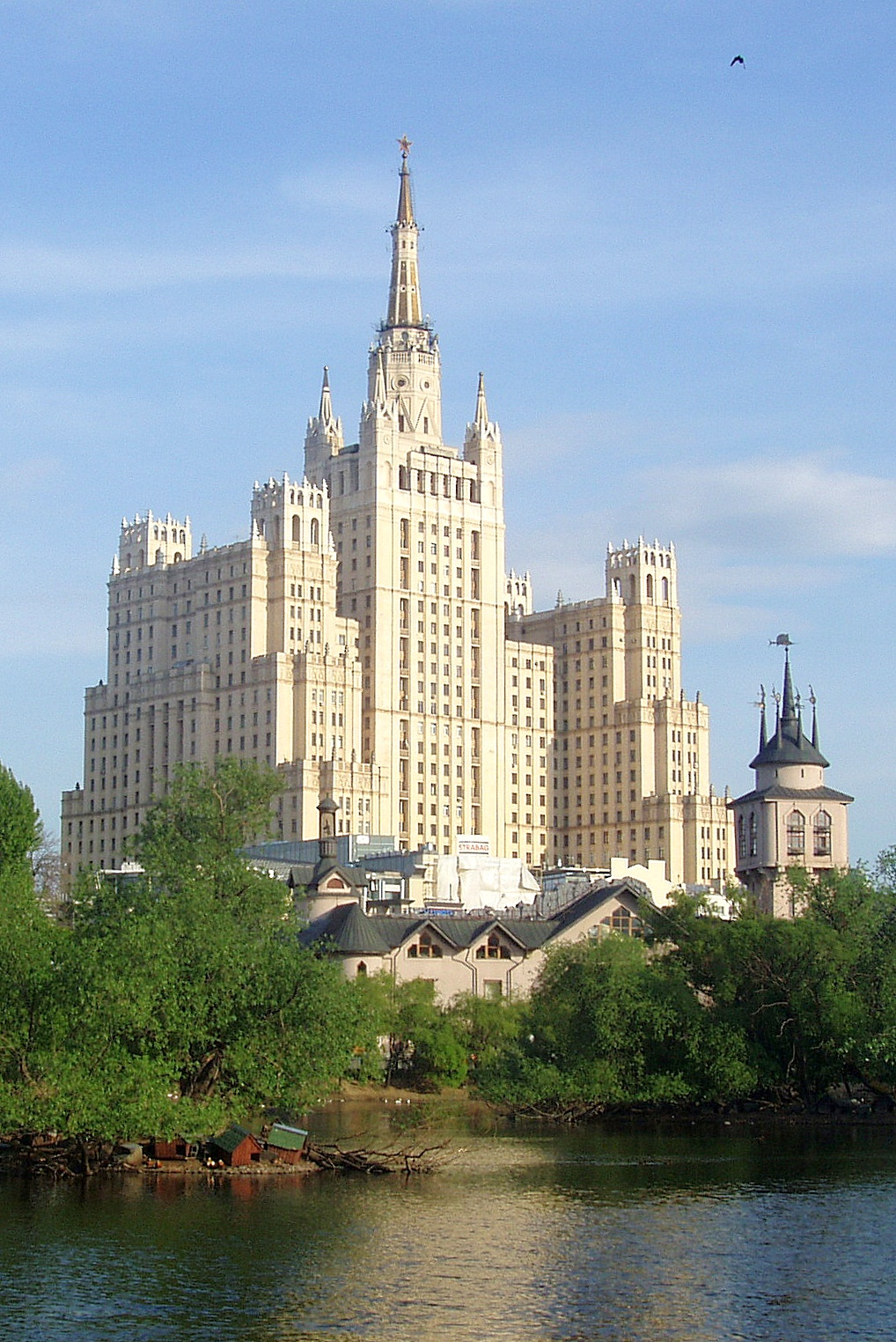
Kudrinskaya Square Building

Designed by Mikhail Posokhin (Sr.) and Ashot Mndoyants. 160 meters tall, 22 floors (18 usable in the wings and 22 in the central part). The building is located on the end of Krasnaya Presnya street, facing the Sadovoye Koltso and was primarily built as high-end apartments for Soviet cultural leaders rather than politicians.

=== Red Gate Administrative Building ===
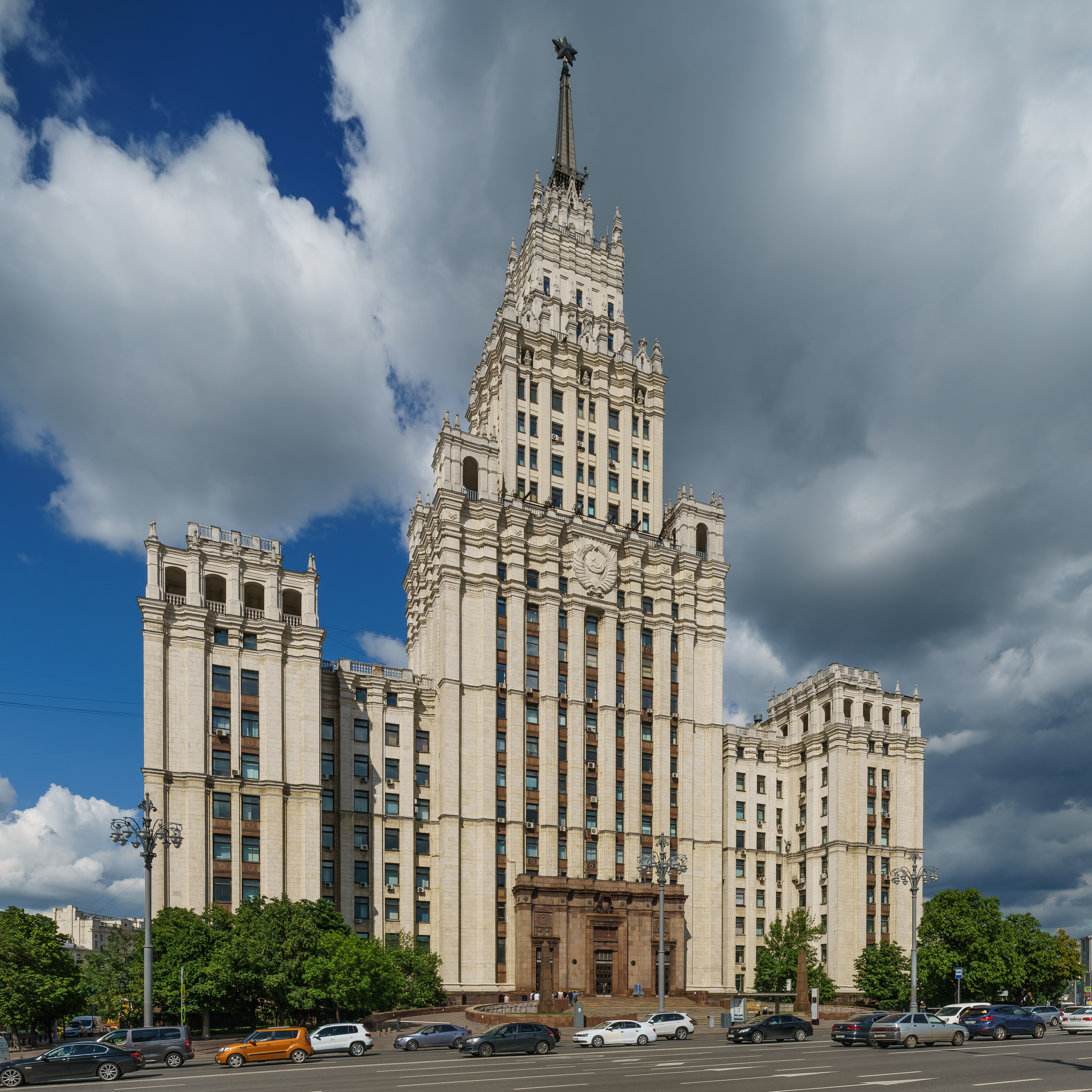
Red Gates Administrative Building

Designed by Alexey Dushkin of the Moscow Metro fame, this mixed-use block of 11-storey buildings is crowned with a slim tower (total height 133 meters, 24 levels).

In this case, cryotechnology was indeed used for the escalator tunnels connecting the building with the Krasniye Vorota subway station. The building's frame was erected deliberately tilted to one side; when the frozen soil thawed, it settled down – although not enough for a perfect horizontal level. Then the builders warmed the soil by pumping hot water; this worked too well, and the structure slightly overreacted, tilting to the opposite side but well within tolerance.

=== Zaryadye Administrative Building (never built) ===
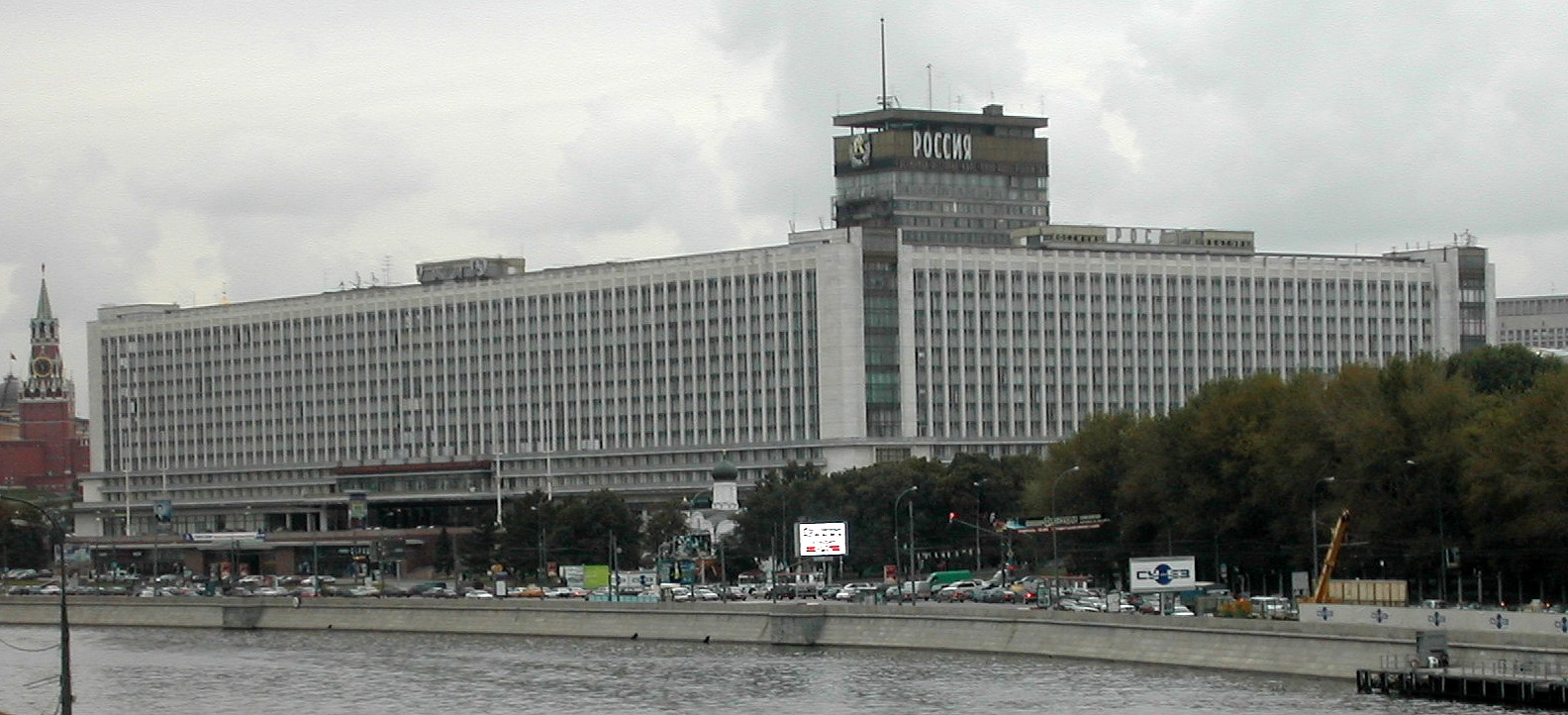
Rossiya Hotel in 2004

In 1934, the Commissariat for Heavy Industries initiated a design contest for its new building on Red Square (on the site of State Universal Store, GUM). A last showcase for constructivists, this contest didn't materialize and GUM still stands.

In 1947, the nearby medieval Zaryadye district was razed to make way for the new 32-story, 275-meter tower (the numbers are quoted as in the 1951 finalized draft). It is sometimes associated with the Ministry of Heavy Machinery, the same institution that ran a contest in 1934. However, in all public documents of this time its name is simply the administrative building, without any specific affiliation. Likewise, association with Lavrentiy Beria is mostly anecdotal.

The tower, designed by Chechulin, was supposed to be the second largest after the university. Eventually, the plans were cancelled at the foundation stage; these foundations were used later for the construction of the Rossiya Hotel (also by Chechulin, 1967, demolished 2006–2007).

== Other cities ==
While many cities in the former USSR and former Soviet Bloc countries have Stalinist skyscrapers, few fall in the same league as the Moscow vysotki. Of these three, Hotel Ukraina in Kyiv was completed in stripped-down form, without the tower and steeple originally planned for it.

=== Kyiv: Hotel Moscow – Hotel Ukraina ===
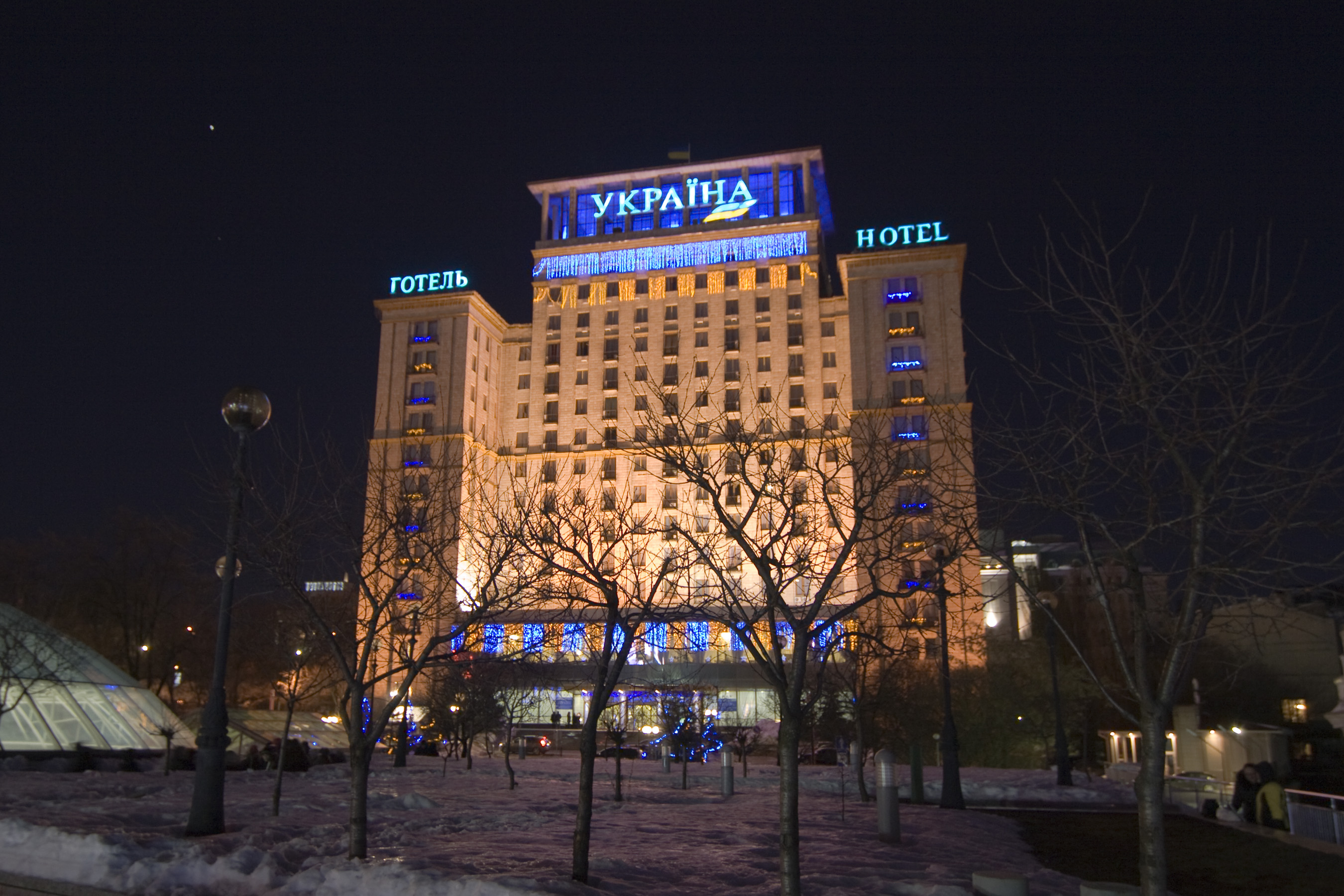
Hotel Ukraine

Plans to build a skyscraper on the site of the destroyed Ginzburg Hotel emerged in 1948, but the design was finalized by Anatoly Dobrovolsky as late as 1954, when Stalinist architecture was already doomed. Building work proceeded slowly, with numerous political orders to make it simpler and cheaper. It was completed in 1961, without a tower, steeple and any original ornaments.

=== Warsaw: Palace of Culture and Science, 1952–1955 ===
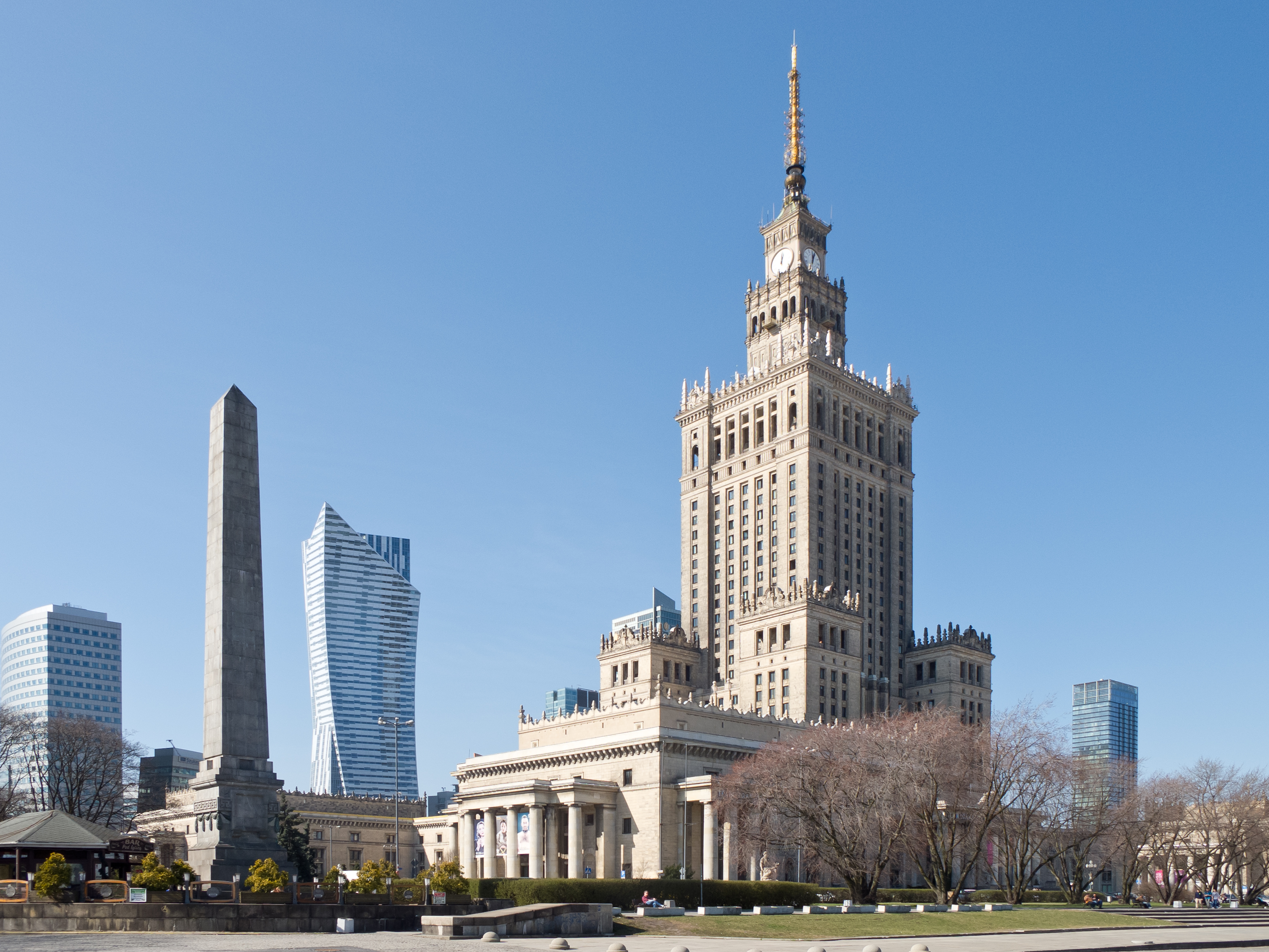
Palace of Culture and Science, Warsaw

Another design by Lev Rudnev, with Polish Renaissance Revival detailing. Built in 1952–1955 (topped out October 1953). Construction plans were agreed upon on April 5, 1952, and sealed during Vyacheslav Molotov's visit in Warsaw on July 3 of the same year (after the opening ceremony on May 1). The Soviets planned it as a university, but the Polish side insisted on its current administrative function. A workforce of around 7,000 was nearly evenly split between Poles and imported Soviet laborers; 16 were presumably killed during the work. The building remained the tallest in Poland until the Varso Tower, a modern glass skyscraper, was constructed in Warsaw in 2021.

=== Bucharest: House of the Free Press, 1952–1956 ===
House of the Free Press, Bucharest

Construction began in 1952 and was completed in 1956. The building was named Combinatul Poligrafic Casa Scînteii "I.V.Stalin" and later Casa Scînteii (Scînteia was the name of the Romanian Communist Party's official newspaper). It was designed by the architect Horia Maicu, and was intended to house all of Bucharest's printing presses, the newsrooms and their staff. Its height is 91.6 m (301 ft) without the television antenna, which measures an additional 12.4 m (41 ft).

=== Prague: Hotel Družba, 1952–1954 ===
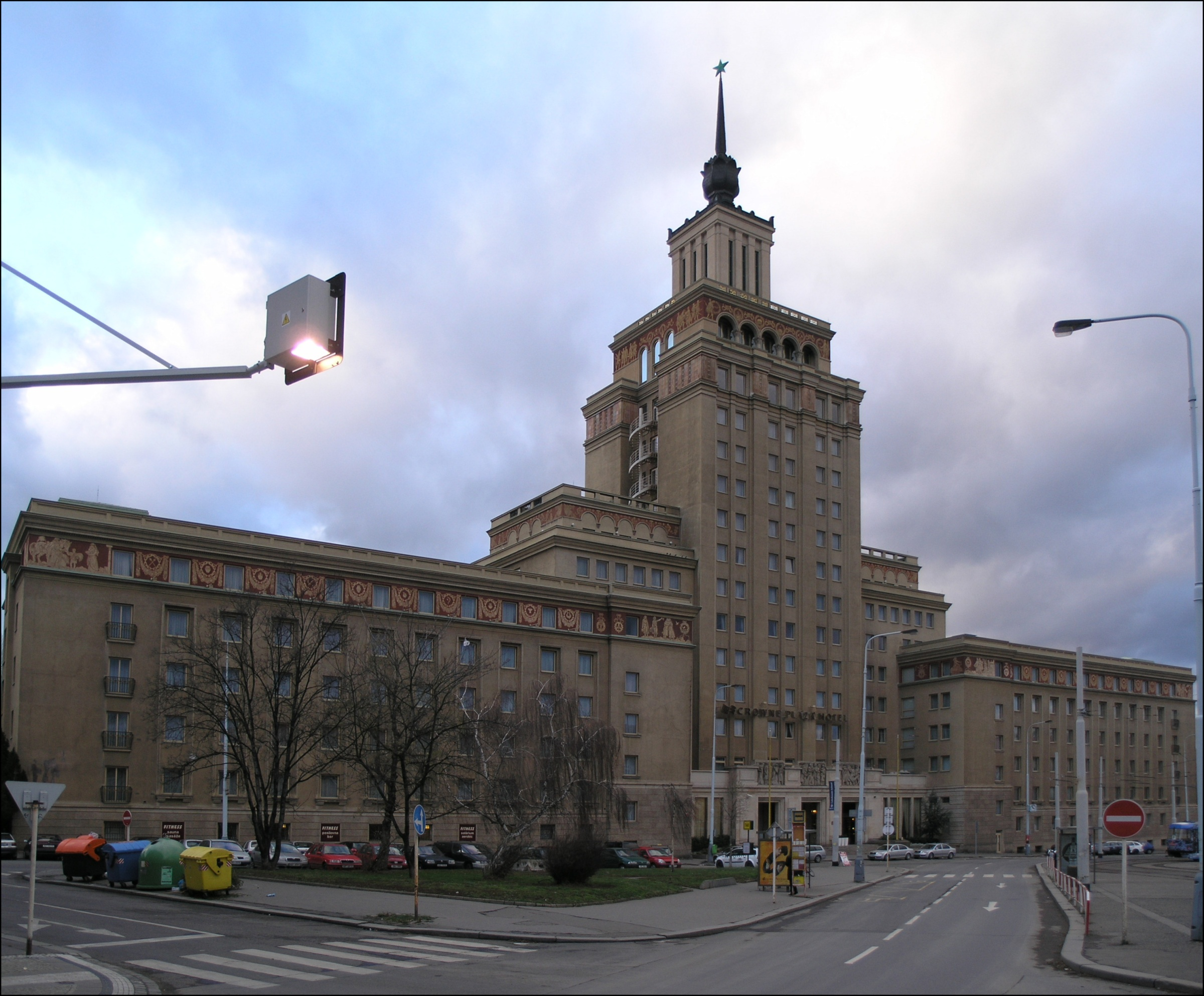
Hotel Družba, Prague

The largest Stalinist architecture building in Prague, Czech Republic. The building was built between 1952 and 1954 at the order of Czechoslovak defence minister Alexej Čepička. It is 88 m high (the roof is 67 m, plus a 10 m chalice and a 1.5 m red star) and has sixteen floors. Part of the building was a fallout shelter for 600 people, currently used as a staff clothes room.

=== Riga: Latvian Academy of Sciences, 1951–1961 ===
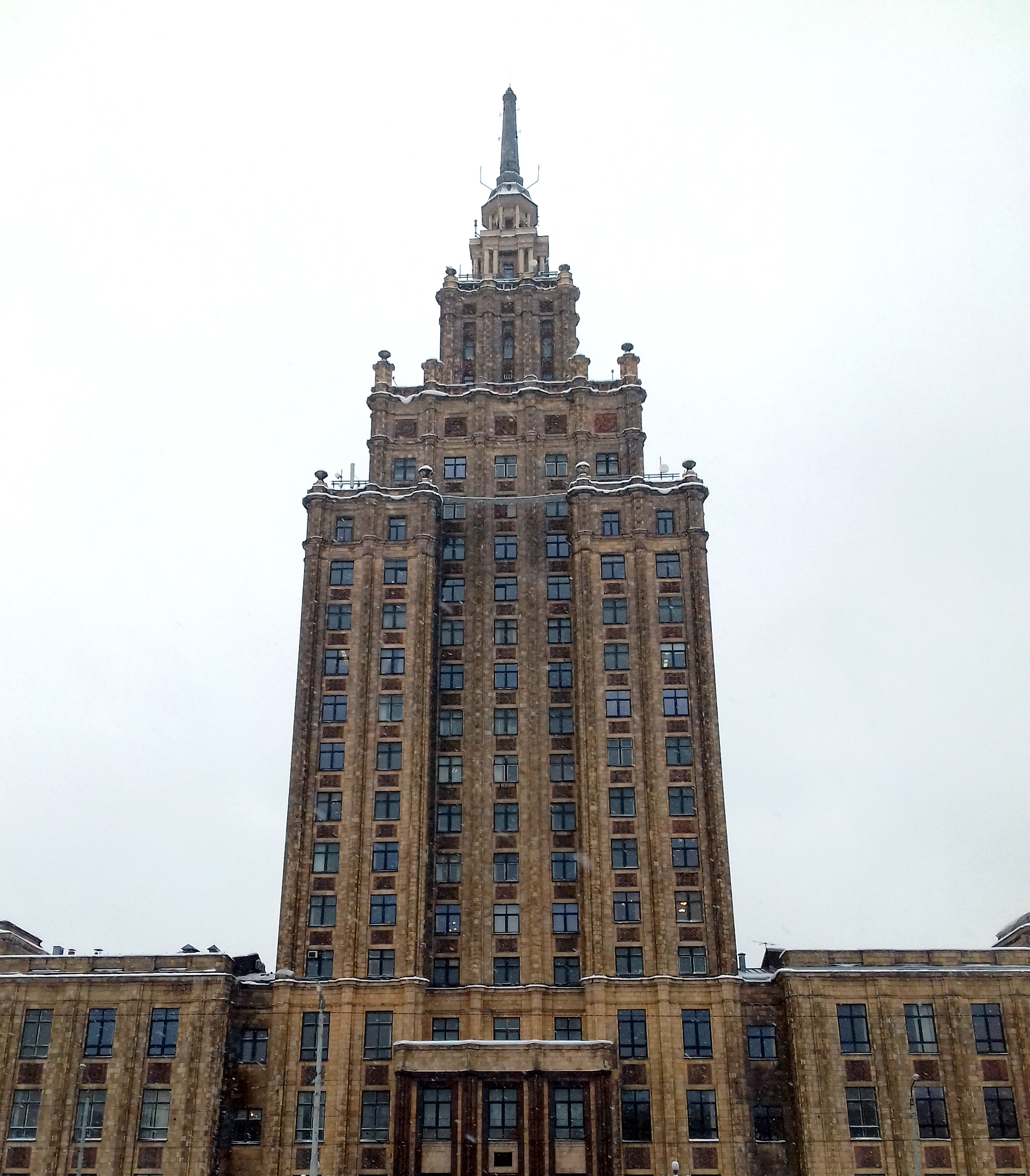
Latvian Academy of Sciences

Initially planned as House of Kolkhoz workers (Kolhoznieku nams), construction was started in 1951 and finished in 1958, although the building was officially opened only in 1961. Upon finishing the building was turned over to the Latvian Academy of Sciences. It has 21 floors and a conference hall that seats 1,000 people.

The 108-meter high Academy is not the tallest building in Riga. Unlike other vysotki, which are based on a steel frame with masonry infill, this is a reinforced concrete structure, the first of its kind in the USSR.

== Related buildings ==
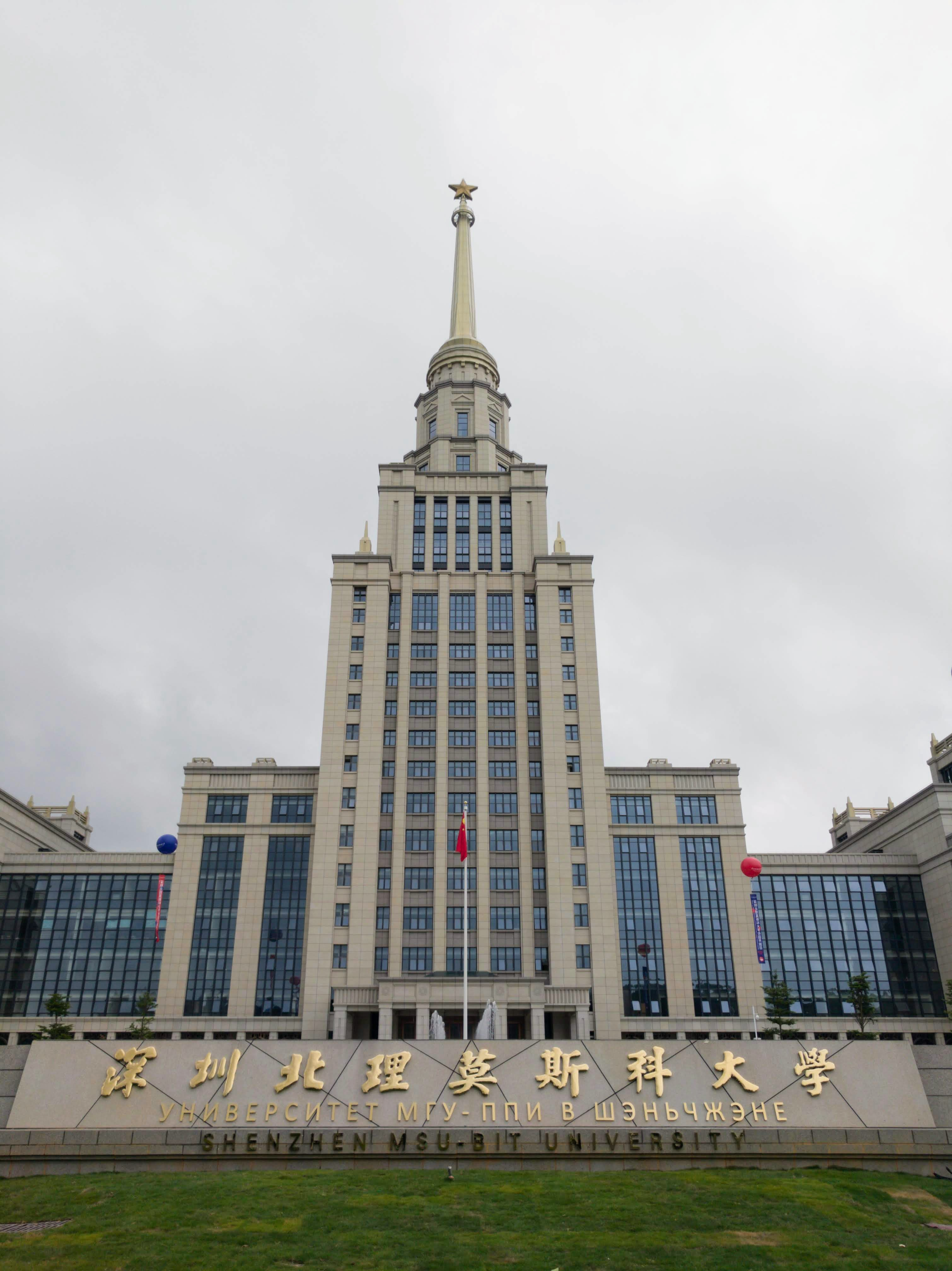
The MSU-BIT University in Shenzhen is stylized as MSU

Many Stalinist buildings have tower crowns, but they do not belong to the vysotki project and their style is completely different. This is evident in Chechulin's Peking Hotel building. Seen from a low point of the Garden Ring south, it could be mistaken for a skyscraper, but if viewed from Triumfalnaya Square it is clear that the building is far less imposing. There are also several smaller Stalinesque towers in Barnaul, St. Petersburg and other cities. Design and construction of such towers became widespread in the early 1950s, although many ongoing projects were cancelled in 1955, when regional "skyscrapers" were specifically addressed by Nikita Khrushchev's decree "On liquidation of architectural excesses..." as unacceptable expense.

=== Triumph Palace, Moscow, 2003 ===
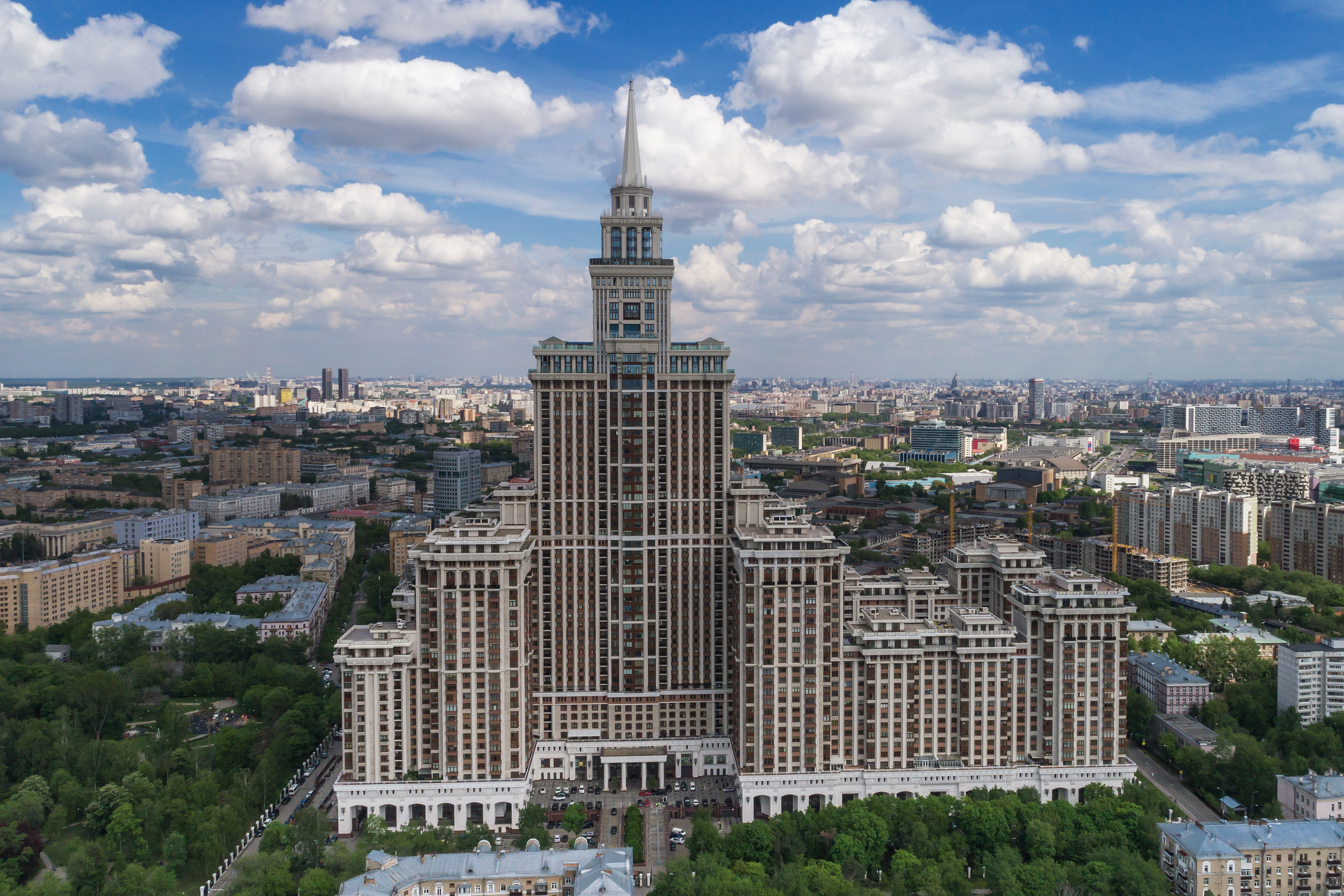
Triumph Palace, Moscow, spring 2017

The high-profile Triumph Palace tower in north-western Moscow (3, Chapayevsky Lane), completed in December 2003, attempts to imitate the vysotki, and actually exceeds the university building in structural height. It is criticized for being placed deeply inside a residential mid-rise area, away from major avenues and squares, where it could be an important visual anchor. A close inspection reveals that this white and red tower has little in common with Stalinist style, except for sheer size and layered tower outline. It competes for the 'Eighth Vysotka' title with an earlier Edelweiss Tower in western Moscow. Construction began in 2001. The 57-story building, containing about 1,000 luxury apartments, was topped out on December 20, 2003, and, at the time, was Europe's tallest building at 264.1 meters or 867 feet.

=== Triumph Astana, 2006 ===
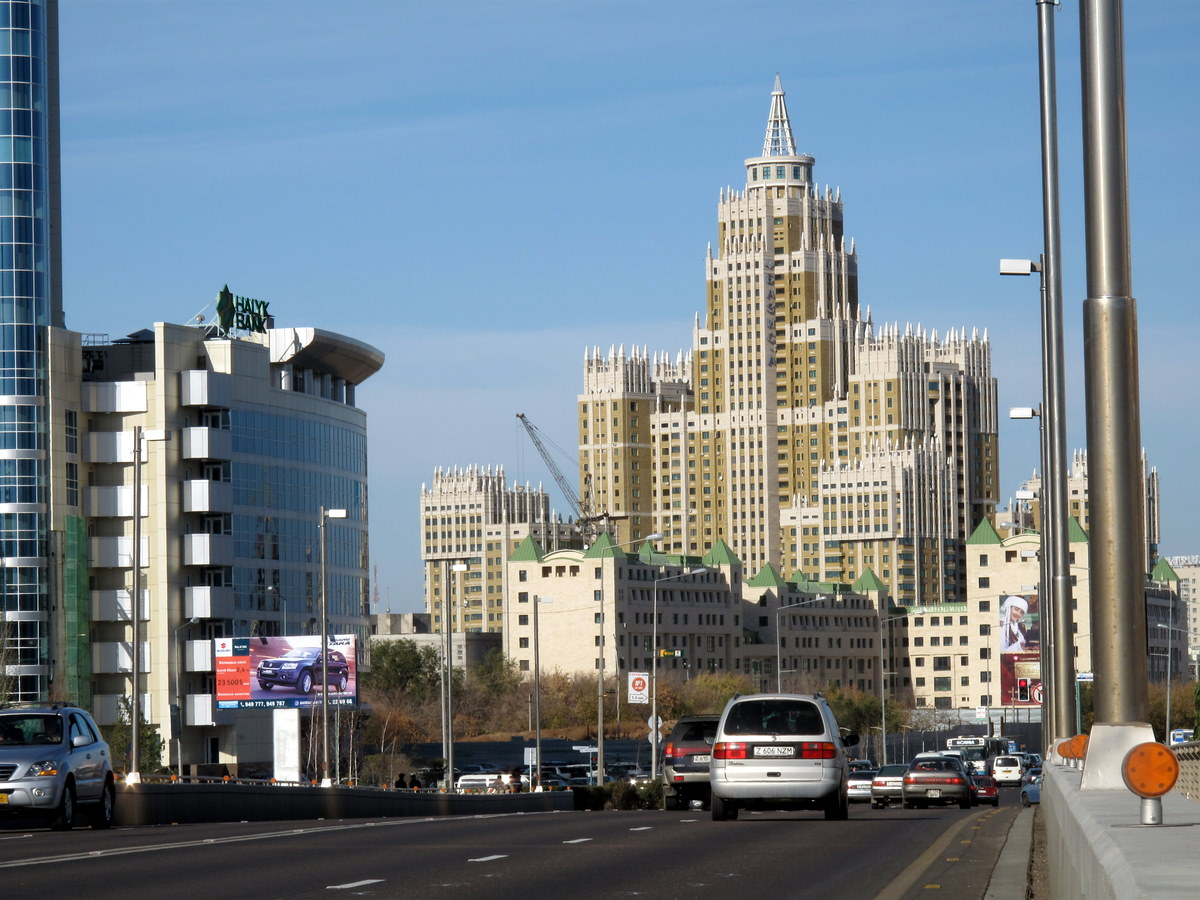
Triumph Astana

The Triumph Tower of Astana is a 142-metre (466 ft), 39-story residential building in the Kazakhstan capital that was completed in 2006. Modeled after 1950s Soviet high-rise buildings, the complex includes a cinema, restaurants, a center of children's development, and a shopping center.
