= Alexey Dushkin =

Soviet architect (1904–1977)

Alexey Nikolayevich Dushkin
- Born: 24 December 1904; Alexandrovka, Kharkov Governorate, Russian Empire
- Died: 8 October 1977 (aged 72); Moscow, Russian SFSR, Soviet Union
- Occupation: Architect
- Awards: Stalin Prize 1946
- Buildings: Moscow Metro stations
- Projects: Palace of Soviets, 1932

Alexey Nikolayevich Dushkin (Russian: Алексей Николаевич Душкин; 24 December 1904 – 8 October 1977) was a Soviet architect, best known for his 1930s designs of the Kropotkinskaya and Mayakovskaya stations of the Moscow Metro. He worked primarily for subway and railroads and is also noted for his Red Gate Building, one of the Seven Sisters.

== Early years (1904-1934) ==
Alexey Dushkin studied chemistry in Kharkiv for three years since 1921, then transferred to architectural college and graduated in 1930. Dushkin worked in city planning, setting up zoning plans for Donbas towns; he co-designed a college building in Kharkiv in 1932. Dushkin associated himself with VOPRA, a left-wing artistic association led by Arkady Mordvinov and Karo Alabyan. In 1932, Dushkin applied for the Palace of Soviets contest. His draft did not win the main prize, but earned an invitation to Moscow to join the Palace design team, and later Ivan Fomin's Workshop No.3.

== Dushkin's Metro (1934-1943) ==
(Note: This section is based on "Moscow Metro. 70 years" (World Architecture Magazine no.14, 2005, see References))

=== Kropotkinskaya (1935) ===
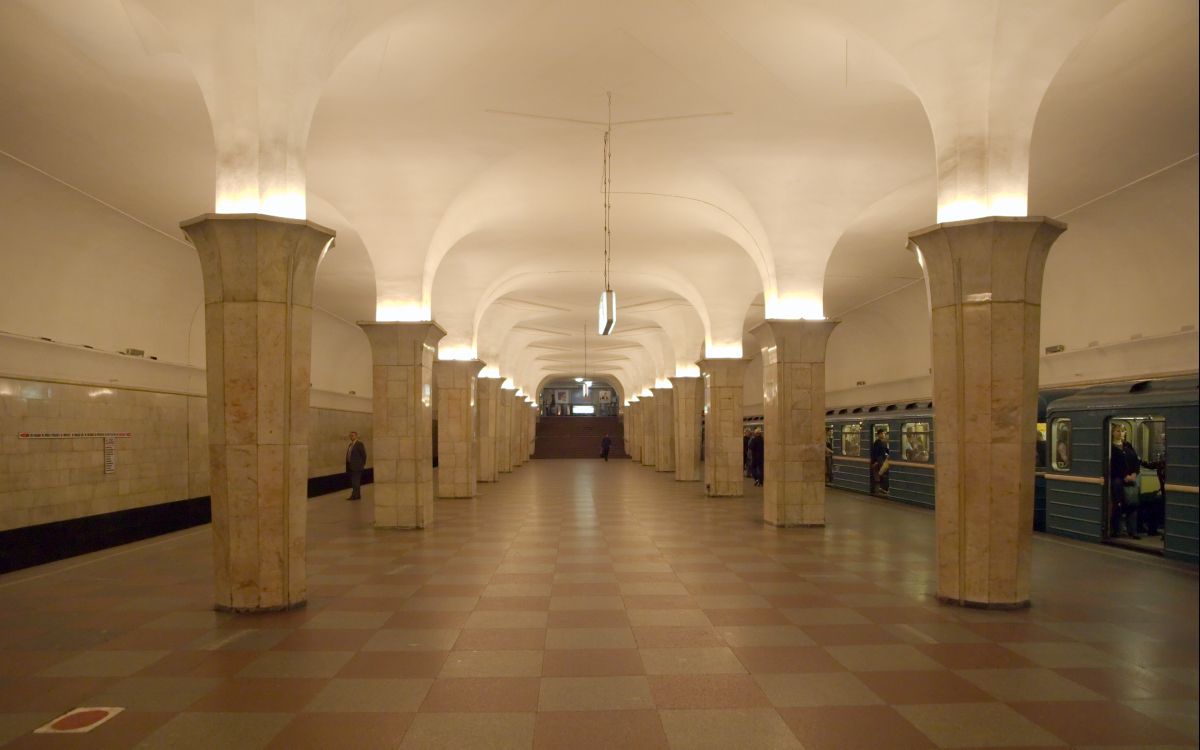
Kropotkinskaya metro station

His greatest chance came with the first stage of Moscow Metro. Dushkin and Yakov Lichtenberg, two junior architects, were awarded the honorable task of designing the Palace of Soviets metro station (now Kropotkinskaya).

The choice of young, unknown architects for the most important station is a mystery. Authors of Moscow Metro. 70 years speculate that Dushkin was spotted by Lazar Kaganovich, project manager for the Metro, during the Palace of Soviets contest, or even earlier, in Kharkiv (when Kaganovich headed Ukrainian branch of the Communist Party).

Basic triple-span, columnar layout was fixed by the Metro master planners. Dushkin worked within this framework and very tight construction schedule (half a year from earth pit to completion). Later, in 1973, he summarized the experience: "Optical illusion is worthless. Under ground, light is the most vital structural element that livens up materials and underscores shapes... My creed is Kropotkinskaya. We referred to the Egyptian subterranean legacy, where column tops were lit by oil lamps. This choice is the best answer for the underground reality". This work earned him a Stalin Prize in 1941 and Grand Prix awards at expositions in Paris (1937) and Brussels (1958).

Trivia: The columns of Kropotkinskaya look like a row of palm trees. In 1935, when the station was opened, its hall was lined up with live palm trees in wooden vats.

=== Ploshchad Revolyutsii (1938) ===
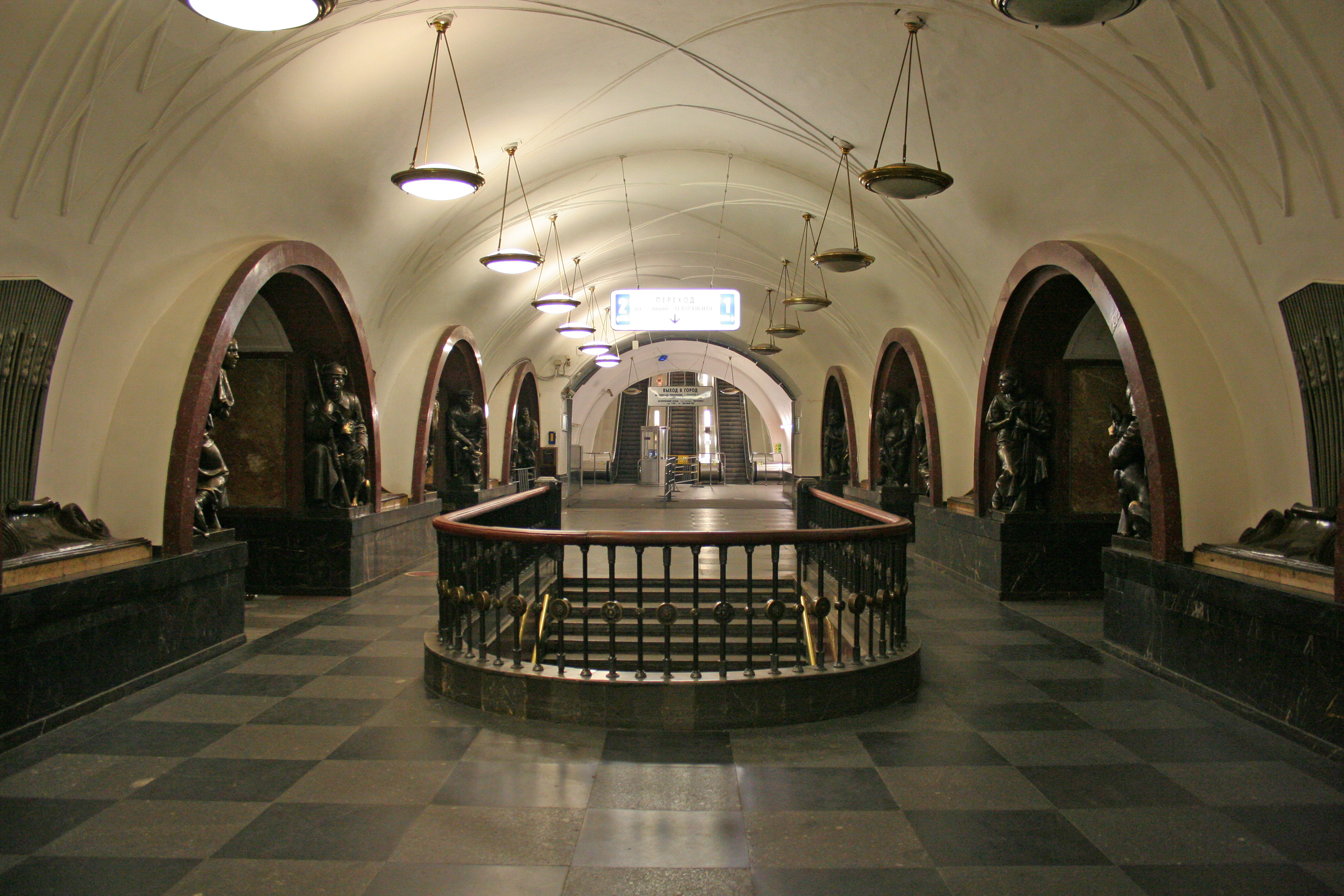
Ploshchad Revolyutsii metro station

This deep alignment station required heavy pylons to support the vaults. In 1930s, architects were obsessed with relieving passengers' anxiety of being underground, so one of the objectives was to make these pylons look slimmer. Dushkin proposed an interesting solution - decorate the pylons with wider arches, filling the gap between the fake and real arch with sculpture. This, he presumed, would narrow the perceived width of pylons.

His original draft called for bas relief sculptures of life-size standing figures on the corners and lace-like Gothic ornaments on the main vault. This, however, did not materialize. Instead, Matvey Manizer, a sculptor with a political backing, preferred classical, larger-than-life bronze sculptures, crouched between fake arches and the plinth. As a result, the station became heavyweight and dark.

=== Mayakovskaya (1938) ===
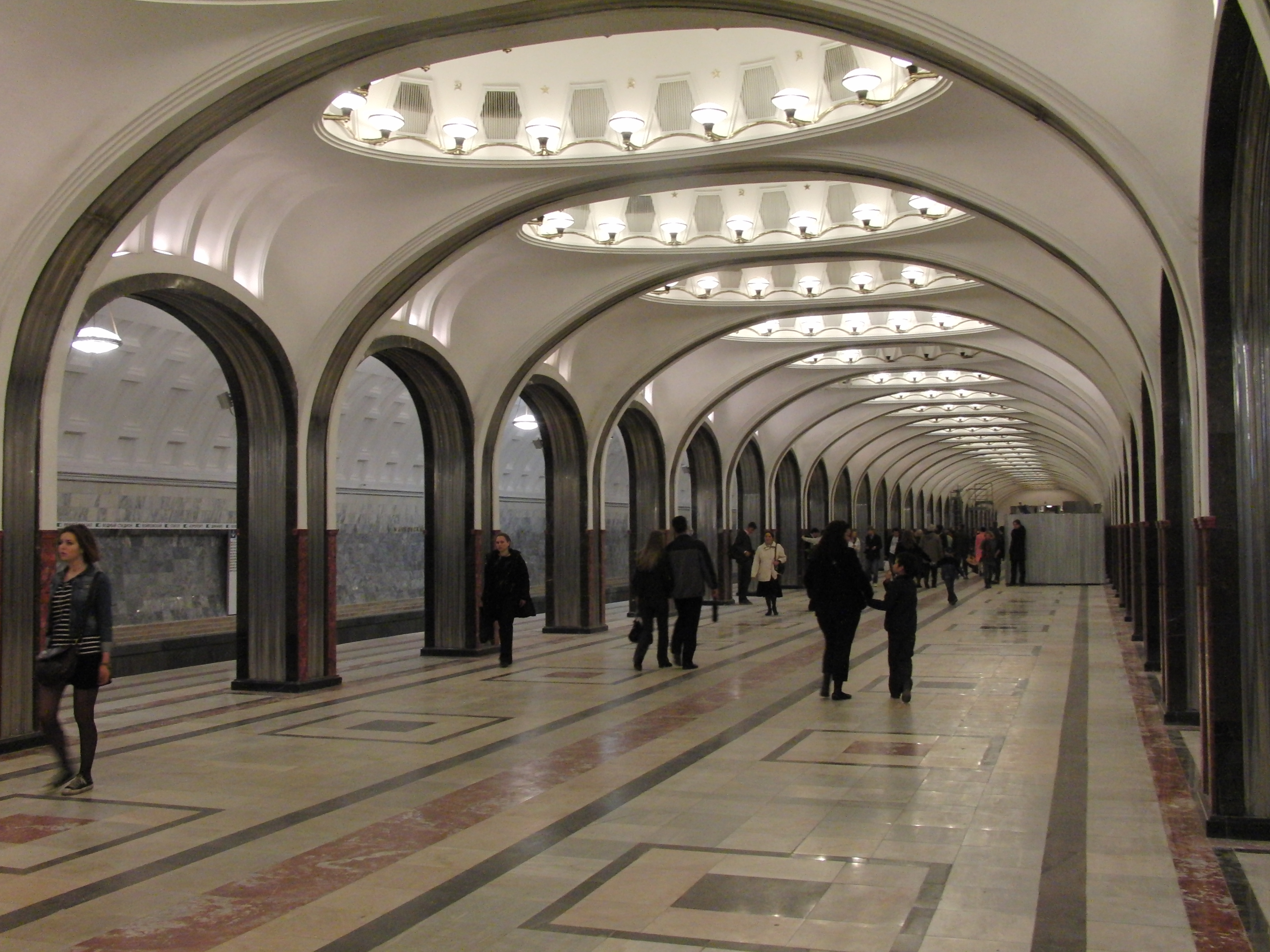
Mayakovskaya metro station

Mayakovskaya, 33 meters under ground, was the first deep alignment station of columnar type (numerous columnar stations of the first stage, including Kropotkinskaya, were shallow alignment type, built by open pit methode).

Dushkin's design, although a Stalinist classic, is within the lines of Art deco. Columns are faced with stainless steel and pink rhodonite, floors and walls are finished in four different shades of granite and marble. 35 (33 visible)) ceiling mosaics by Alexander Deineka "A day in the Soviet Sky". These mosaics are sometimes criticized as being inadequately small for this station and awkwardly placed in recessed soffits. Dushkin recalled later, "Mayakovskaya could have been more impressive. [We] failed to materialize all design plans". Dushkin's wife remembered that when he projected the station in 1936-1937, he asked her to play him Bach or Prokofiev.

The station was awarded Grand Prize of the 1939 New York World's Fair. In 1941, it was used as a bomb shelter. November 6, 1941 it housed the Mossovet meeting were Joseph Stalin delivered his Brothers and Sisters... patriotic speech.

=== Avtozavodskaya (1943) ===
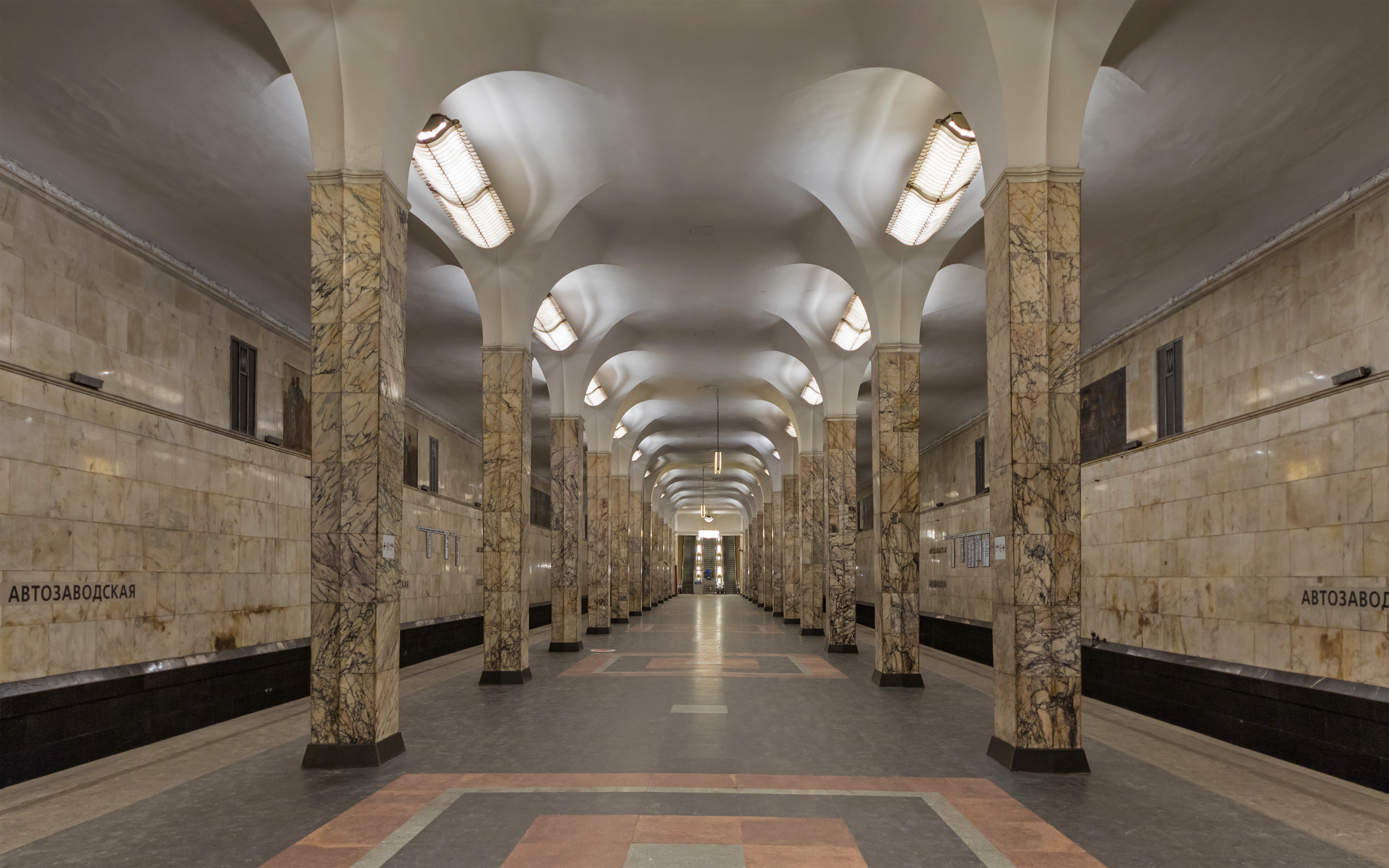
Avtozavodskaya metro station

On January 1, 1943, in the middle of Battle of Stalingrad, Moscow Metro opened a new station, extending the Gorkovsko-Zamoskvoretskaya (now Zamoskvoretskaya) Line from Ploshchad Sverdlova (now Teatralnaya) to Zavod imeni Stalina (now Avtozavodskaya). (Two intermediate stations, Novokuznetskaya and Paveletskaya, were opened on November 20, 1943.) Planners chose Dushkin's simple columnar concept, proven by prewar practice. The columns of Avtozavodskaya are narrower than earlier (and later) examples of this type, giving the station an "airy" feel.

Dushkin expressed his opinion on the project:

"I like this station because it is made with one breath. It clearly manifests the constructive essence and, as with Russian temples, the clearness of the working shape"

As Dushkin's wife revived, the design of the station required considerable creative efforts from the author:

"I remember well how the project of station «ZIS» [Zavod imeni Stalina] was developed. My husband made some drafts, which did not satisfy him, he put off the work and was deep in the book of Timiryazev «Life of plants». He ignored my questions why he needed that and only asked to play Bach's fugue. When finished the book, he sat down at the drawing-board. He made eleven drafts of the station but chose only one, which was realized. For me the character of the station is music and polyphony. While going down by the escalator, the columns appear one by one and then as if combine in common sounding - as the finale of the cadence brought to key"

=== Novoslobodskaya (1952) ===
This station on the Ring Line, 40 meters deep, was Moscow's first employment of stained glass, a technology previously associated with Roman Catholic church and thus deemed unacceptable in Soviet architecture. These glass panes were produced in Latvia to drafts by Pavel Korin. Panels, integrated into white marble pylons, relieve the look of an otherwise heavy structure.

According to Dushkin's wife, the architect proposed stained glass and actually travelled to Riga to inspect Latvian workshops before the war (i.e. between August, 1940 and June, 1941). These plans materialized a decade later.

According to Alexander Strelkov, junior architect on this project, Dushkin originally settled for uranium glass, as he once saw in London, and picked Vera Mukhina to shape the glass. However, Gosplan management rejected his request for uranium, saying "you'd have better chances asking for gold, don't even dream of uranium". Dushkin and Strelkov followed the advice, requested and secured real gold for Pavel Korin's artwork.

== Architect of the Railways (1943-1955) ==
In 1943-1955 Dushkin dedicated himself to mainline railroads and chaired the Architectural Department and Workshop of Ministry of Railways. Dushkin and his workshop designed railway stations to replace the war losses; unlike Mayakovskaya, these are true examples of heavyweight Stalinist architecture.

In 1947, Dushkin received a highest credit, second class - the right to design one of Stalin's Seven sisters. Second class, because the original 8 drafts were pre-arranged into four major and four minor projects; Dushkin qualified for a minor one. He earned Stalin Prize for a conceptual draft in 1949 (with Boris Mezentsev) and completed the tower in 1951. Construction was complicated by the need for a tunnel connection to Krasniye Vorota metro station, and required ingenious cryo technology for drilling the tunnels and levelling the foundation slab. It is not surprising that later the building housed the Ministry of Railways. He returned to Metro once, for Novoslobodskaya.

In November 1955, Dushkin's railroad terminals became a lightning rod of Nikita Khrushchev's famous decree "On liquidation of excesses in construction...", which spelled the end of Stalinist architecture. Khrushchev asserted that costs and volume of these buildings were inflated three times above reasonable estimates. Work of Dushkin's junior architects was ostracized too. Dushkin lost his chair of Chief Railway Architect. He remained a professor at Moscow Architectural Institute until 1974, but had not built anything significant since 1955.

His granddaughter, Natalya Dushkina, is an architect and a vocal preservation advocate.

== Buildings ==
- 1932 Automobile and Road College, Kharkiv
- 1935 Kropotkinskaya station, Moscow Metro
- 1938 Ploshchad Revolyutsii station, Moscow Metro
- 1938 Mayakovskaya station, Moscow Metro
- 1943 Avtozavodskaya station, Moscow Metro
- 1947–1953 Red Gate Building (Ministry of rail transport), Moscow
- 1949 Railway terminal, Simferopol
- 1950 Railway terminal, Dnipropetrovsk (now Dnipro)
- 1951 Railway terminal, Sochi
- 1952 Novoslobodskaya station, Moscow Metro
- 1953 Railway terminal, Yevpatoria
- 1953–1957 Detsky Mir department store, Moscow

== Awards ==
- Three Stalin Prizes second degree (1941, 1946, 1949)

== See also ==
- List of Russian architects
- List of Russian inventors

== Literature ==
- Berkovich, Gary. Reclaiming a History. Jewish Architects in Imperial Russia and the USSR. Volume 2. Soviet Avant-garde: 1917–1933. Weimar und Rostock: Grunberg Verlag. 2021. P. 161. ISBN 978-3-933713-63-6
