= List of tallest educational buildings =

This is a list of the tallest buildings in the world used primarily for education, defined as having an occupier height that is 90% devoted to classroom, research, and educational administration use. It excludes dormitories.

== List ==
| # | Building | School | City | Country | Height (m) | Height (ft) | Floors | Year | District | Notes | Source |
|---|---|---|---|---|---|---|---|---|---|---|---|
| 1 | Main Building | Lomonosov Moscow State University | Moscow | Russia | 240 m | 787 ft | 36 | 1953 | Ramenki | The tallest educational-use building in the world. | |
| 2 | Mode Gakuen Cocoon Tower | Multiple | Tokyo | Japan | 204 m | 668 ft | 50 | 2008 | Nishi-Shinjuku | 17th-tallest Tokyo building in 2008. | |
| 3 | Caleido | IE University | Madrid | Spain | 180 m | 590 ft | 36 | 2021 | Fuencarral-El Pardo | New main building for students at IE University studying for a baccalaureate degree. | |
| 4 | Mode Gakuen Spiral Towers | Multiple | Nagoya | Japan | 170 m | 558 ft | 36 | 2008 | Nakamura-ku | Home to three vocational schools. | |
| 5 | Cathedral of Learning | University of Pittsburgh | Pittsburgh | United States | 163 m | 535 ft | 42 | 1926–1937 | Oakland | This Gothic Revival tower was the world's first educational skyscraper and is home to the Nationality Rooms. | |
| 6 | Cathedral of Learning | Assumption University of Thailand | Bangkok | Thailand | 159 m | 522 ft | 39 | 2002 | Suvarnabhumi | The eclectic design typifies the traditional Thai veneration of knowledge and learning. | |
| 7 | Wabash Building | Roosevelt University | Chicago | United States | 143m | 469 ft | 32 | 2012 | South Loop | The Wabash Building is the second-tallest higher-education building in the United States and the sixth tallest in the world. | |
| 8 | Guang Hua Tower | Fudan University | Shanghai | China | 142m | 465 ft | 30 | 2005 | Yangpu | The tallest educational-use building in China. | |
| 9 | Zhixin Building (Block A) | Shandong University | Jinan | China | 139.1m | 456 ft | 27 | 2010 | Licheng | With a 30m-tall bell tower. 136.2m is the original design height. | |
| 10 | Shinjuku Building | Kogakuin University | Tokyo | Japan | 133 m | 436 ft | 29 | 1989 | Nishi-Shinjuku | | |
| 11 | STEC Information Building | Kogakuin University | Tokyo | Japan | 124 m | 405 ft | 28 | 1992 | Nishi-Shinjuku | | |
| 12 | Boissonade Tower | Hosei University | Tokyo | Japan | 122 m | 400 ft | 27 | 2000 | Chiyoda | Named after Gustave Emile Boissonade | |
| =13 | Academy of Sciences Headquarters | Russian Academy of Sciences | Moscow | Russia | 120 m | 394 ft | 29 | 1989 | Gagarinsky District | | |
| =13 | UTS Tower | University of Technology, Sydney | Sydney | Australia | 120 m | 394 ft | 33 | 1978 | City of Sydney | Bordered by Broadway. The 60th-tallest building in Sydney. | |
| =15 | Peter Gilgan Centre for Research and Learning | University of Toronto | Toronto | Canada | 119 m | 390 ft | 21 | 2013 | | | |
| =15 | Liberty Tower | Meiji University | Tokyo | Japan | 119 m | 390 ft | 23 | 1998 | | | |
| 17 | Torre de la Universidad Laboral | Universidad Laboral de Gijón | Gijón | Spain | 117 m | 384 ft | 17 | 1956 | | | |
| 18 | 25 Park Place | Georgia State University | Atlanta | United States | 115 m | 377 ft | 28 | 1978 | | | |
| 19 | Erasmus MC Faculteitsgebouw | Erasmus MC | Rotterdam | Netherlands | 114 m | 374 ft | 27 | 1969 | Centrum | Faculty building. | |
| 20 | ASEEC Tower | Airlangga University | Surabaya | Indonesia | 112 m | 367 | 20 | 2022 | Gubeng | Mixed-Uses University building. | |
| 21 | Rhodes Tower | Cleveland State University | Cleveland | United States | 111 m | 363 ft | 20 | 1971 | St. Vincent Quadrangle, Downtown | | |
| 22 | Academy of Sciences | Latvian Academy of Sciences | Riga | Latvia | 108 m | 353 ft | 21 | 1955 | | | |
| 23 | University Hall | University of Illinois at Chicago | Chicago | United States | 103 m | 338 ft | 28 | 1965 | Near West Side | Designed in Brutalist style by Walter Netsch. Constructed by Skidmore, Owings and Merrill. The south portion of the 2nd floor can be seen near the end of the 2006 film Stranger Than Fiction. | |
| =24 | Eshkol Tower | University of Haifa | Haifa | Israel | 102 m | 335 ft | 30 | 1978 | | | |
| =24 | Osaka Mode Gaen | Osaka Mode Gakuen | Osaka | Japan | 102 m | 335 ft | 21 | 1999 | | | |
| =26 | UNIP Paraíso/Vergueiro | Paulista University | São Paulo | Brazil | 100 m | 328 ft | 25 | | Aclimação | The building has a 123 m broadcast tower on top of it. | |
| =26 | BRAC University UB02 | BRAC University | Dhaka | Bangladesh | 100 m | 328 ft | 20 | 2012 | Dhaka, Bangladesh | 66. Mohakhali. | |
| 28 | UW Tower | University of Washington | Seattle | United States | 99 m | 325 ft | 22 | 1975 | | Administration Building, designed by NBBJ. | |
| 28 | Pinisi Tower | State University of Makassar | Makassar | Indonesia | 97.5 m | 320 ft | 17 | 2012 | | | |
| 29 | Main Building (the Tower) | University of Texas at Austin | Austin | United States | 94 m | 307 ft | 29 | 1937 | | | |
| 30 | Duan Family Center for Computing & Data Sciences | Boston University | Boston | United States | 93 m | 305 ft | 19 | 2022 | Back Bay, Boston | | |
| 31 | Bunka Gakuen main building | Bunka Fashion College & Bunka Gakuen University | Tokyo | Japan | 92 m | 302 ft | 20 | 1999 | Shibuya | | |
| 32 | 181 Mercer Street | New York University | New York City | United States | 91 m | 299 ft | 23 | 2021 | Greenwich Village | | |
| =33 | Br. Andrew Gonzalez Hall | De La Salle University | Manila | Philippines | 90 m | 297 ft | 21 | 2006 | Taft Avenue | | |
| =33 | W. E. B. Du Bois Library | University of Massachusetts Amherst | Amherst | United States | 90 m | 297 ft | 26 | 1974 | | Tallest library in the United States | |
| =33 | Tour Jussieu | University of Paris (Pierre and Marie Curie University, Paris Diderot University); Institut de Physique du Globe de Paris | Paris | France | 90 m | 295 ft | 27 | 1971 | | Part of the Jussieu Campus. Administration building. | |
| =33 | TU Delft faculteit ITS | Delft University of Technology | Delft | Netherlands | 90 m | 295 ft | 23 | 1969 | | | |
| =33 | Green Building | Massachusetts Institute of Technology | Cambridge | United States | 90 m | 295 ft | 21 | 1964 | | Designed by I. M. Pei, named after Cecil Howard Green | |
| =38 | Erasmusgebouw | Radboud University Nijmegen | Nijmegen | Netherlands | 88 m | 289 ft | 21 | 1973 | | | |
| =38 | Semmelweis University | Semmelweis University | Budapest | Hungary | 88 m | 289 ft | 23 | 1976 | Józsefváros | | |
| =38 | 1440 Canal | Tulane University | New Orleans | United States | 88 m | 288 ft | 21 | 1972 | Central Business District | Also known as the Tidewater Building and Tidewater Place. Home to Tulane University Health Sciences Center administrative offices and Tulane University School of Public Health and Tropical Medicine. WWOZ has its antenna and transmitter atop the building | |
| =41 | University of Belgrano campus | University of Belgrano | Buenos Aires | Argentina | 86 m | 282 ft | 22 | | Belgrano | | |
| =41 | Faculties of health sciences | University of Buenos Aires | Buenos Aires | Argentina | 86 m | 282 ft | 19 | 1944 | Recoleta | | |
| =41 | South Ural State University | South Ural State University | Chelyabinsk | Russia | 86 m | 282 ft | 18 | 1959 | Tsentralny | | |
| =44 | Rajabai Clock Tower | University of Mumbai | Mumbai | India | 85 m | 280 ft | 28 | 1878 | Fort | | |
| =44 | Geomatikum | University of Hamburg | Hamburg | Germany | 85 m | 279 ft | 20 | 1975 | Rotherbaum | | |
| 46 | Loyola University Tower | Loyola University Chicago | Chicago | United States | 84 m | 275 ft | 16 | 1994 | | | |
| 47 | Moos Health Sciences Tower | University of Minnesota | Minneapolis | United States | 82 m | 268 ft | 17 | 1974 | | | |
| =48 | Fenn Tower | Cleveland State University | Cleveland | United States | 81 m | 266 ft | 22 | 1929 | | | |
| =48 | Law Tower | Boston University | Boston | United States | 81 m | 265 ft | 17 | 1964 | Fenway-Kenmore | The tallest law school building in America, located at 765 Commonwealth Avenue, site of Boston University School of Law. | |
| =48 | Akademia Ekonomiczna | Poznań University of Economics | Poznań | Poland | 81 m | 264 ft | 19 | 1991 | | | |
| =51 | Victoria University | Victoria University | Melbourne | Australia | 80 m | 262 ft | 20 | | City of Melbourne | On Flinders Street | |
| =51 | 33 West 42nd Street | State University of New York State College of Optometry | New York City | United States | 80 m | 262 ft | 18 | 1931 | Midtown Manhattan | Opposite Bryant Park and the New York Public Library Main Branch; the college's only building, including all classrooms, laboratories, library, research space and patient clinics | |
| 53 | Telefunken Haus | Technische Universität Berlin, | Berlin | Germany | 79 m | 259 ft | 22 | 1961 | Charlottenburg | Nearby Ernst-Reuter-Platz | |
| =54 | 23rd Street Building | Baruch College | New York City | United States | 78 m | 257 ft | 16 | 1930 | Flatiron District, Manhattan | | |
| =54 | Erasmus Universiteit Gebouw H | Erasmus University Rotterdam | Rotterdam | Netherlands | 78 m | 256 ft | 20 | 1970 | | | |
| =54 | Heinz Memorial Chapel | University of Pittsburgh | Pittsburgh | United States | 78 m | 256 ft | 1 | 1933–1938 | Oakland | French Gothic Revival university chapel | |
| =54 | Slovak University of Technology in Bratislava | Slovak University of Technology in Bratislava | Bratislava | Slovakia | 78 m | 256 ft | 24 | | | | |
| =54 | Arts Tower | University of Sheffield | Sheffield | United Kingdom | 78 m | 256 ft | 20 | 1965 | | | |
| 59 | Dunton Tower | Carleton University | Ottawa | Canada | 77 m | 253 ft | 22 | 1974 | | | |
| =60 | Kline Biology Tower | Yale University | New Haven | United States | 76 m | 250 ft | 16 | 1966 | | Designed by Philip Johnson | |
| =60 | Patterson Office Tower | University of Kentucky | Lexington | United States | 76 m | 250 ft | 20 | 1968 | | | |
| =60 | Tower 75 | Meijo University | Nagoya | Japan | 76 m | 249 ft | 16 | 2002 | Tempaku-ku | | |
| =60 | New Medical Tower | Tokyo Medical and Dental University | Tokyo | Japan | 76 m | 249 ft | 17 | 1996 | | | |
| =60 | Lurie Medical Research Building | Northwestern University | Chicago | United States | 76 m | 248 ft | 13 | 2005 | | | |
| =65 | Van Hise Hall | University of Wisconsin–Madison | Madison | United States | 73 m | 241 ft | 19 | 1967 | | On 1220 Linden Drive. Slated for destruction sometime after 2035 under the university's master plan. Named for former university president Charles R. Van Hise. | |
| =65 | "The Tower" | John Jay College of Criminal Justice | New York City | United States | 73 m | 240 ft | 14 | 2012 | | | |
| 67 | Golden Jubilee Building | National Institute of Technology Rourkela | Rourkela | India | 72 m | 236 ft | 14 | 2020 | Sundergarh | Tallest educational building in India and one of the tallest educational buildings in the whole of South-East Asia | |
| 68 | Belfer Hall | Yeshiva University | New York City | United States | 71.6 m | 235 ft | 18 | 1969 | Washington Heights, Manhattan | Because of its location in the Heights, it is the highest roof point based on elevation in NYC | |
| 69 | Northwest Corner Building | Columbia University | New York City | United States | 70 m | 229 ft | 14 | 2010 | | | |
| 70 | Roy and Diana Vagelos Education Center | Columbia University | New York City | United States | 67 m | 220 ft | 14 | 2016 | | | |
| 71 | h_da-Hochhaus | Darmstadt University of Applied Sciences | Darmstadt | Germany | 66 m | 218 ft | 16 | 1965 | Darmstadt-West | Tallest building in Darmstadt. The building was extended and renovated in 2011. | |
| =72 | Carlos Morel Municipal School of Fine Arts | Carlos Morel Municipal School of Fine Arts | Quilmes | Argentina | 65 m | 213 ft | 15 | 1962 | | It was originally built as the municipal building (city hall). | |
| =72 | U-1 ("У-1") building | Kharkiv Polytechnic Institute | Kharkiv | Ukraine | 65 m | 213 ft | 14 | 1974 | | Hosting several faculties, departments and many general-purpose auditoriums. Equipped with high-speed elevators. | |
| 74 | Senate House | University of London | London | United Kingdom | 64 m | 210 ft | 19 | 1937 | Bloomsbury | | |
| 75 | Main Building (University of Notre Dame) | University of Notre Dame | Notre Dame | United States | 57 m | 187 ft | 7 | 1879 | | | |
| =76 | Líceum (Building A) | Eszterházy Károly University | Eger | Hungary | 54 m | 177 ft | 10 | 1765-1785 | Heves | In the east side of the building is the observatory tower with a camera obscura on the 10th floor. In the building was a real observatorium, what is now museum. | |
| =76 | Jesse Hall | University of Missouri | Columbia, Missouri | United States | 54 m | 177 ft | 8 | 1894 | Downtown Columbia | Tallest building in Columbia. South wall of Francis Quadrangle. | |
| 78 | James Hight Building | University of Canterbury | Christchurch, New Zealand | New Zealand | 53 m | 175 ft | 11 | 1974 | | | |

=== Unknown height ===
| Building | School | City | Country | Floors | Year | Notes | Source |
|---|---|---|---|---|---|---|---|
| Binus University – Alam Sutera Campus | Bina Nusantara University | Tangerang | Indonesia | 22 | 2014 | | |
| HKU SPACE Po Leung Kuk Community College Building | HKU SPACE Po Leung Kuk Community College | Hong Kong | China | 19 | | | |
| B Block (Elements) | PES University | Bengaluru | India | 14 | 2017 | | |

== Under construction ==
| # | Building | City | Country | Height (m) | Height (ft) | Floors | Year | District | Notes | Source |
| 1 | DY. Patil Collage of Medicine | Kolhapur | India | 100 Meter | 328 Feet | 22 | 2028 | | | |
