= Lev Rudnev =

Soviet architect

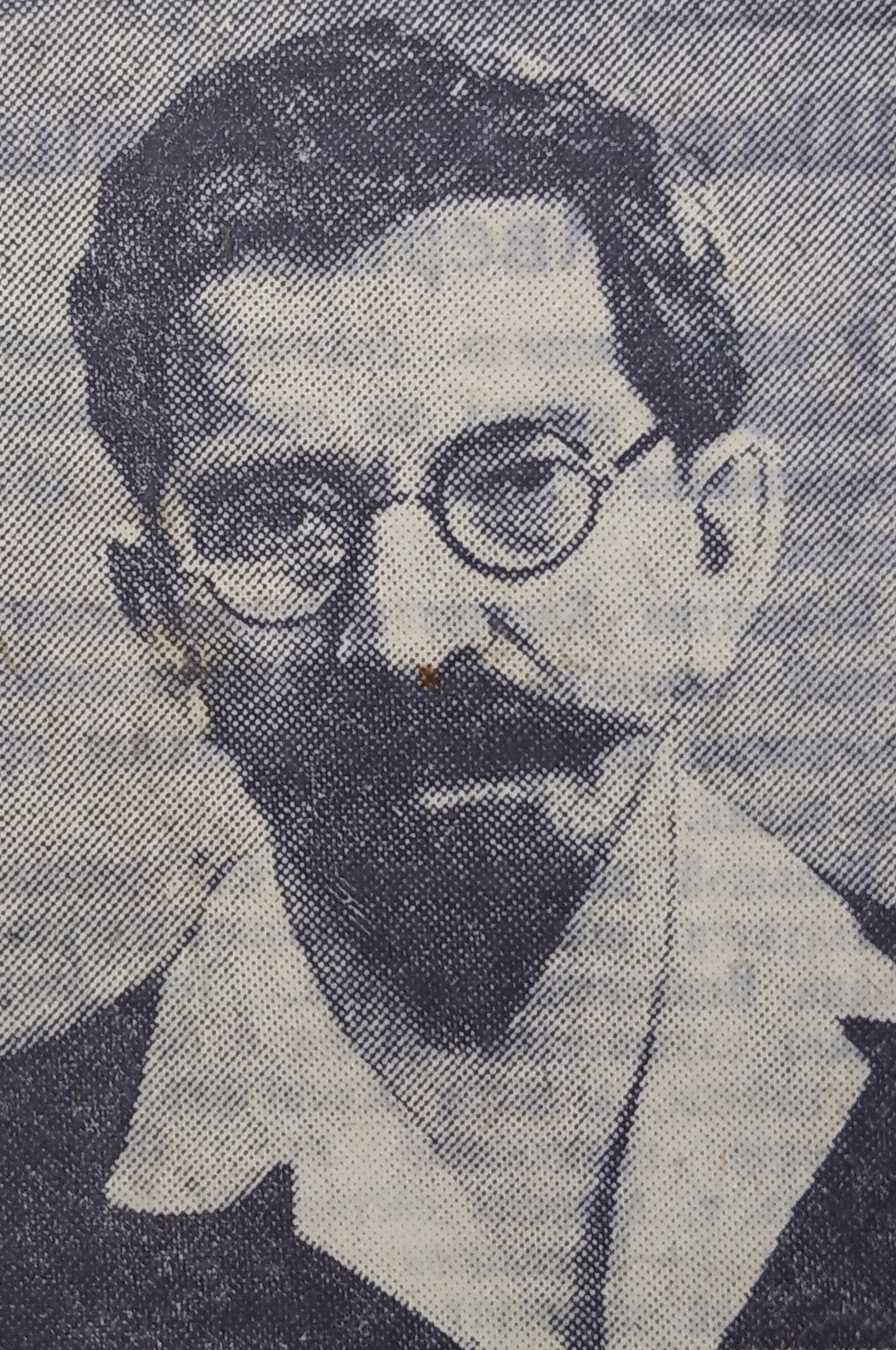
- Born: 13 March 1885; Novgorod, Russian Empire
- Died: 19 November 1956 (aged 71); Moscow, Russian SFSR, Soviet Union
- Education: Imperial Academy of Arts in Saint Petersburg
- Occupation: Architect
- Buildings: Palace of Culture and Science; Moscow State University

Lev Vladimirovich Rudnev (Russian: Лев Владимирович Ру́днев; 13 March [O.S. 1 March] 1885 – 19 November 1956) was a Soviet architect, and a leading practitioner of Stalinist architecture.

== Biography ==
Rudnev was born to the family of a school teacher in Novgorod. He graduated from the Riga Realschule (now the Riga 1st State Grammar School) and entered the Imperial Academy of Arts in Saint Petersburg (1906). At the Academy he studied painting under Leon Benois and architecture under Ivan Fomin. From 1911 Rudnev was a success in various architectural competitions, and in 1915 he became a certified specialist in the art of architecture.

After the February Revolution Rudnev won the competition for the Monument to the Fighters of the Revolution on the Field of Mars in Petrograd (March 1917). The avant-garde monument there was built according to his design.

After the end of the Second World War, Lev Rudnev took active part in reconstructing the ruined cities of Voronezh, Stalingrad, Riga and Moscow. In 1922–1948 Rudnev was a professor at the Academy of Arts (former Imperial Academy of Arts) in Leningrad; in 1948–1952 he was a professor at the Moscow Architectural Institute. Rudnev was also a member of Academy of Architecture of the USSR.

Rudnev's most remarkable architectural work is the ensemble of the Lomonosov Moscow State University on Sparrow Hills, then known as Lenin Hills (1948–1953, co-designed with S. Chernyshyov, P. Abrosimov, A. Khryakov, and engineer V. Nasonov). His Palace of Culture and Science in Warsaw, Poland (1952–1955) resembles the markedly sculptural style of the MSU ensemble.

== Projects ==
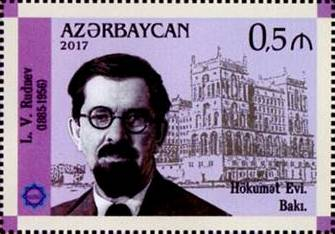
Stamps of Azerbaijan, 2017

He was the author of many large scale Soviet projects, including:

- M. V. Frunze Military Academy in Moscow (1939)
- Administrative building on Shaposhnikov street (1934–1938)
- Administrative building on Frunze embankment (1938–1955)
- Main building of Moscow State University (1949–1953). This is probably the best known of his buildings, for which he was awarded the Stalin Prize in 1949
- House of the Government of the Azerbaijan Soviet Socialist Republic in Baku (finished in 1952)
- Palace of Culture and Science in Warsaw, Poland (1952–1955)
- Buildings of Latvian Academy of Sciences in Riga (1953–1956)

== Gallery ==
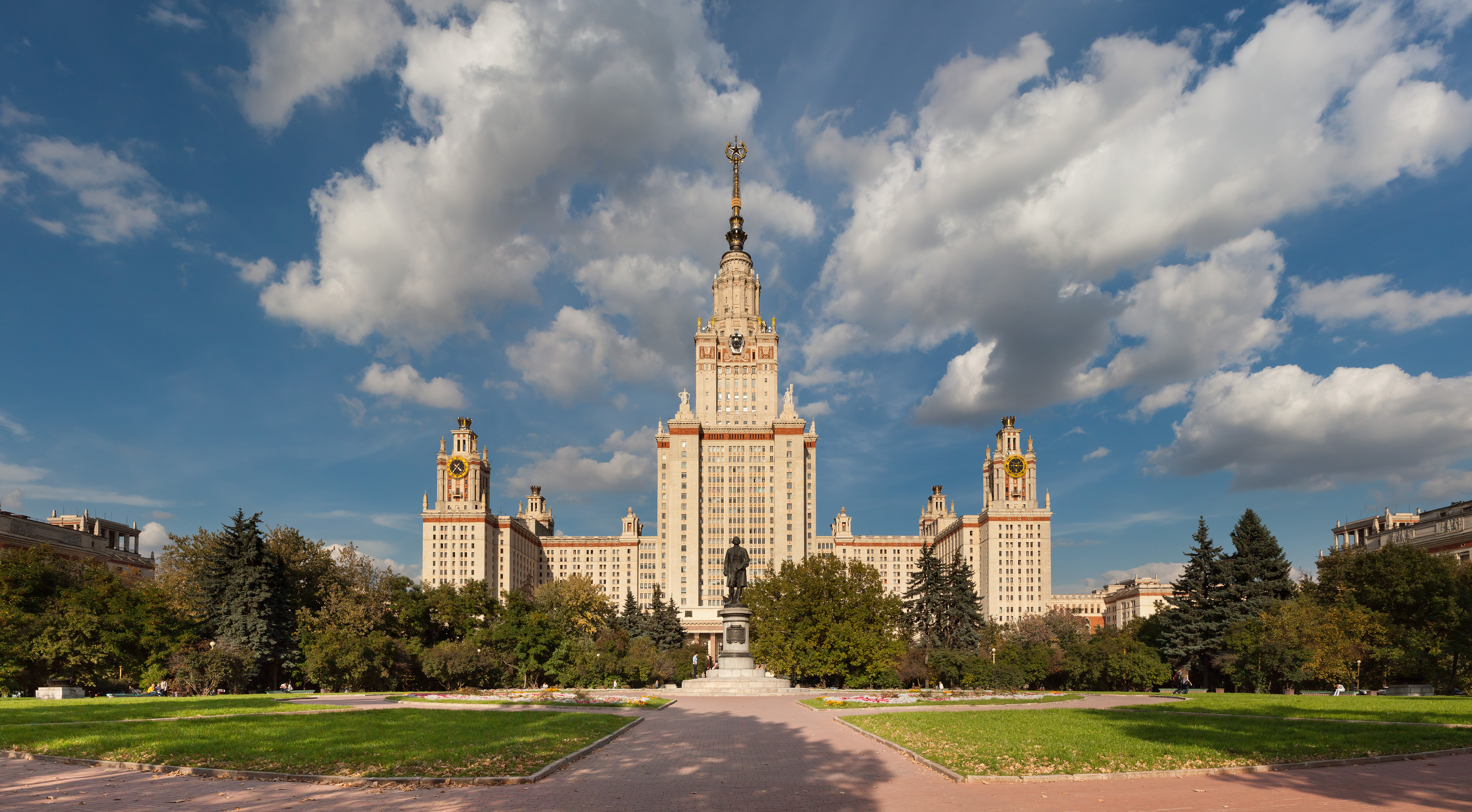
The main building of Moscow State University

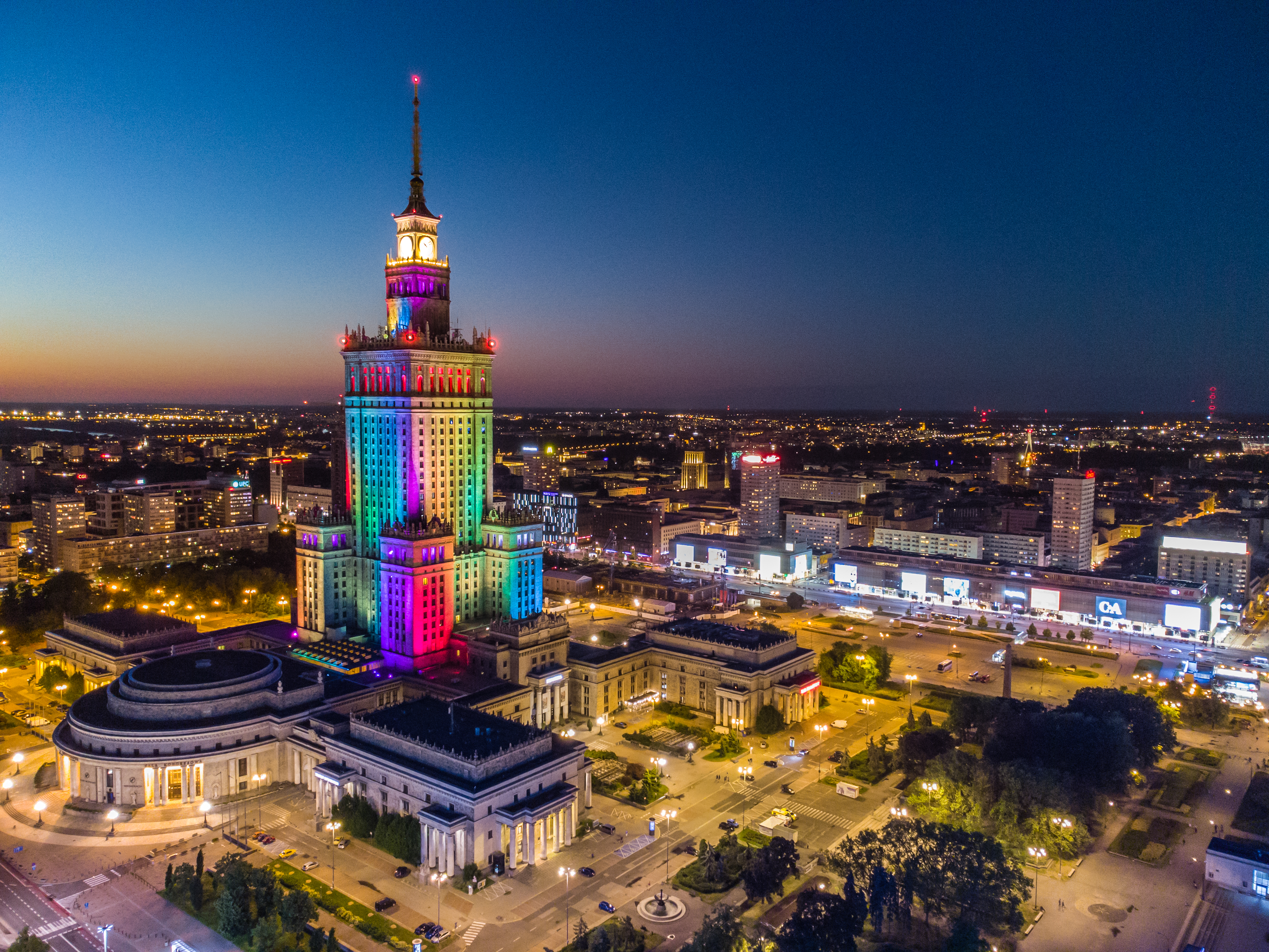
Palace of Culture and Science
