= Main building of Moscow State University =

University building in Moscow

- Главное здание МГУ
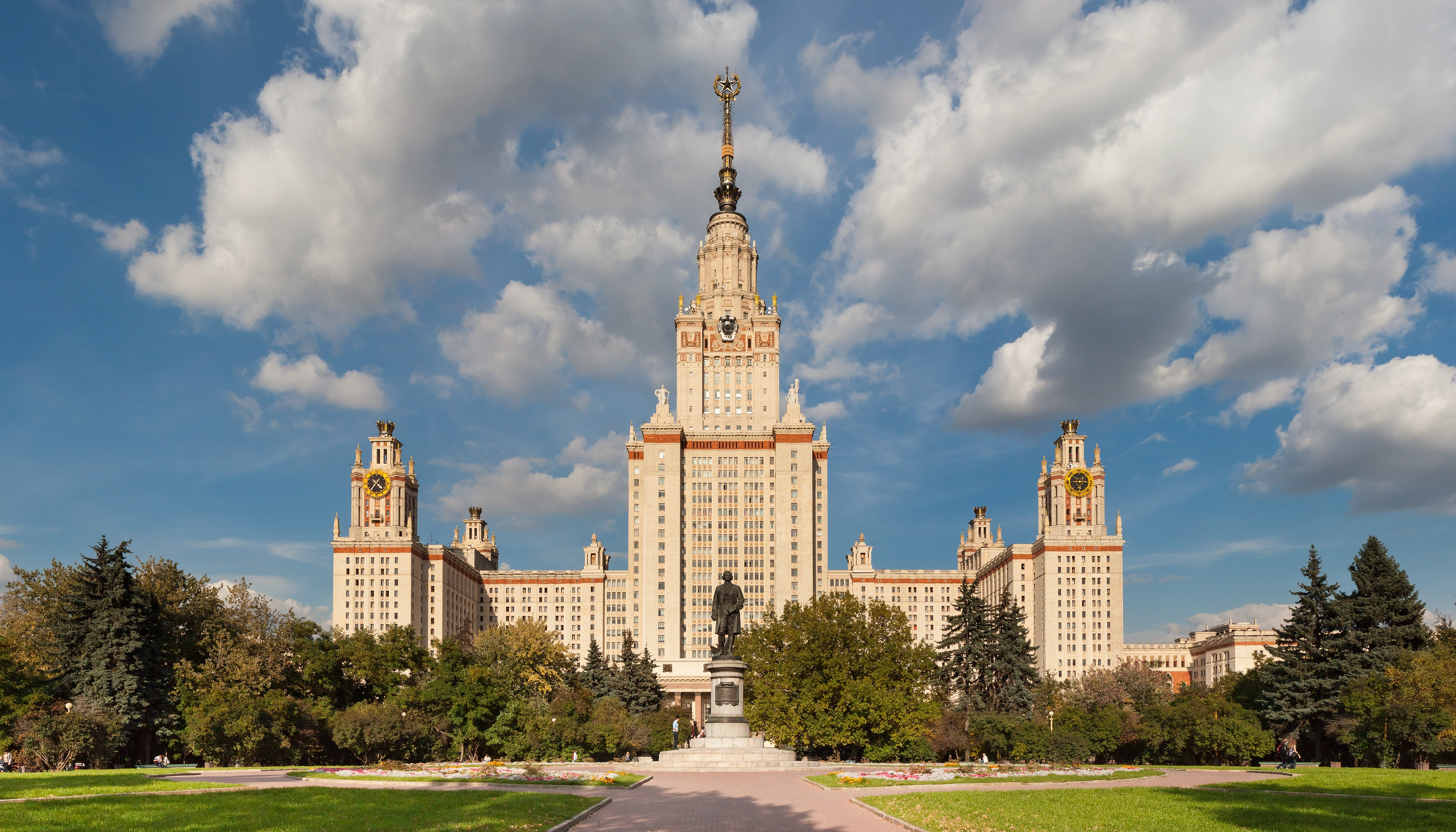
- Interactive map of the Main building of Moscow State University area

General information
- Status: in use
- Type: Educational
- Architectural style: Stalinist
- Location: 1 Leninskie Gory, Moscow, Russia
- Coordinates: 55°42′11″N 37°31′49″E
- Construction started: 1949
- Completed: 1953
- Opening: 1953-09-01
- Operator: Moscow State University

Height
- Antenna spire: 239 m (784 ft)
- Roof: 182 m (597 ft)

Technical details
- Floor count: 36

Design and construction
- Architect: Lev Rudnev
- Structural engineer: Vsevolod Nikolaevich Nasonov

The main building of Moscow State University (Russian: главное здание МГУ, romanized: glavnoe zdanie MGU) is a 239-metre (784 ft), 36-story (central part) skyscraper in Moscow, Russia. It was designed by Lev Rudnev as the headquarters of Moscow State University, and is the tallest among the "Seven Sisters" constructed in Moscow between 1947 and 1953 in the Stalinist architectural style.

It was the tallest building in Europe for 37 years, from 1953 to 1990, before being surpassed by the Messeturm in Germany. As of 2024, it remains the tallest educational building in the world.

== Features ==
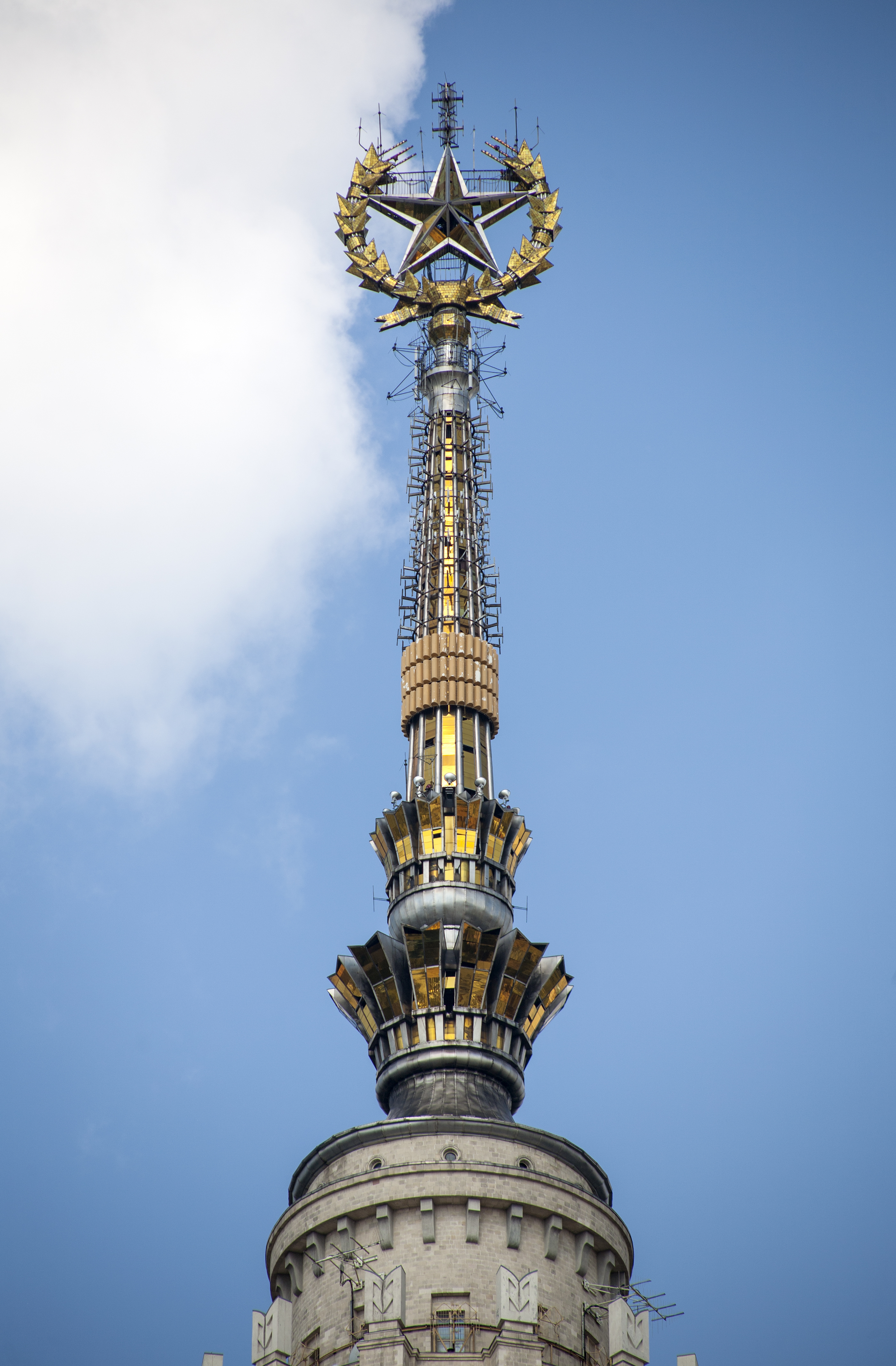
The star on top of the building

The skyscraper has 36 levels in its central part and is 239 metres (784 ft) tall. Its roof (182 metres (597 ft)) is topped by a 58-metre spire which ends with a 12-ton five-pointed star. Lateral towers are lower than the central one; two 18 and 9 storey dormitory wings define, with the central corpus of the complex, a cour d'honneur courtyard.

Among the statues which decorate the building is a sculpture by Vera Mukhina representing a couple of students and a statue by N. Tomsky of Mikhail Lomonosov (1711–1765), the founder of Moscow University. The University premises cover around 1.6 square kilometres. The complex was partially renovated in 2000.

The Main Building of Moscow State University is not open to the general public. Visitors from outside the university must be pre-approved by their university host and must submit their domestic passport (Russian) or international passport in order to gain entry.

== History ==
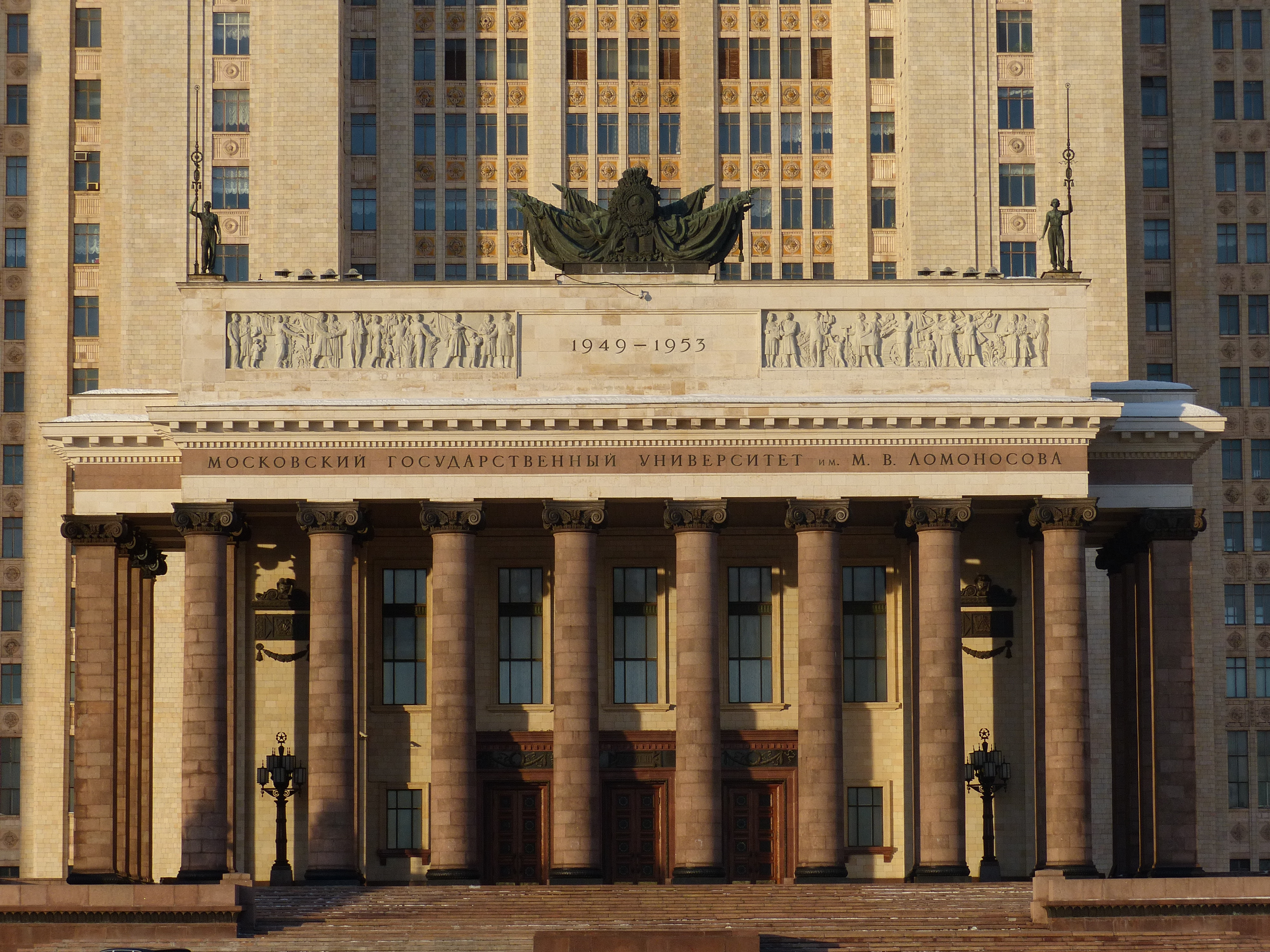
Main entrance

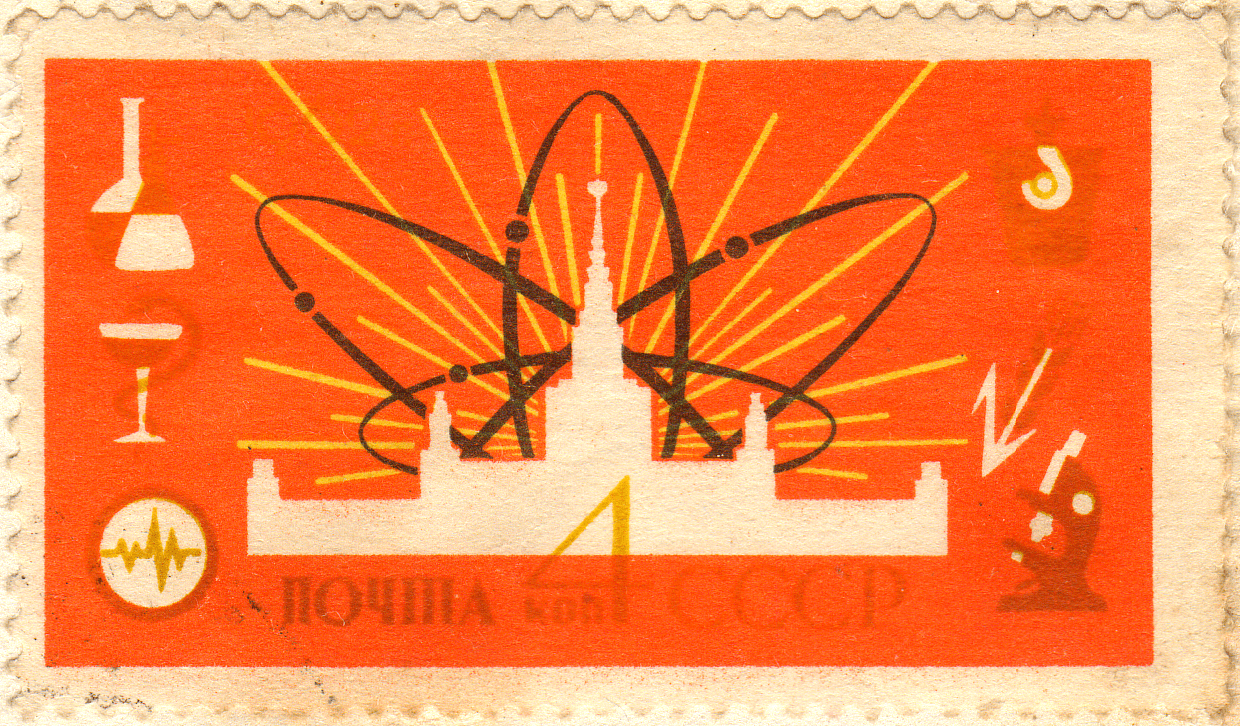
A 1960 soviet stamp features the main building of Moscow State University.

The leading architect Boris Iofan bid for the skyscraper project in 1947 but the job was assigned to Lev Rudnev, because Iofan made a mistake placing his draft skyscraper right on the edge of Sparrow Hills, a site concerned with a potential landslide hazard. Rudnev had already built important edifices like the M. V. Frunze Military Academy (1932–1937) and the Marshals' Apartments (Sadovaya-Kudrinskaya, 28, 1947), earning the esteem of the Communist Party. He set the building 800 meters away from the cliff. The chief of the engineers' team was Vsevolod Nikolaevich Nasonov.

The main tower, which consumed over 40,000 tons of steel for its framework and 130,000 cubic metres of concrete, was inaugurated on September 1, 1953. At 240 metres tall, it was the 7th tallest building of the world as well as the tallest in Europe. Its European height record held until 1990 when it was surpassed by the Messeturm in Frankfurt, Germany. It was also, and still remains, the tallest educational building in the world.

Moscow University is probably the best known of Rudnev's buildings, for which he was awarded the Stalin Prize in 1949. The University skyline inspired various buildings in the socialist countries, like the Palace of Culture and Science in Warsaw, and also the logo of 1980 Moscow Olympic Games.

== Gallery ==
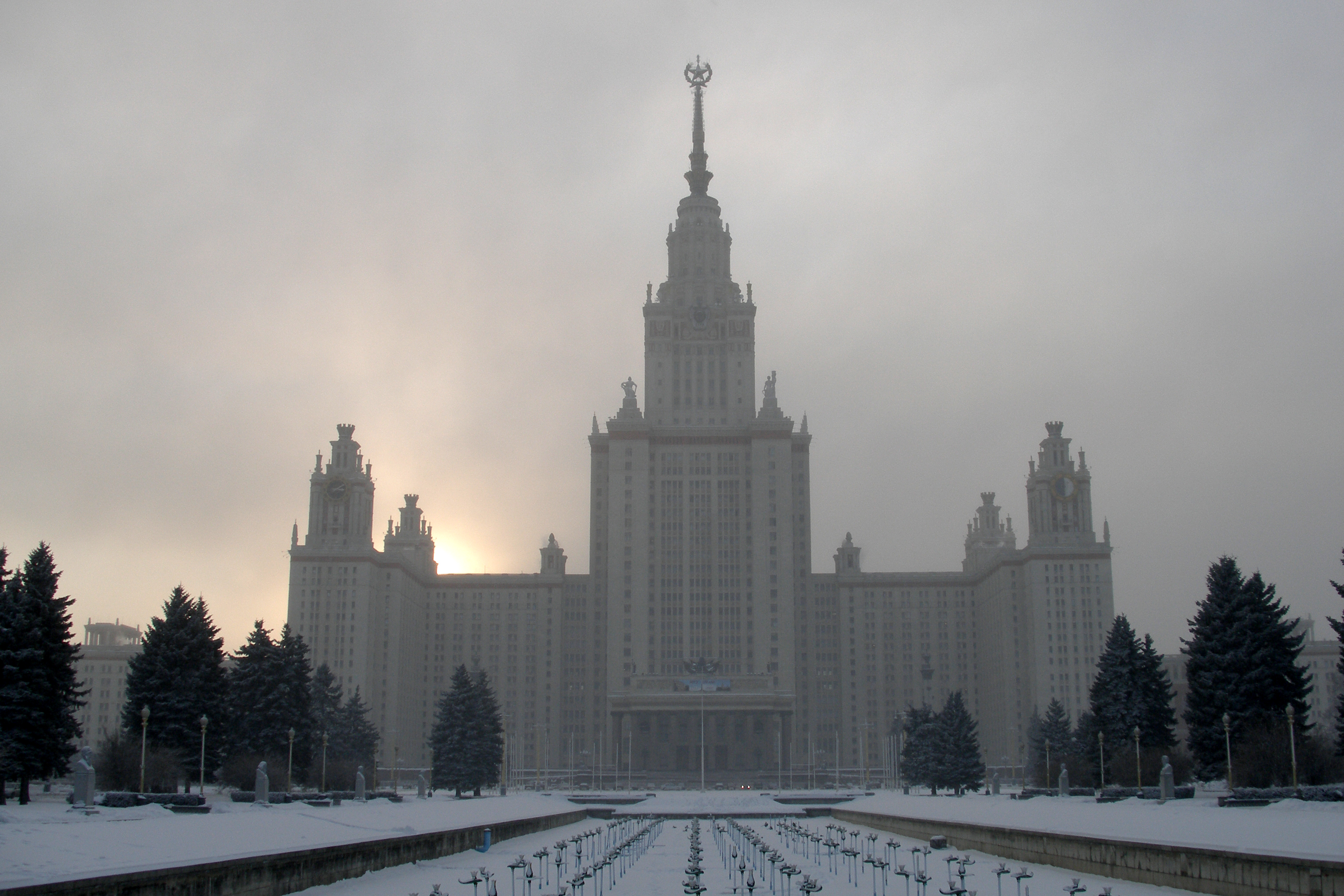

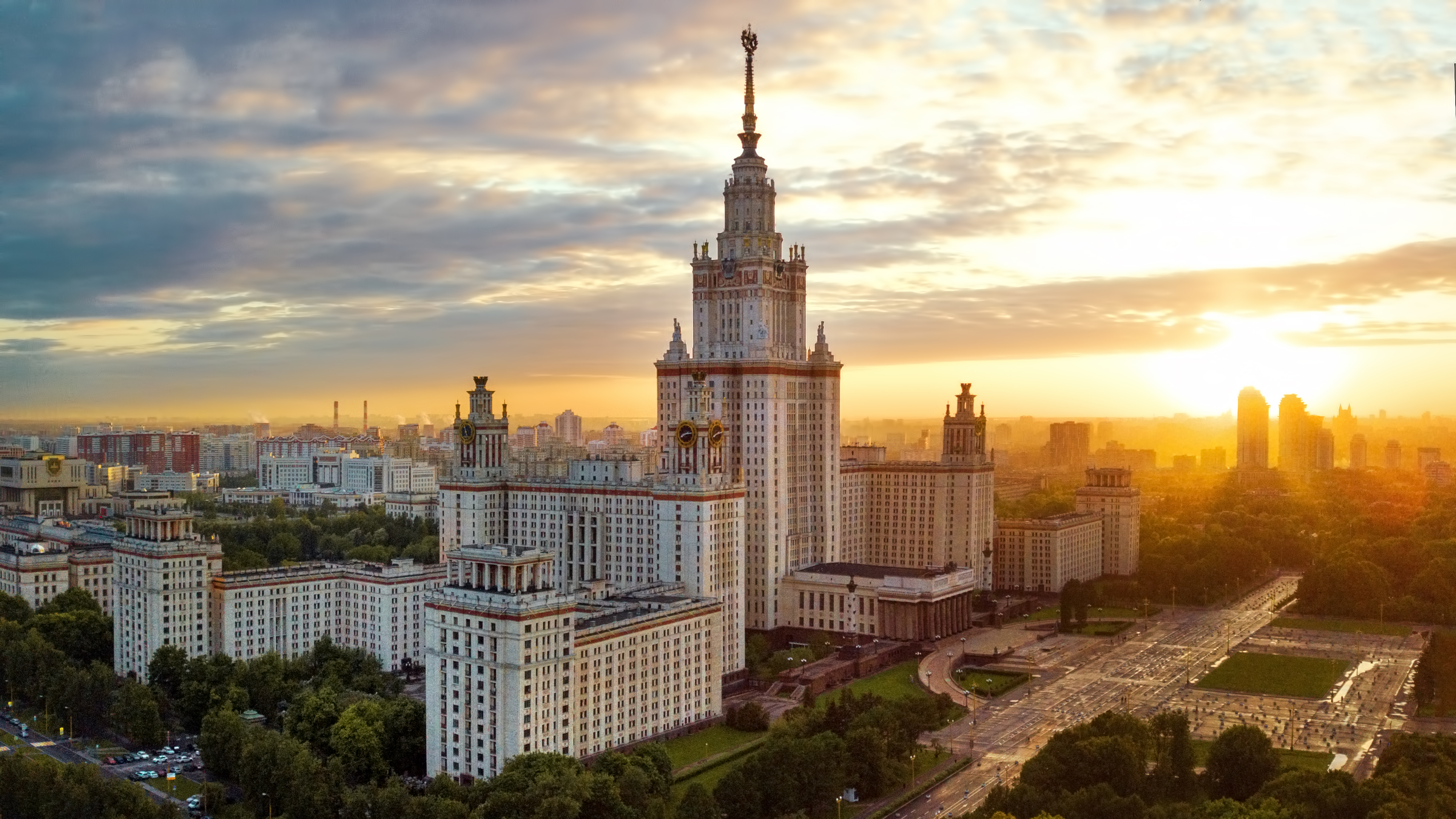

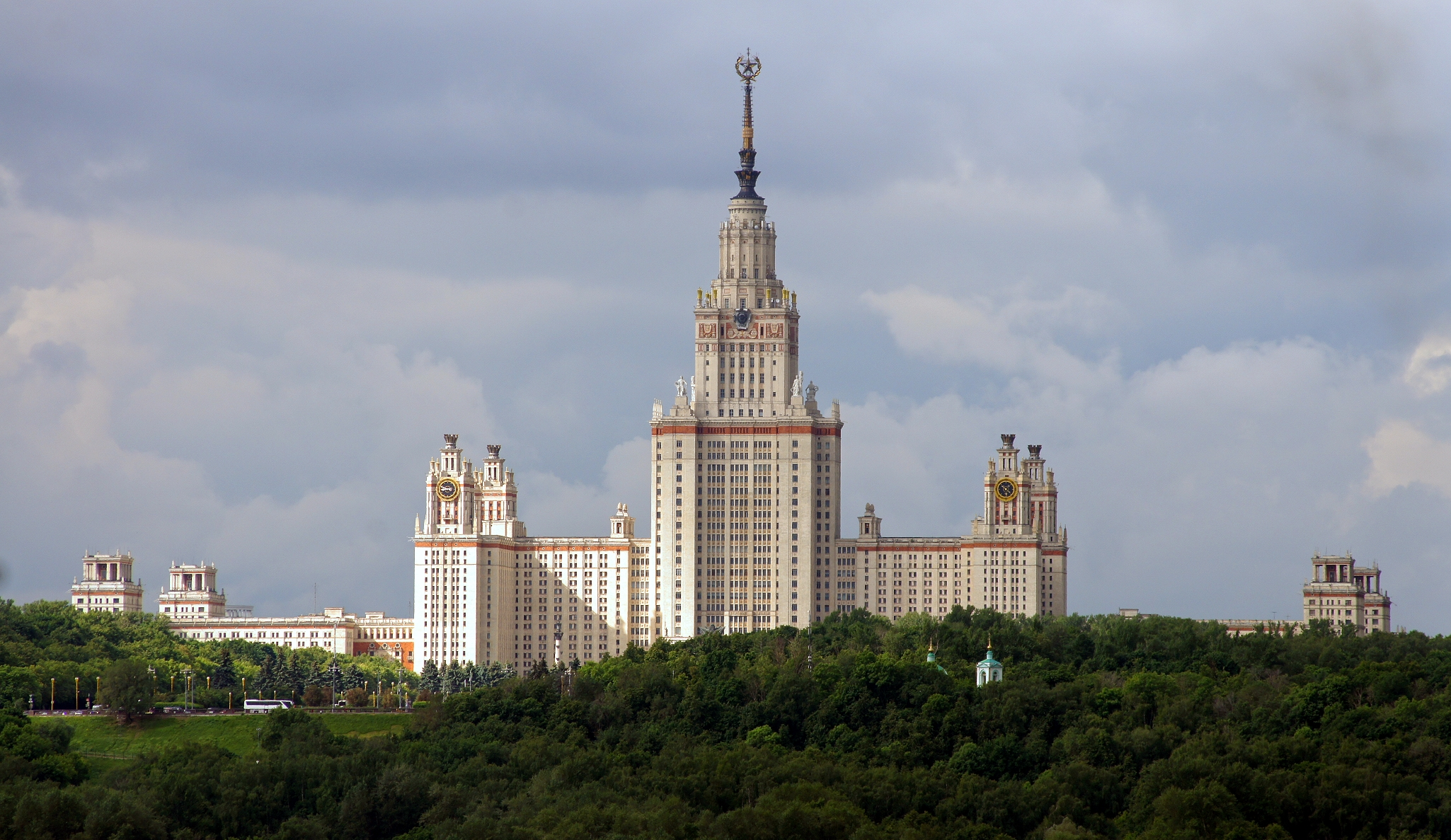

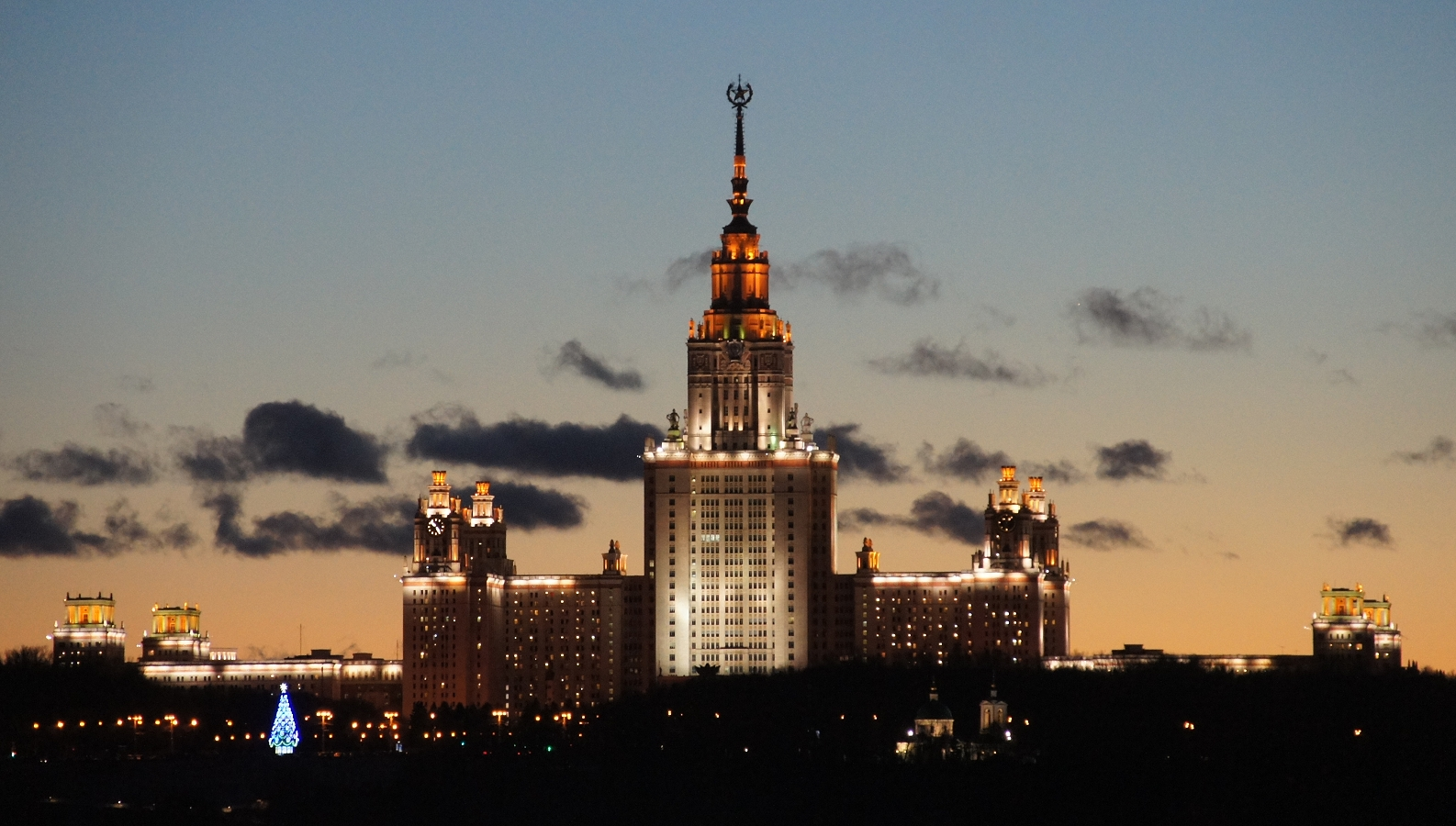

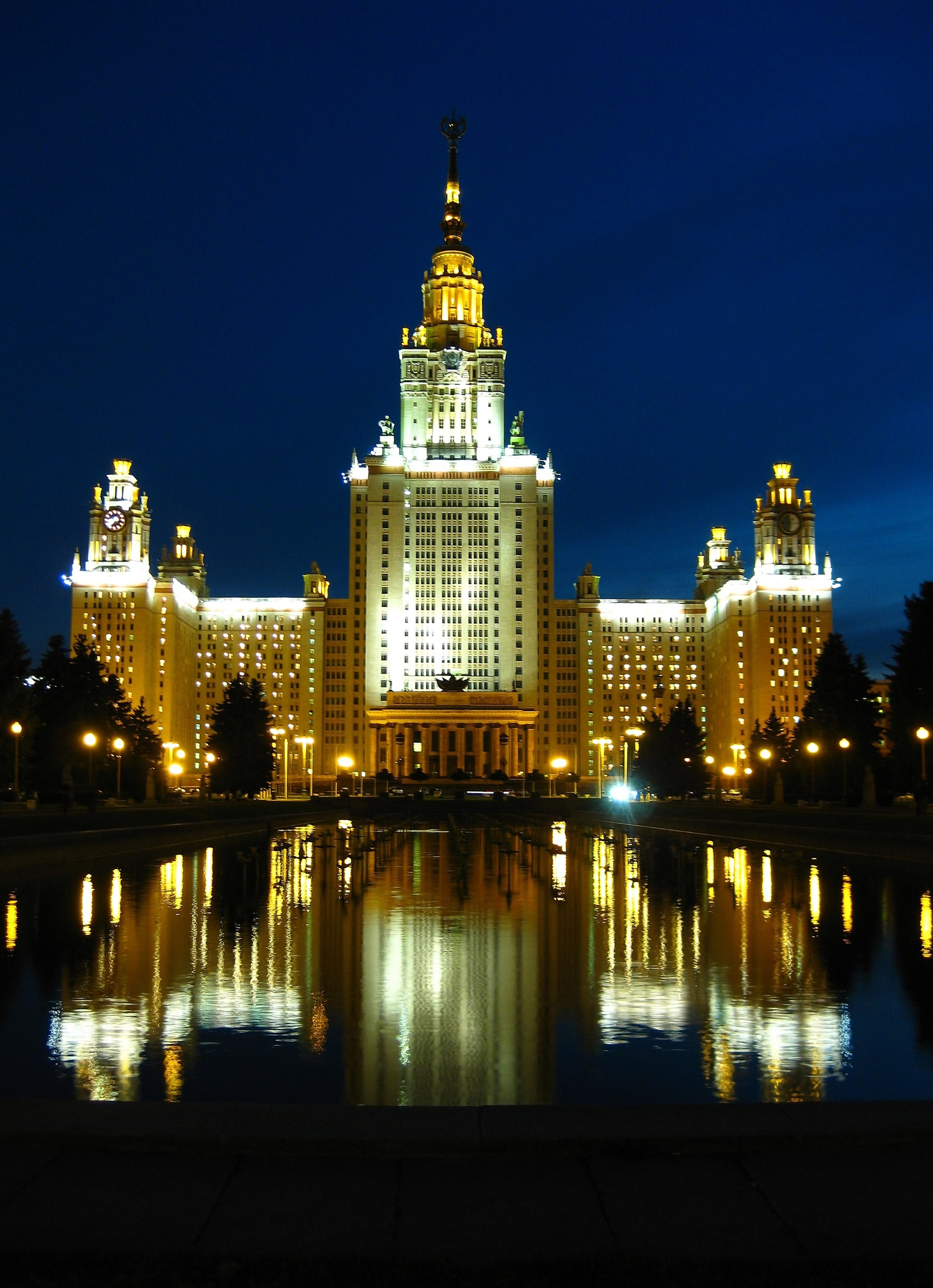

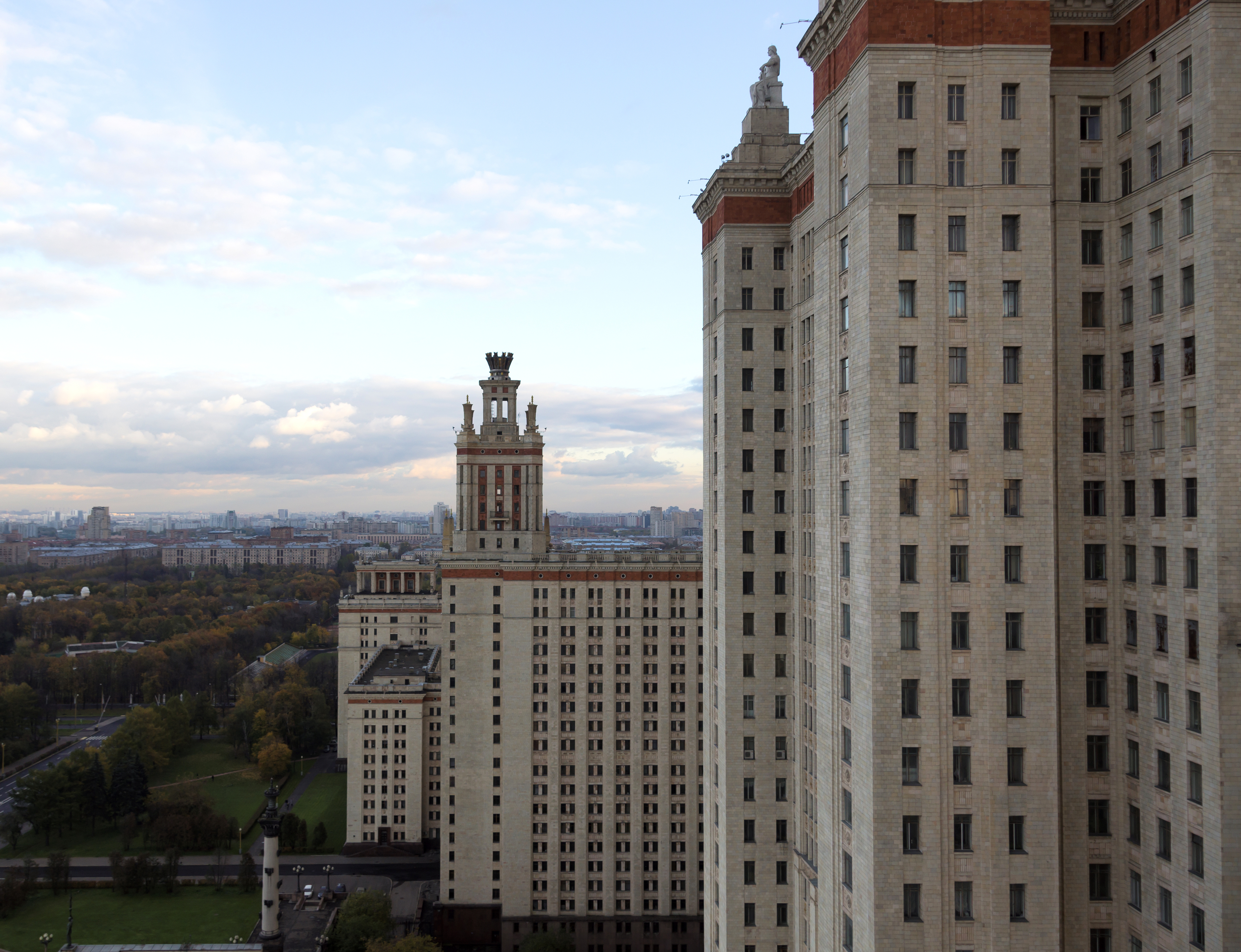

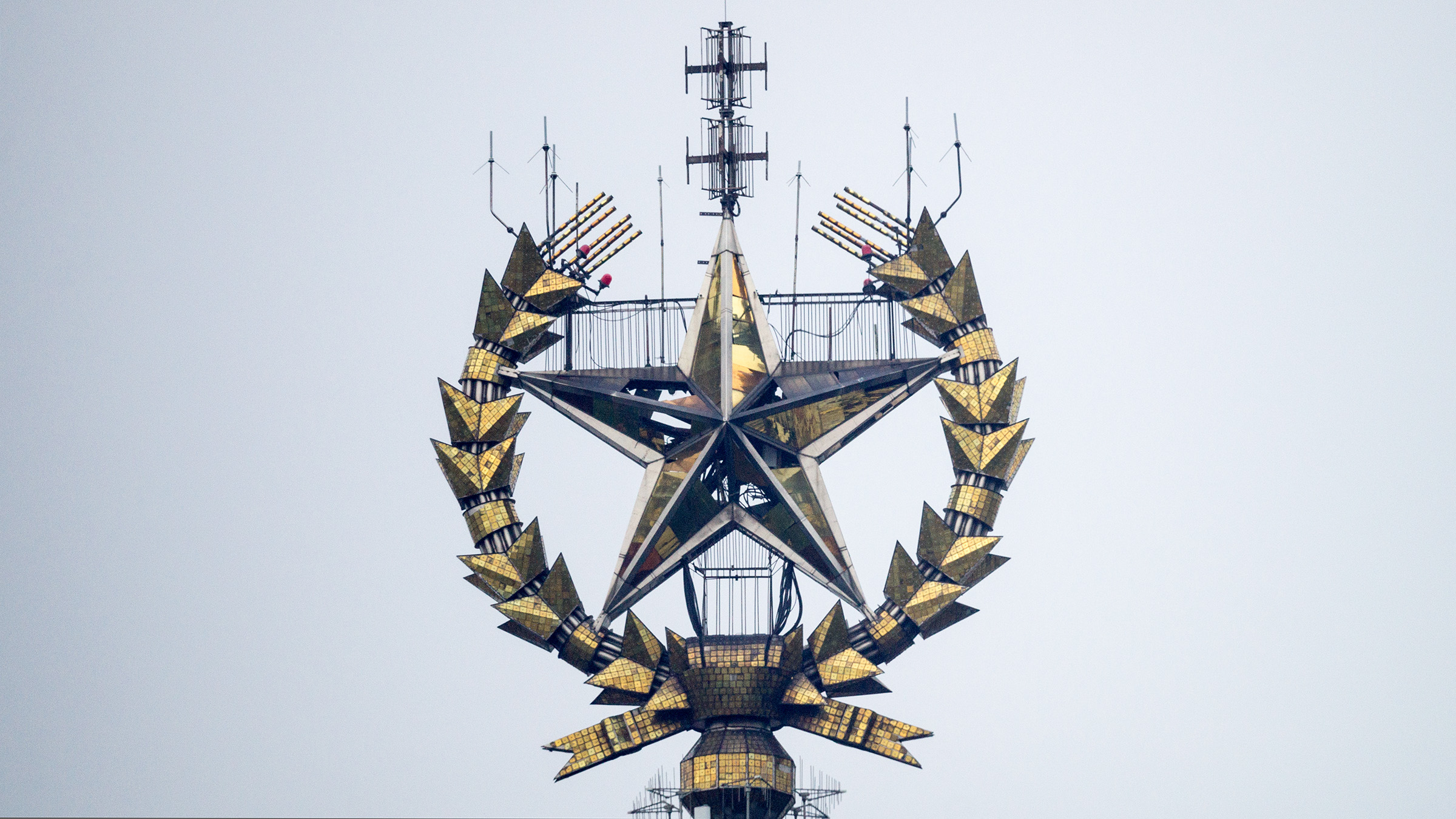

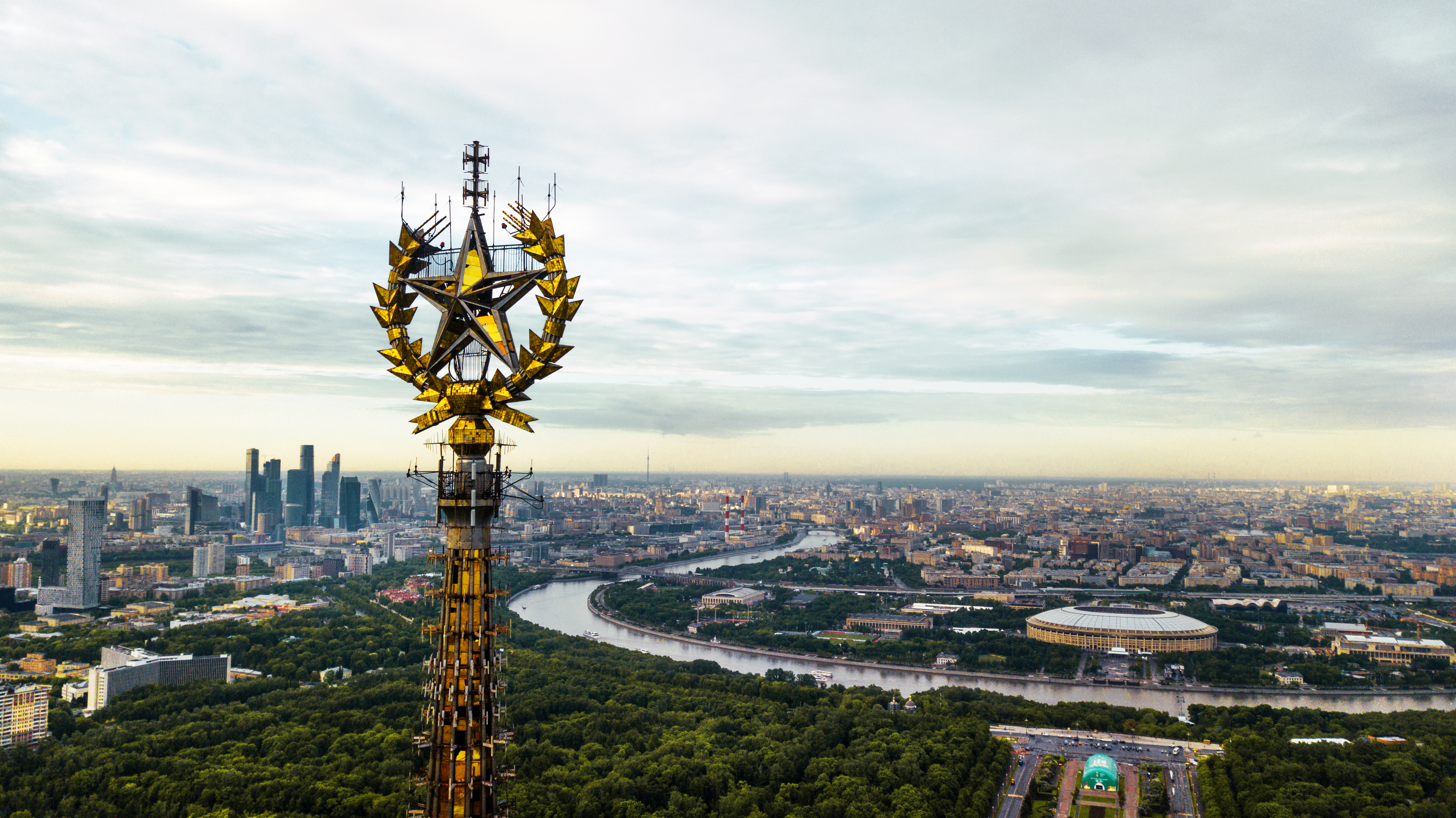

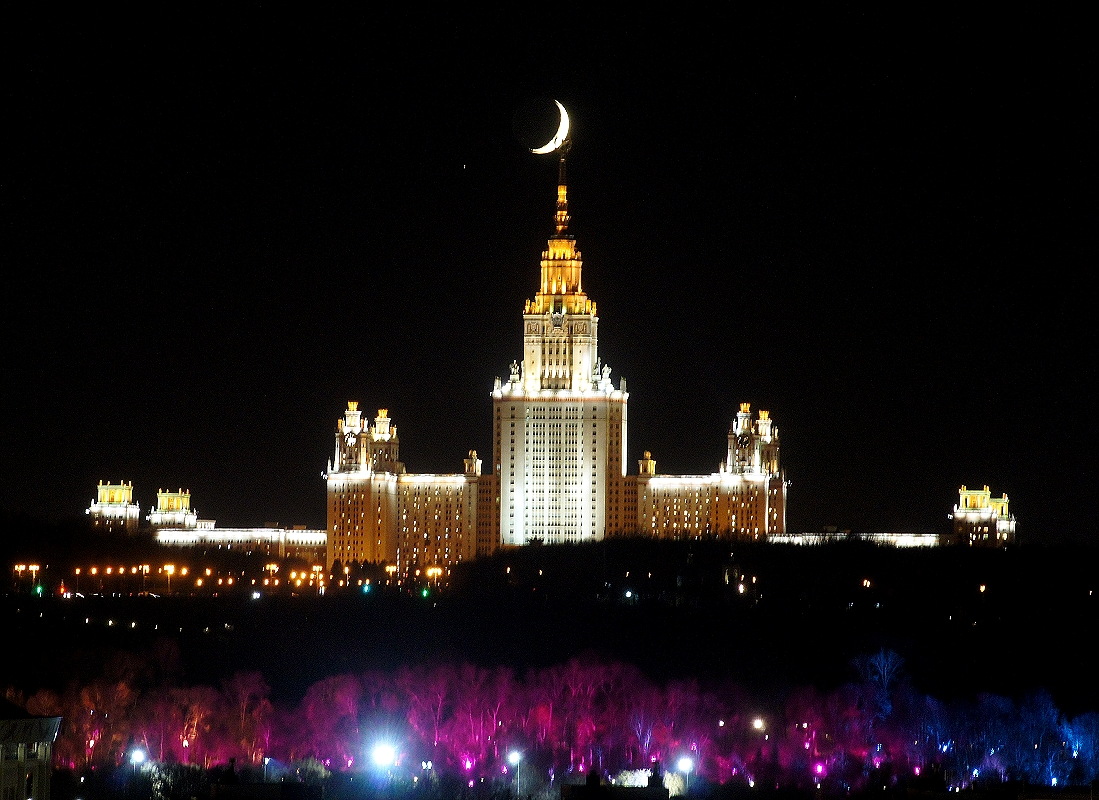

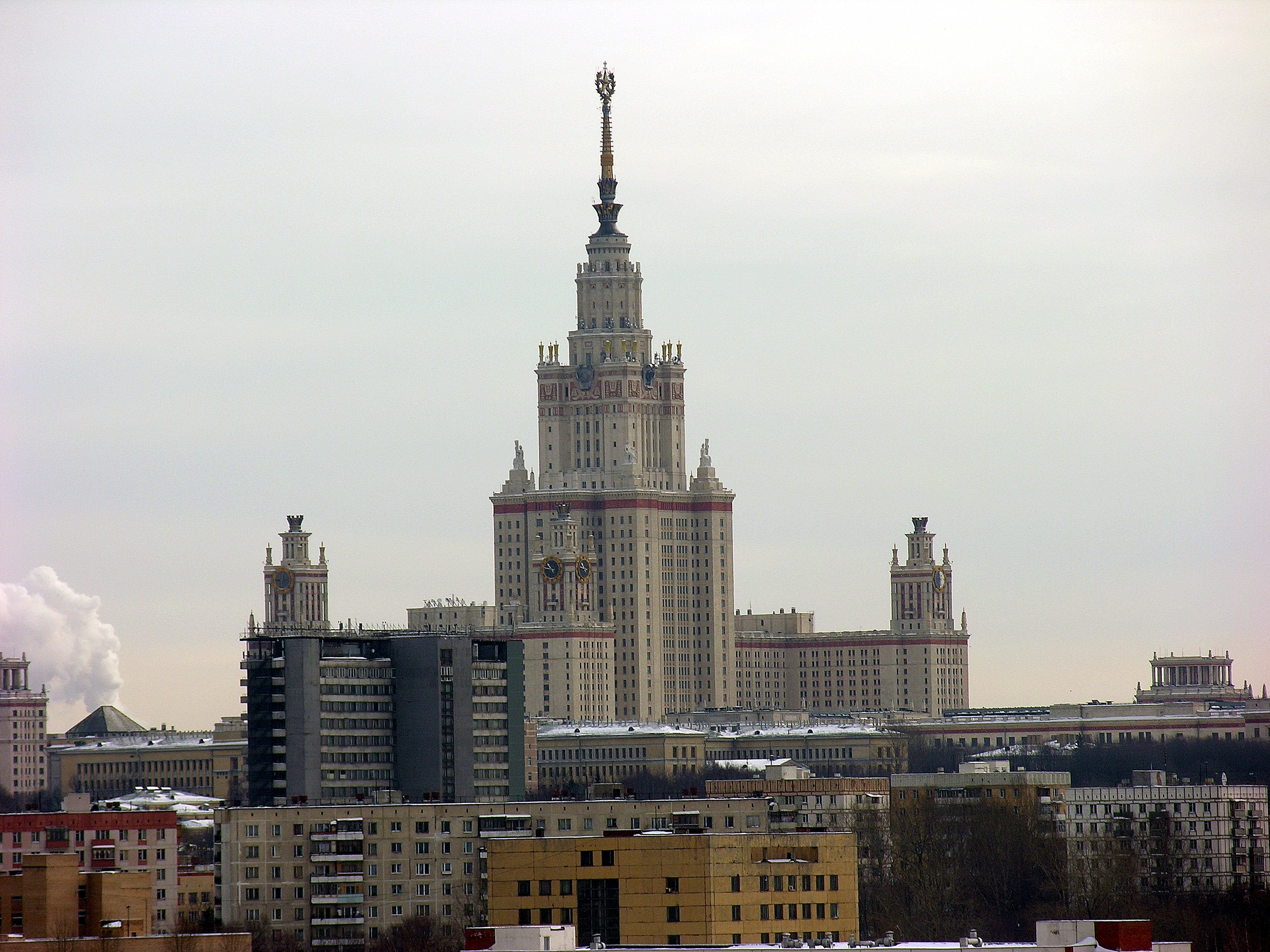

== See also ==
- Education in Russia

== Notes ==
Records
Preceded by Kotelnicheskaya Embankment Building	Tallest Building in Europe; 1953–1990; 240 m	Succeeded by Messeturm
Preceded by None	Tallest Building in the Former Soviet Union; 1991–2005; 240 m	Succeeded by Triumph Palace
Preceded by Kotelnicheskaya Embankment Building	Tallest Building in the Soviet Union; 1953–1991; 240 m	Succeeded by None
Preceded by None	Tallest Building in Russia; 1991–2005; 240 m	Succeeded by Triumph Palace
Preceded by Kotelnicheskaya Embankment Building	Tallest Building in the Russian SFSR; 1953–1991; 240 m	Succeeded by None
Preceded by Kotelnicheskaya Embankment Building	Tallest Building in Moscow; 1953–2005; 240 m	Succeeded by Triumph Palace
