= Palace of Culture and Science =

High-rise building in Warsaw, Poland

- Pałac Kultury i Nauki – PKiN
- Palace of Culture and Science from Varso Tower

General information
- Type: Mixed-use
- Architectural style: Stalinist
- Location: Warsaw, Poland, Plac Defilad 1
- Coordinates: 52°13′54″N 21°00′23″E
- Construction started: 2 May 1952
- Completed: 22 July 1955

Height
- Architectural: 237 m (778 ft)
- Roof: 187.68 m (615.7 ft)
- Observatory: 114 m (374 ft)

Technical details
- Floor count: 42
- Floor area: 123,084 m^{2} (1,324,865 sq ft)

Design and construction
- Architect: Lev Rudnev

Other information
- Number of rooms: 3288
- Public transit: Świętokrzyska; Centrum

Website
- www.pkin.pl

The Palace of Culture and Science (Polish: Pałac Kultury i Nauki; (Note: Polish pronunciation: [ˈpawat͡s kulˈturɨ i ˈna.ukʲi]) PKiN (Note: Polish pronunciation: [pɛ ka i ˈɛn])) is a notable high-rise building in central Warsaw, Poland. With a total height of 237 metres (778 ft), it is the second tallest building in both Warsaw and Poland (after the Varso Tower), the eighth tallest building in the European Union and one of the tallest on the European continent. At the time of its completion in 1955, the Palace was the eighth tallest building in the world, retaining the position until 1961. Between 2000 and 2002, it was also the tallest clock tower in the world. (Note: It remained the tallest clock tower in the world until the installation of a clock mechanism on the NTT Docomo Yoyogi Building in Tokyo, Japan.)

Inspired by Polish historical architecture and American art deco high-rise buildings, the Palace of Culture and Science was designed by Soviet architect Lev Rudnev in the spirit of the "Seven Sisters".

The Palace houses various public and cultural institutions, including theatres, museums, universities, a cinema, a concert hall, a public swimming pool, and the offices of the Polish Academy of Sciences. The building is decorated with sculptures representing the fields of culture and science. The main entrance features sculptures of the astronomer Nicolaus Copernicus, by Ludwika Nitschowa, and the poet Adam Mickiewicz, by Stanisław Horno-Popławski. Since 2007, the PKiN has been listed in the Registry of Objects of Cultural Heritage.

== Name ==
The building was originally known as the Joseph Stalin Palace of Culture and Science (Pałac Kultury i Nauki imienia Józefa Stalina). During the period of destalinization, the dedication to Stalin was revoked. Stalin's name was removed from the colonnade, the interior lobby and one of the building's sculptures.

The Palace has a variety of nicknames. The most popular ones are Pekin ("Beijing", from its acronym PKiN) and patyk ("stick", presumably from its appearance). Other nicknames include pajac ("clown", a word that sounds similar to pałac), strzykawka ("syringe"), słoń w koronkowych gatkach ("elephant in lacy underwear"), ruski tort ("Russian birthday cake"), rakieta Stalina ("Stalin's rocket"), koszmarny sen pijanego cukiernika ("drunk confectioner's nightmare", attributed to poet Władysław Broniewski), and even vulgar terms such as chuj Stalina ("Stalin's dick").

== History ==
=== Construction ===
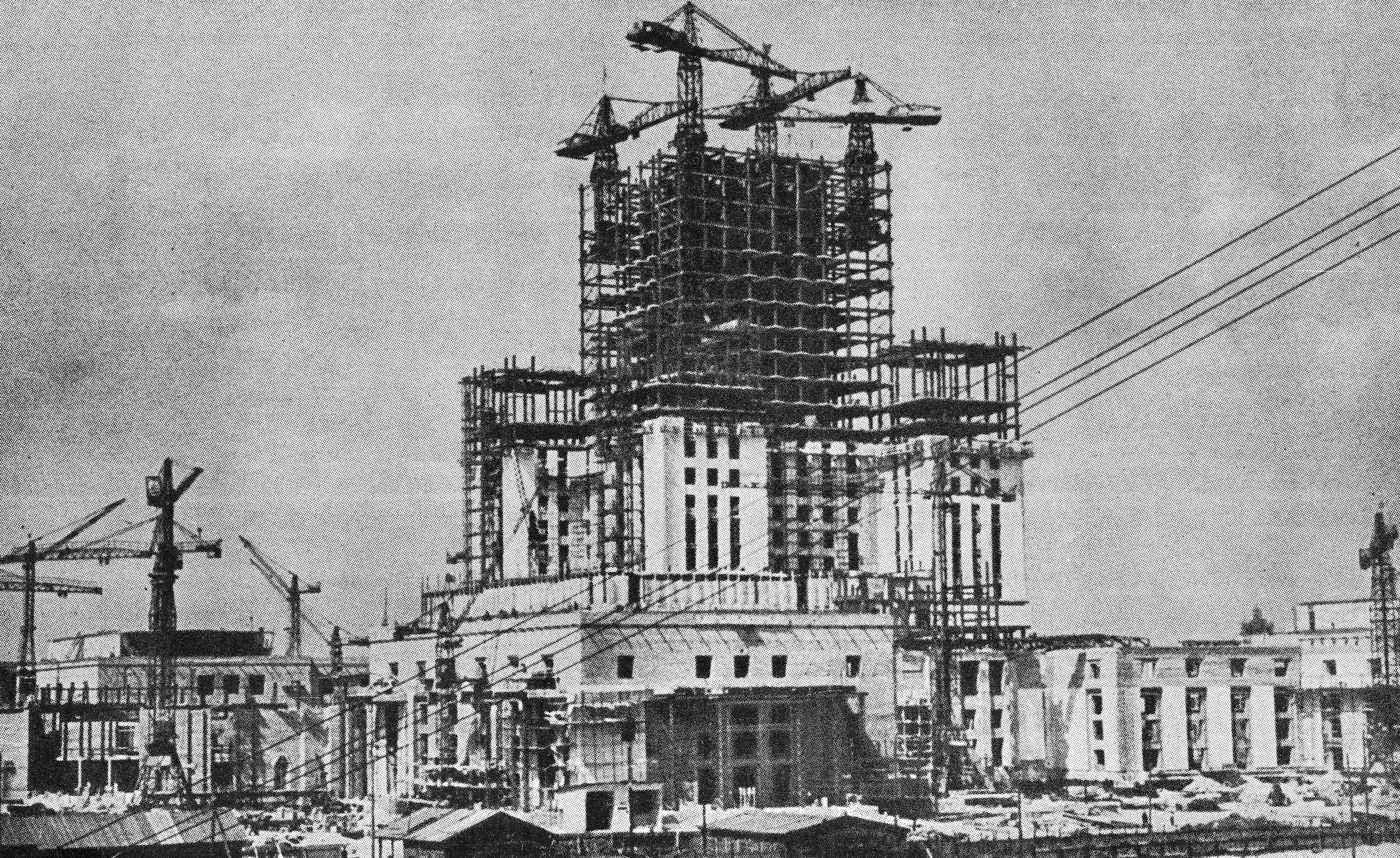
The Palace under construction in 1953

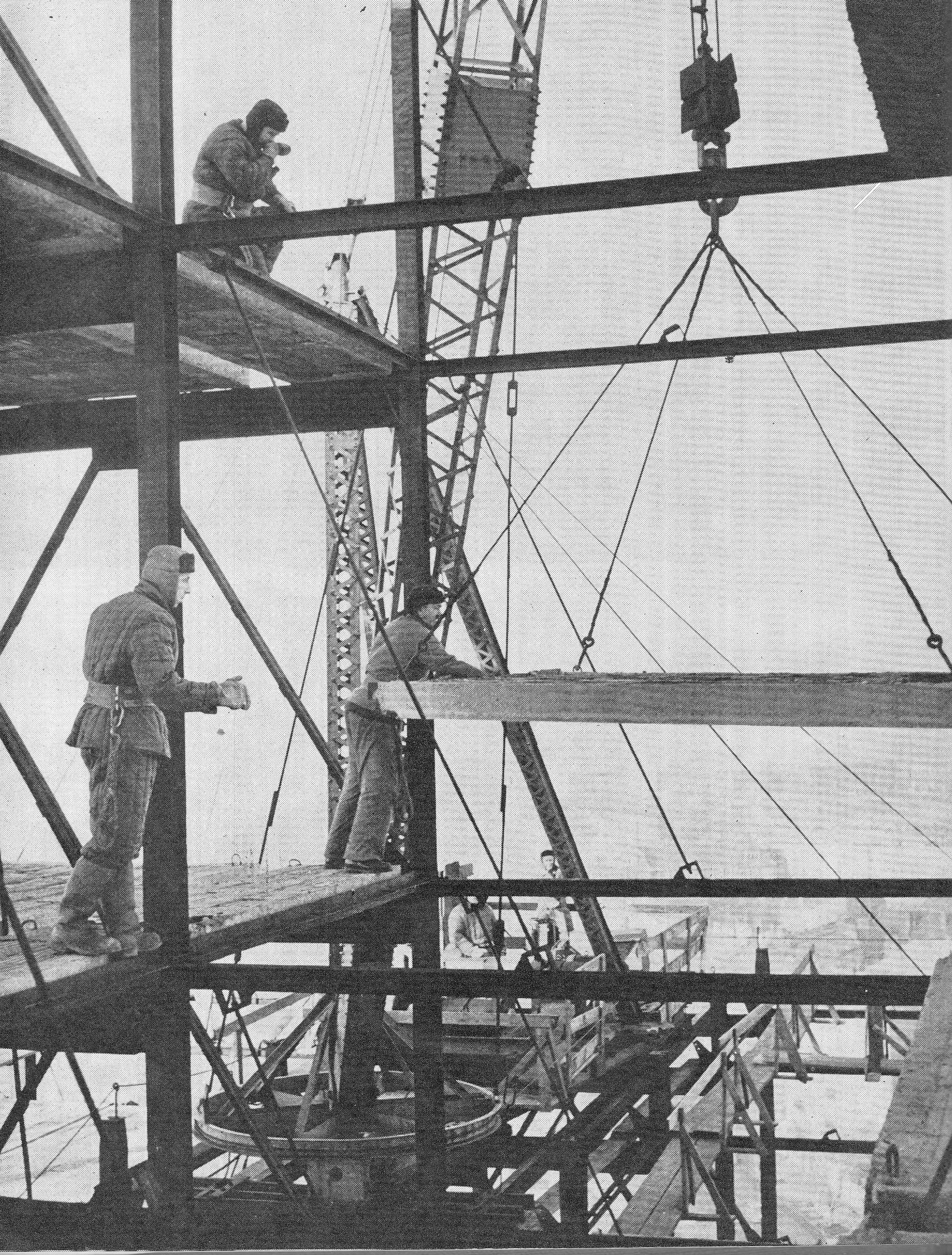
Workers on the building, 1954

The agreement to construct the tower was signed between the governments of the Polish People's Republic and the Soviet Union on 5 April 1952. It was offered as a gift to the people of Poland. Upon its completion in 1955, it was dedicated to Joseph Stalin.

To visually determine the optimal height of the building, Soviet and Polish architects gathered near the eastern approach of the Silesian-Dąbrowa Bridge. A small airplane flew over the planned site of the Palace, towing a balloon. It made the first pass at 100 m (330 ft), then at 110 and 120 m (360 and 390 ft). The Soviets, led by Lev Rudnev, decided that 120 metres (390 ft) was enough for the tallest building in the city. However, the Poles, led by the chief architect of Warsaw, Józef Sigalin, kept shouting "Higher!" after every pass. Finally, the tower's height was set at 237 metres (778 ft), with a 120 m (390 ft) main structure, a 40 m (130 ft) turret and a 77 m (253 ft) spire.

Construction started in May 1952 and lasted until July 1955. The tower was built using Soviet plans. It is estimated that between 3,500 and 5,000 Soviet guest workers and 4,000 local Polish workers participated in the project. 16 workers died in accidents during construction. The builders were housed at a new residential complex built at Poland's expense in the Bemowo district of Warsaw, called Osiedle Przyjaźń ("Friendship Neighborhood"). The complex had its own cinema, a food court, a community center and a swimming pool.

The architecture of the building has many similarities to Moscow's Seven Sisters, a group of Stalinist skyscrapers by the same architect, in particular the main building of Moscow State University. Other similar buildings are the House of the Free Press in Bucharest and the Latvian Academy of Sciences Building in Riga. However, Lev Rudnev incorporated Polish architectural details into the project after travelling around the country. For example, the parapets are modeled on Renaissance houses and the palaces of Kraków and Zamość.

=== Early years ===
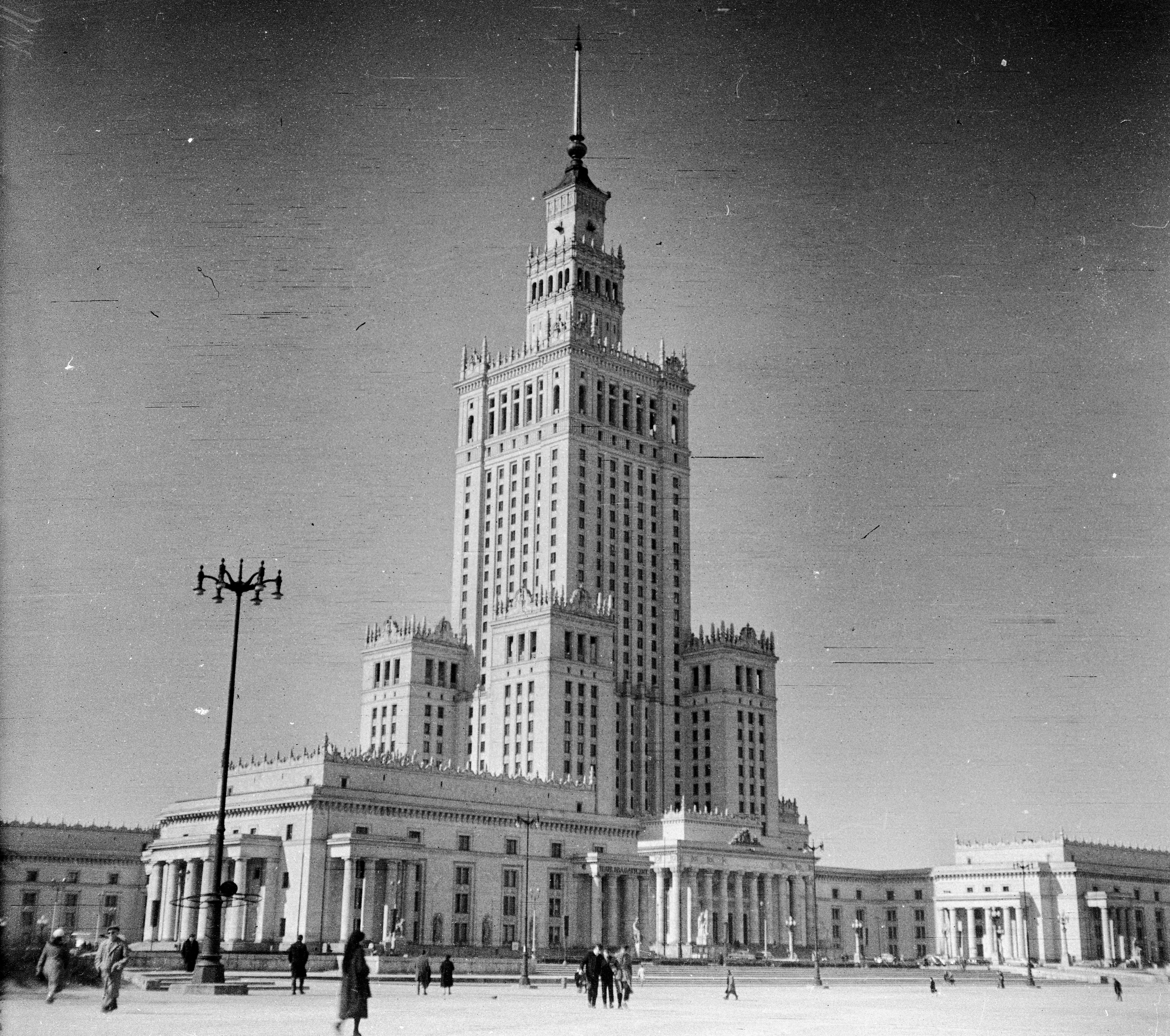
The Palace of Culture and Science in 1960

At the time of its completion, the Palace of Culture and Science was the eighth tallest building in the world and the second tallest building in Europe (after the Moscow State University Building). The Palace retained these positions until 1961 and 1990, respectively.

Shortly after opening, many visiting dignitaries toured the Palace, and the building hosted the 5th World Festival of Youth and Students, held from July to August 1955. In 1956, several people committed suicide by jumping from the observation deck on the 30th floor, at the height of 114 metres (374 ft). The first victim was a Frenchman, followed by seven Poles. After these incidents, the observation deck was enclosed in steel bars.

The Palace's concert hall has hosted performances by notable international artists. In 1967, The Rolling Stones became the first major western rock group to hold a concert behind the Iron Curtain. The 1985 concert by Leonard Cohen, held during the period of martial law in Poland, was surrounded by intense expectations that the artist would make a political statement about the growing Solidarity movement.

=== Present day ===
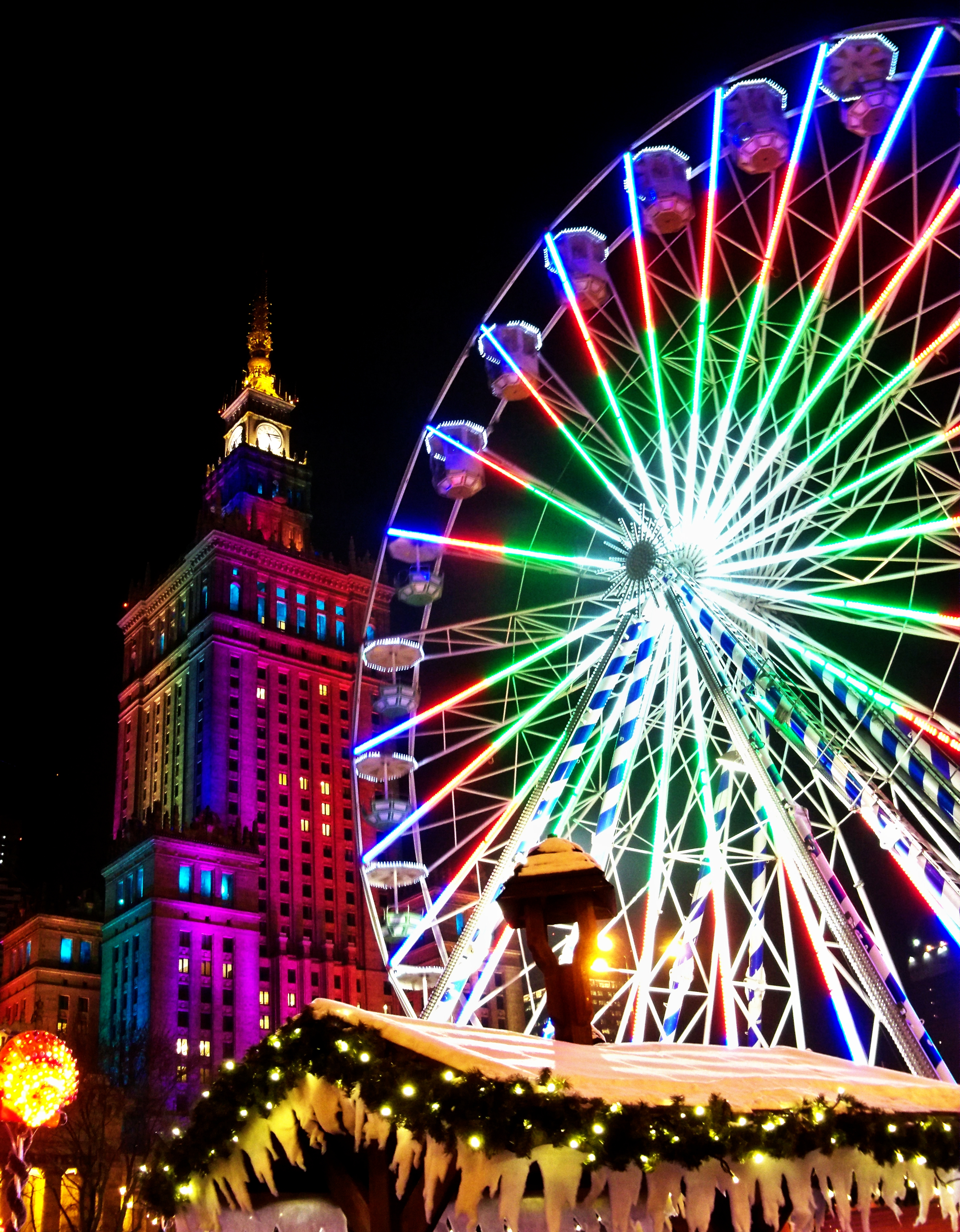
The Palace at night during Christmas market

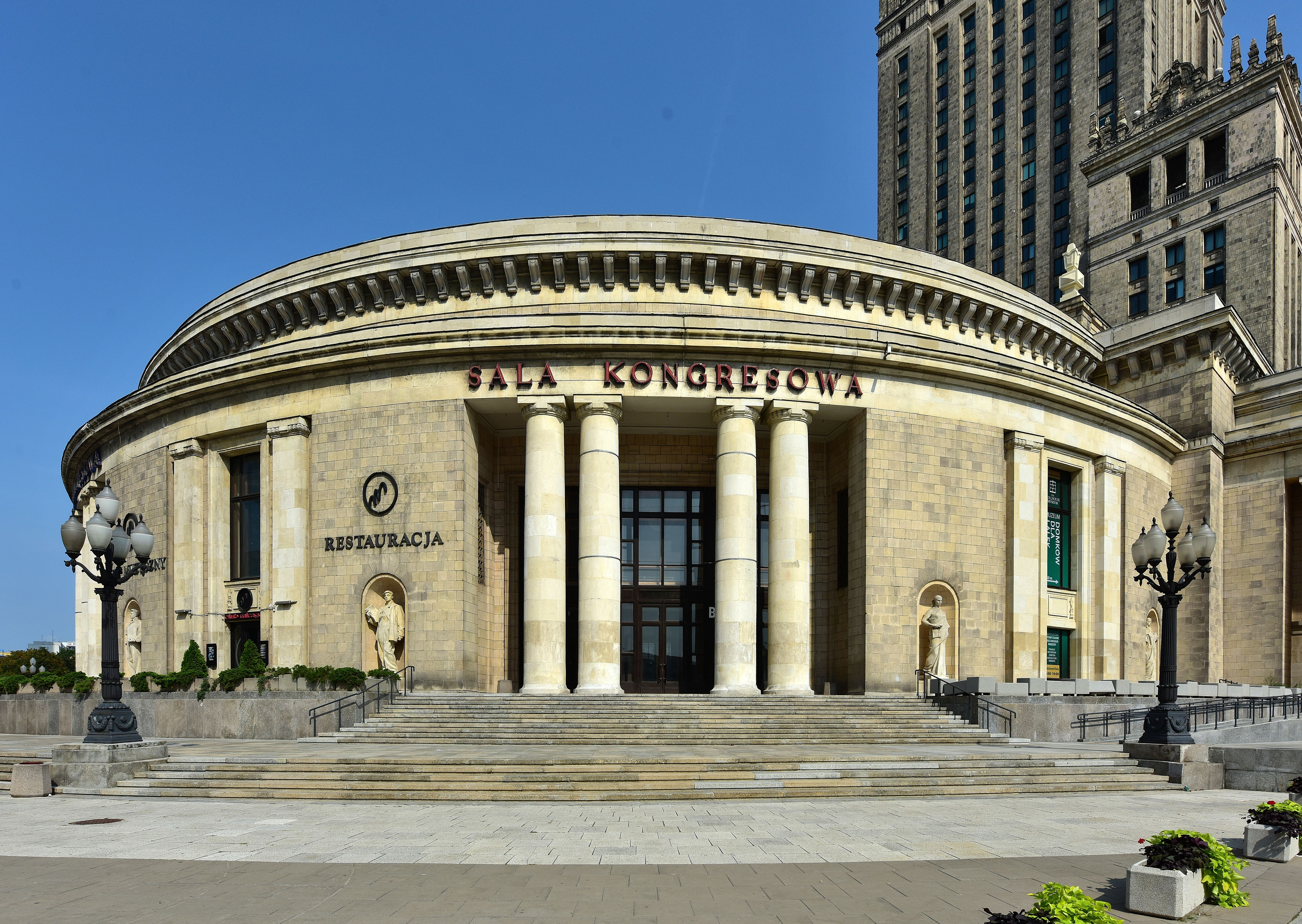
The Congress Hall at the Palace of Culture and Science

The building currently serves as an exhibition centre and office complex. The Palace contains a multiplex cinema with eight screens (Kinoteka), four theatres (Studio, Dramatyczny, Lalka and 6. piętro), two museums (Museum of Evolution and Museum of Technology), offices, bookshops, a large swimming pool, an auditorium hall for 3,000 people called Congress Hall, and an accredited universities: Collegium Civitas, on the 11th and 12th floors of the building and WSB University, Warsaw, on the 8th floor. The terrace on the 30th floor, at 114 metres (374 ft), is a well-known tourist attraction with a panoramic view of the city. The Warsaw City Council and city offices are located in the building.

A collection of sculptures representing figures of the fields of culture and science surrounds the Palace. Two of them are located in front of the main entrance: one of Polish astronomer Nicolaus Copernicus, by Ludwika Nitschowa, and another of Polish poet Adam Mickiewicz, by Stanisław Horno-Popławski.

Four 6.3-metre (21 ft) clock faces were added to the top of the building ahead of the millennium celebrations in 2000. The clocks began working on 31 December 2000.

The Congress Hall held the finals of Miss World 2006.

In 2010, the illumination of the building was modernized and high-power LED lights were installed, allowing the Palace to take various colours at night. The first use of the new lighting was during Christmas in 2010, when the Palace was illuminated in green and white to resemble a Christmas tree. In December 2013, during the Euromaidan protests, it was illuminated in blue and yellow, the colours of the Ukrainian national flag as a sign of solidarity with the protesters. On 29 January 2021, during the Women's Strike protests, the symbol of the movement—a single red bolt on a black background—was projected on the building.

== Radio and TV transmitter ==
Due to its height, the Palace has always been an attractive location for telecommunication antennas. The first antenna was installed in 1956 to transmit state television signals. In 1974, a microwave link was installed to send Polskie Radio Program I programming to the longwave Warsaw radio mast in Konstantynów. FM radio transmissions began in 1992.

Digital television transmissions began on 22 July 2008, using the DVB-T standard. Nowadays, all six digital multiplexes of the country's free-to-air broadcasters are transmitted from the Palace. Analog television transmissions were shut down on 19 March 2013.

Soviet Central Television Programme One, later Channel One Russia, was rebroadcast from the PKiN transmitter between 1 April 1987 and 31 May 1997. Its target audience was the Soviet Armed Forces (later Russian Armed Forces) personnel stationed in the country until 1993.

== Fauna ==
The 42nd floor of the Palace is a nesting place for peregrine falcons. In 2009, cameras were installed at the site, with a live view from the nest being available on the website of the Association for Wild Animals Sokół. In 2016, after a five-year break, a pair of falcons had offspring there. In a competition of internet users, the young falcons were given the names Bazyl, Orion and Wawa. In 2017, due to the maintenance works on the spire of the building, the falcons were moved to the highest floor of the Warsaw Trade Tower skyscraper. They returned to the Palace of Culture and Science after the renovation of the spire was completed.

Cats live on the second basement floor, with the administration of the Palace of Culture and Science responsible for their care. In the past, there were several dozen of them, while in June 2015 the number of these animals was 11.

Since 2015, an apiary is kept on the roof of the Studio Theatre at the Palace of Culture and Science.

== Controversy ==
The Palace of Culture and Science is highly controversial. It was built at the peak of Stalinism, when Polish citizens suffered severe violations of their human rights. As a result, it is often viewed as a symbol of Soviet domination over the Polish People's Republic.

Porozumienie Organizacji Kombatanckich i Niepodległościowych w Krakowie, a coalition of veteran and nationalist groups, and the Law and Justice party have called for its demolition. In 2009, then Foreign Minister Radosław Sikorski supported the demolition of the Palace noting the expense involved in its maintenance. Other prominent government leaders have continued to endorse demolition plans, including former Prime Minister Mateusz Morawiecki.

== See also ==
- List of tallest buildings in Warsaw
- List of tallest buildings in Poland
- Socialist realism in Poland
- Stalinist skyscrapers, overview list: "Seven Sisters" in Moscow and similar ones elsewhere
