= Luzhniki Metro Bridge =

Through arch bridge in Moscow, Russia

Coordinates: 55°42′37.0″N 37°33′33.6″E

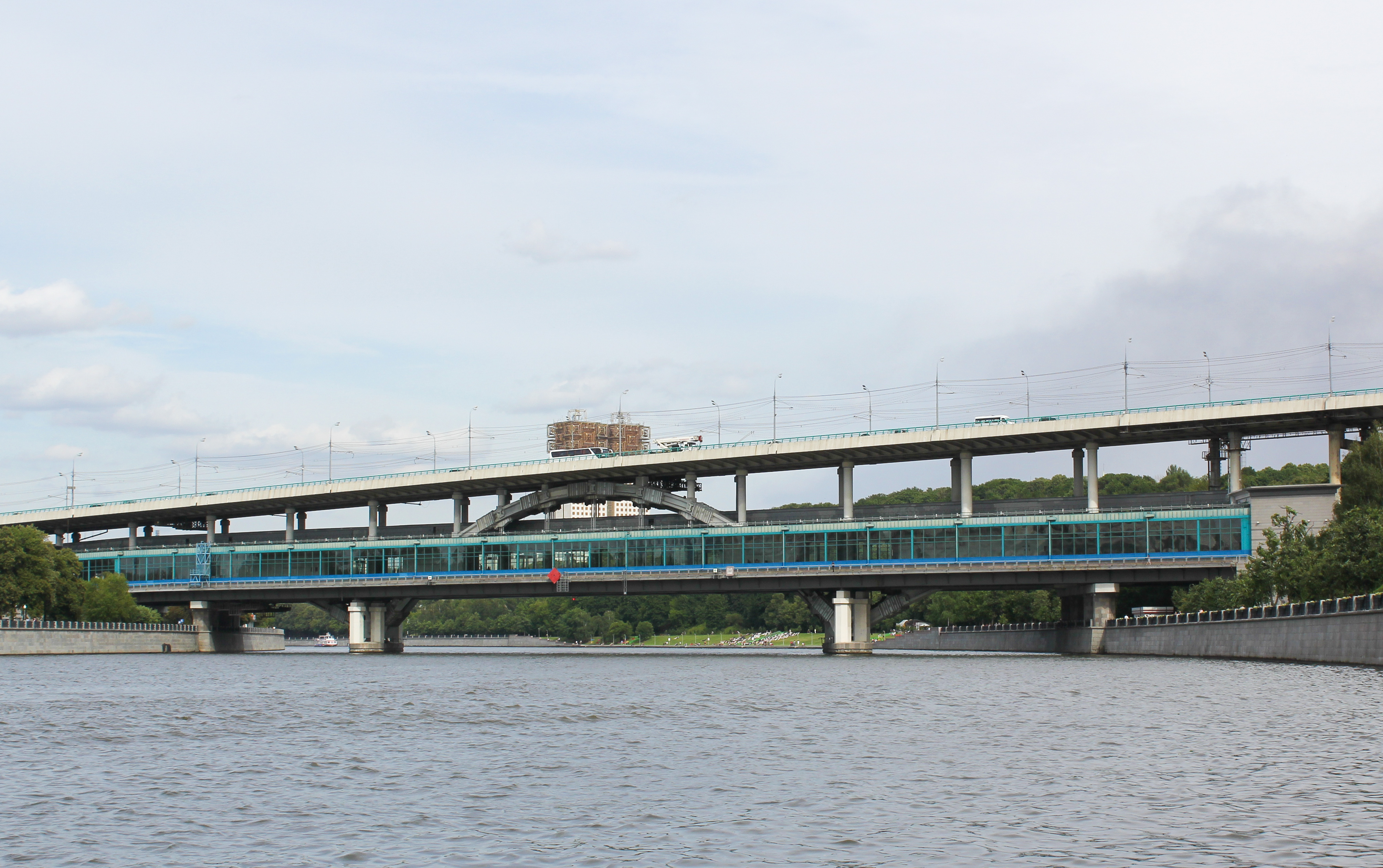
The Luzhniki bridge

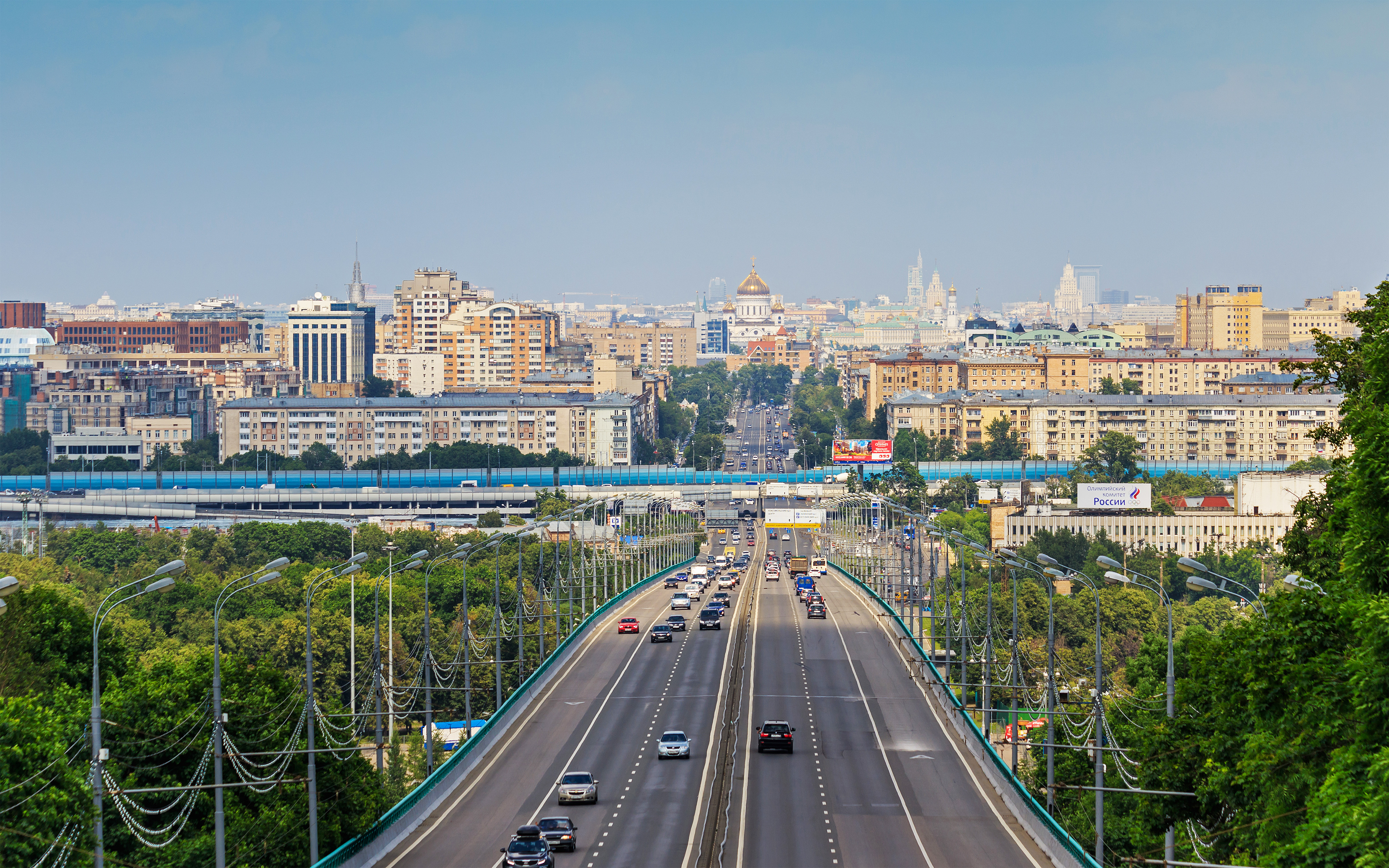
The upper level

Luzhniki Metro Bridge (Russian: Лужнецкий метромост), also known as Metromost (Метромост), is a concrete double-decked (two-level) arch bridge carrying a road and a Moscow Metro line across the Moskva River in Moscow, Russia. It connects the neighbourhood of Luzhniki Stadium to Sparrow Hills. The bridge houses Vorobyovy Gory, the only station of Moscow Metro located over water. Designed in 1958 by V.G. Andreyev and N.N. Rudomasin (structural engineering), the bridge rapidly decayed and was rebuilt in 1997–2002.

== Metro Bridge (1958) ==
The bridge was officially opened January 12, 1959. Total length with ramps 1,179 meters, arch spans 45 - 108 – 45 meters. The upper deck, 25.8 meters wide, carried 6 lanes of traffic, the lower deck housed Vorobyovy Gory metro station. The bridge was completed in 19 months. The bridge builders used salt to speed up concrete hydration; in 1959, it was commissioned with incomplete moisture protection. This caused rapid corrosion of rebars and tension cables.

== Decay (1958–1997) ==
On July 8, 1959, rain water broke through the station hall roofing and flooded the tracks. In the following years, aluminium and steel parts of the station hall started falling apart, hiding far worse corrosion processes inside the concrete structure. As early as 1963, examinations signalled imminent danger. By 1983, the bridge had lost 60% of its structural load capacity. In 1983, the station was closed, in 1986-87 the subway tracks diverted to temporary steel box girder bridges (29 meters left and 29 meters right from the main bridge axis).

== Reconstruction (1997–2002) ==
Reconstruction began with the demolition of the station hall, opening access to the main arches. The inner arches remained standing; their concrete bowstring was replaced with a steel tie. Once the arch was reinforced, in 1999, the builders demolished the automobile road deck and the columns that carried it. The new concrete deck was commissioned for automobile traffic in 2000. In July–August 2001, subway traffic returned to the main bridge tracks, the temporary bridges were removed; the restored subway station reopened on December 14, 2002.

== See also ==
- List of bridges in Moscow
