= Sparrow Hills =

Hill in southwest central Moscow, Russia

Coordinates: 55.710°N 37.543°E

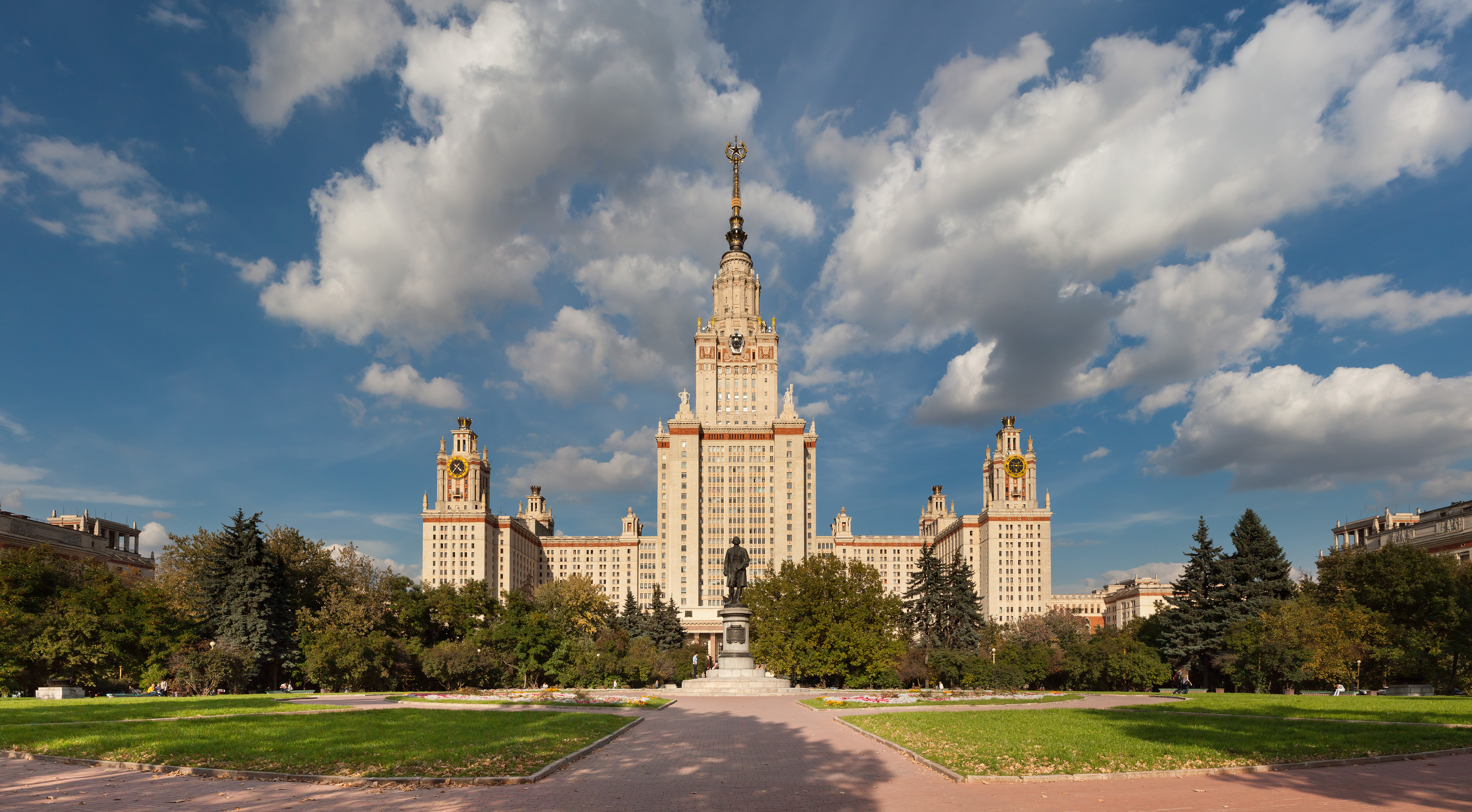
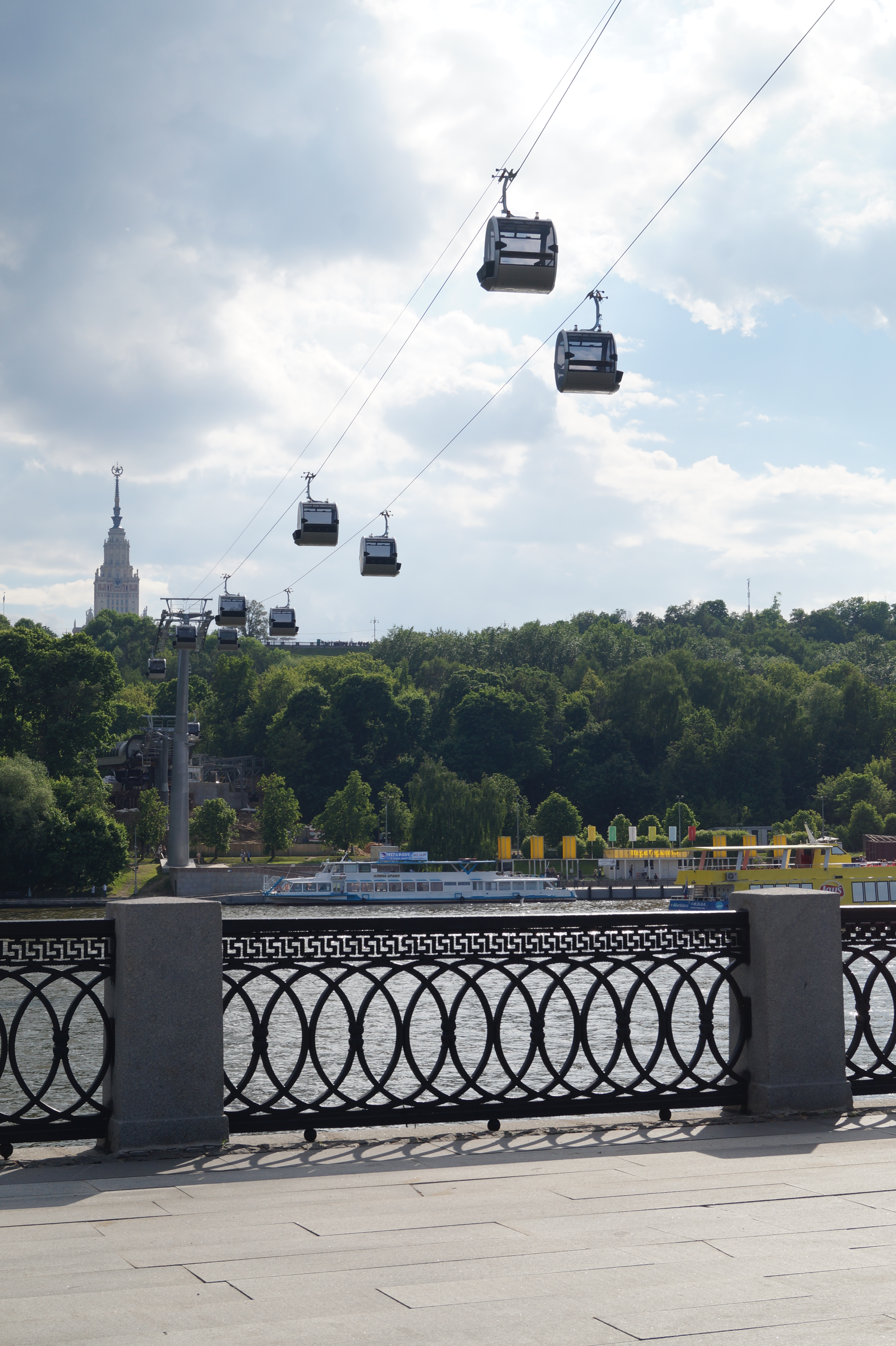
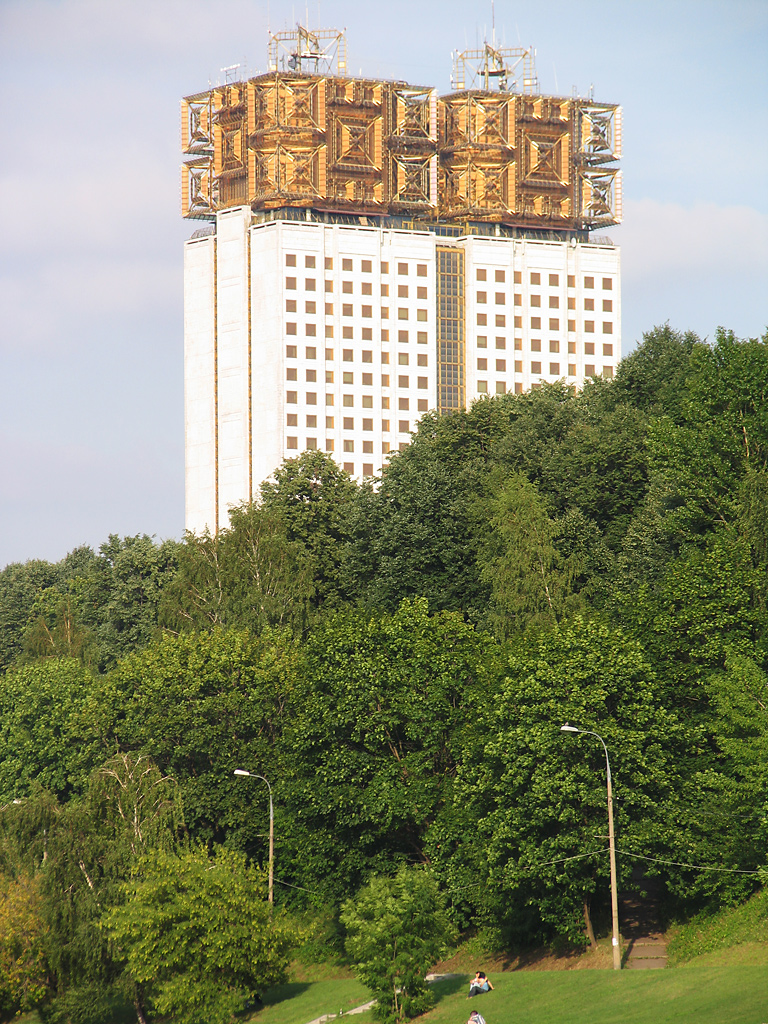
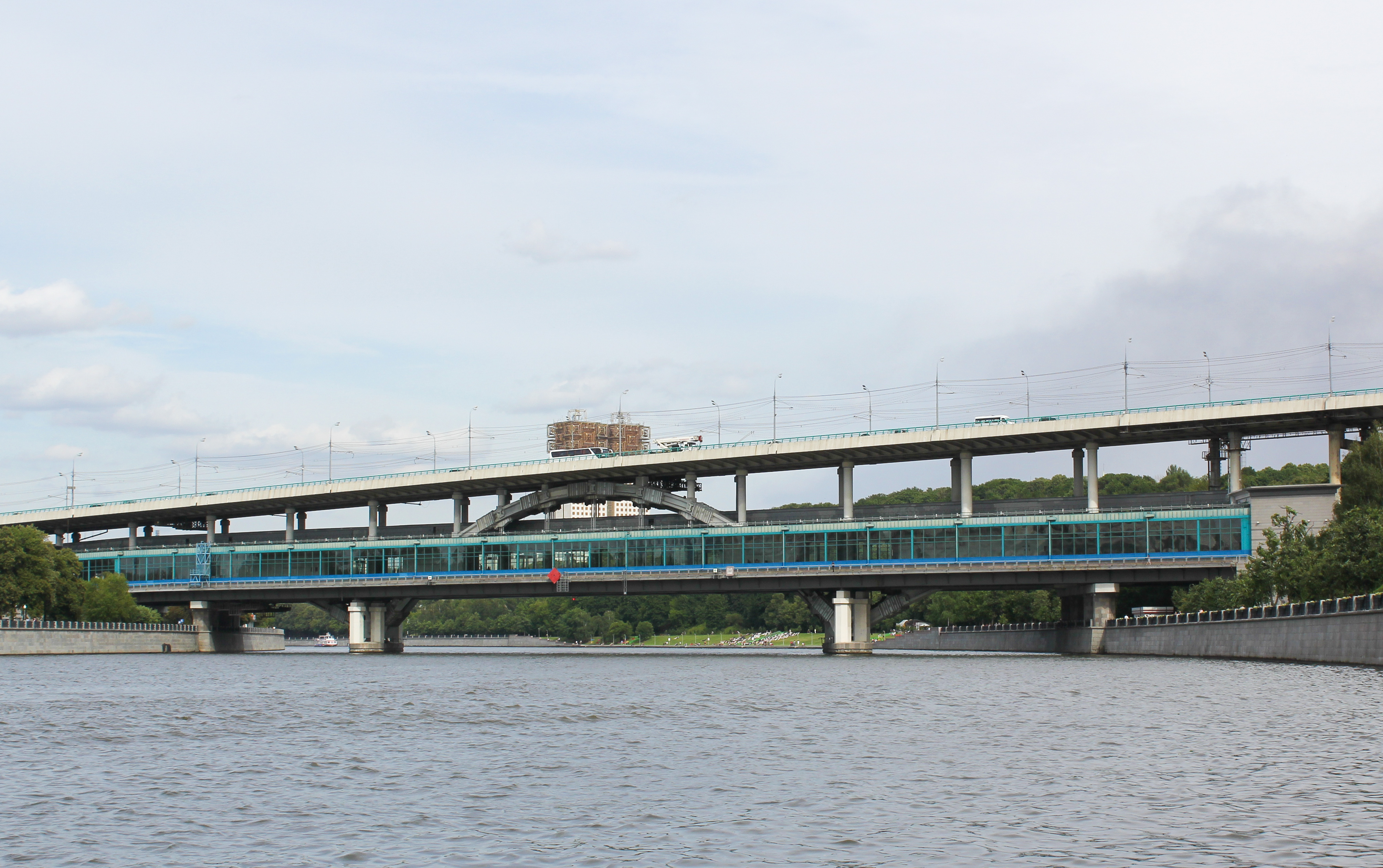
- Clockwise from top: Moscow State University, Russian Academy of Sciences, Luzhniki Metro Bridge, Sparrow Hills Cableway

Highest point
- Elevation: 80 m (260 ft)

Geography
- Location: Moscow, Russia

Sparrow Hills (Russian: Воробьёвы го́ры, Vorobyovy gory), formerly known as Lenin Hills (Ле́нинские го́ры, Leninskiye gory), is a hill on the right bank of the Moskva River and one of the highest points in Moscow, reaching a height of 80 m (260 ft) above the river level.

The observation platform is on a steep bank 85 m (279 ft) above the river, or 200 m (660 ft) above sea level. The Central Lenin Stadium, where the opening and closing ceremonies for the 1980 Summer Olympics took place, is right below, across the Moskva River. Next to it is the Novodevichy Convent, with its Naryshkin Baroque towers.

Not far from the observation platform is the Luzhniki Metro Bridge. The two-level Metro-Bridge traverses the river to link Komsomolsky Prospekt with Vernadsky Prospekt. It serves two urban transport systems: motor vehicles and the Moscow Metro subway. The glass-walled subway station Vorobyovy Gory is at the lower level of the bridge.

The hills, immortalized by many Russian poets and writers, have been named after the village Vorobyovo, which was acquired by Grand Duchess Sophia of Lithuania, Vytautas's only daughter, from the boyars Vorobyovs in 1453. Alexander I of Russia wished to build the Cathedral of Christ the Saviour there; his successor had construction works suspended and the cathedral eventually was erected near the Kremlin.

The main landmarks of the hills are the Moscow State University (at one time the tallest building in Europe) and the Trinity Church.

The Sparrow Hills were renamed Lenin Hills (Ле́нинские го́ры, Leninskiye gory) in 1935 after Vladimir Lenin. The historic name was restored in 1999.

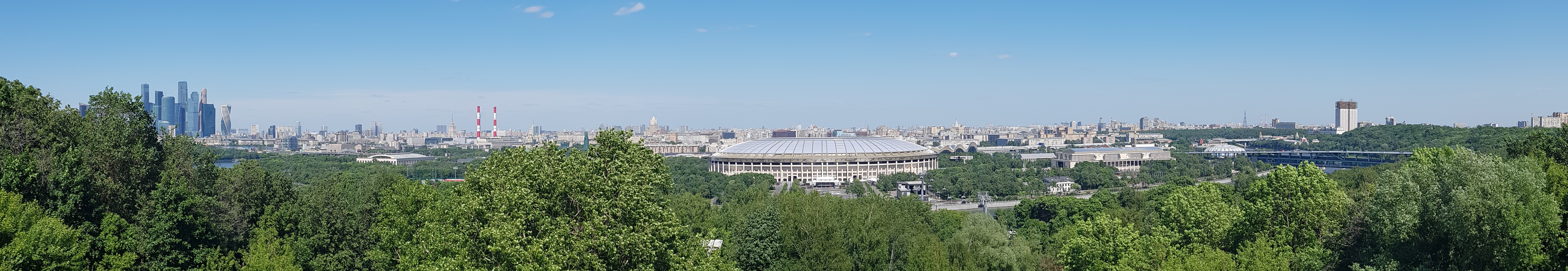
View from Sparrow Hills to the central and north part of Moscow

== Literature ==
- Собрание государственных грамот и договоров, хранящихся в коллегии иностранных дел. ч. 1 с. 192. Москва, в типографии Н. С. Всеволожского, 1813.
- Тихомиров М. Н. Древняя Москва (XII—XV вв.) : Моск. гос. ун-т им. М. В. Ломоносова М. : Изд-во МГУ, 1947.
- Тихомиров М. Н. Труды по истории Москвы. Москва, Издательство: Языки славянской культуры, 2003 — ISBN 5-94457-165-9.
