= Zhixin Building =

Building in Shandong University, China

Coordinates: 36.67425°N 117.0553°E

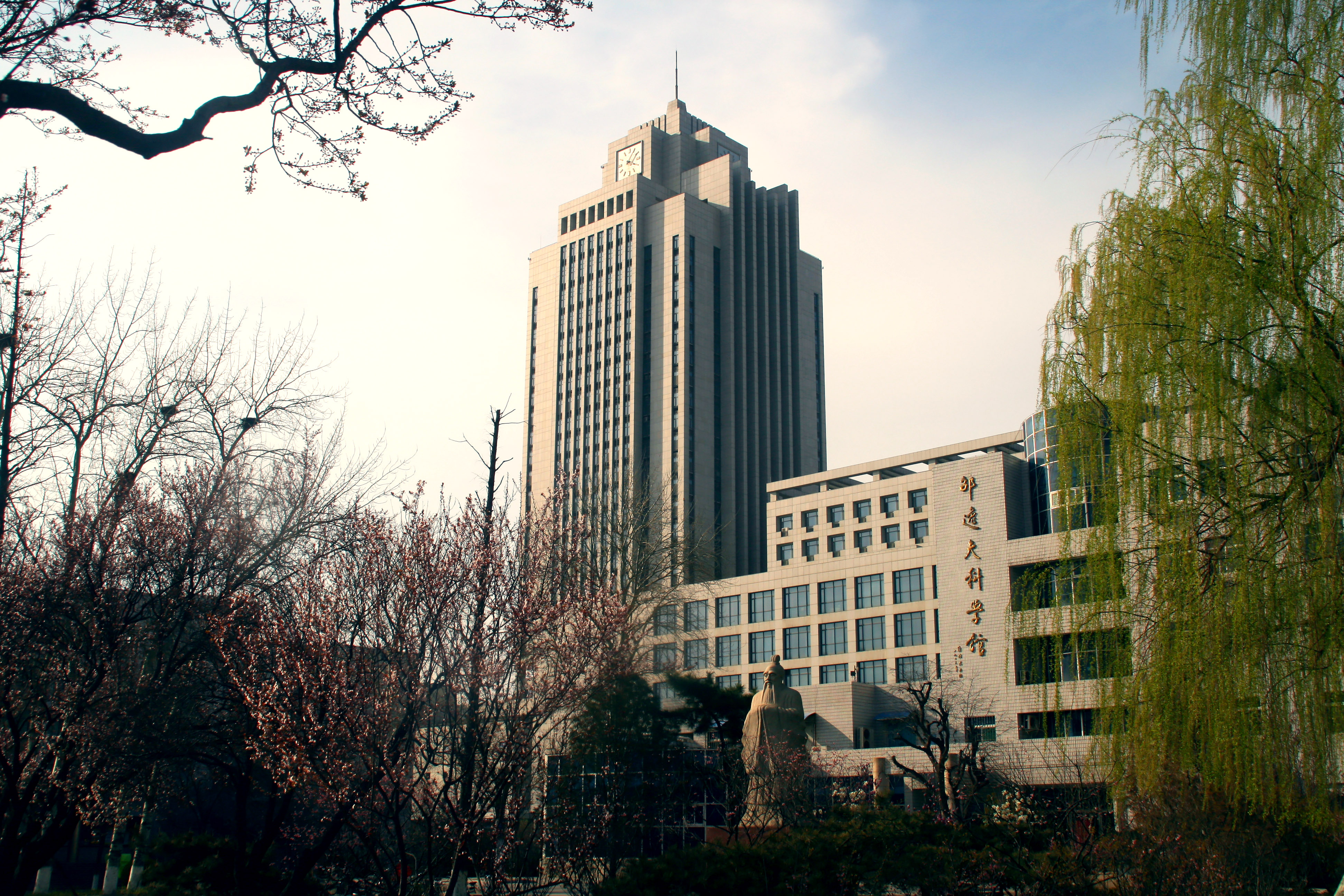
Zhixin Building seen from the southeast in March 2013.

The Zhixin Building (Chinese: 知新楼; pinyin: Zhīxīn Lóu; lit. 'know what is new building') is the main landmark building on the Central Campus of Shandong University located in Licheng District, Jinan, Shandong, China. The name of the building is derived from a passage in the Analects of Confucius that reads: "The Master said, 'A man is worthy of being a teacher who gets to know what is new by keeping fresh in his mind what he is already familiar with'." (Book 2.11, Chinese: 子曰:温故而知新，可以为师矣; pinyin: Zi yuē: Wēn gù ér zhī xīn, kě yǐ wèi shī yǐ).

The Zhixin building measures about 280 metres along its east–west axis and 90 metres along the north–south axis. It covers a total area of about 25,200 square metres and provides a total built space of 126,922 square metres. The building is divided into four blocks (Chinese: 座; pinyin: zuò), labeled "A", "B", "C", and "D". Use of the building began in December 2009 with full occupancy in April 2010.

Block A is a tower with 27 floors above ground and an underground parking garage with two levels. The tower's floors reach a total height 106.2 meters that is capped by a bell that adds an additional 30 metres in height. It provides 39,298 square metres of floor space above ground and 5310 square metres below ground. Block A houses administrative and conference facilities as well as spaces for teaching and research.

Block B has a total floor space of 40,890 square metres, of which 37,030 square metres are divided into 12 above-ground floors and the remaining 3860 square metres are in one basement floor. The total above-ground height of Block B is 52.4 metres. The basement houses a parking garage as well as technical facilities for the building and the first two floors are used for classrooms. The remaining floors are occupied by the School of Economics and the School of Management.

Like Block B, Block C has 12 above-ground floors, one basement floor and a total above-ground height of 52.4 metres. The total floor space of Block C is 21,463 square metres of which 19,520 square metres are above-ground floors and the remaining 1943 square metres below. Block C houses general-purpose classrooms (on the lower floors) as well as the School of Physics.

Block D has seven above-ground floors and one below-ground basement level. The total above-ground height of this block is 35.8 metres. Of the 19,961 square metres of built space that Block D provides, 17,084 square meters are above ground and 2877 square metres below.

The postal address of the building is: Shanda South Road 27, 250100 Jinan, China.
