= Vladimir Helfreich =

Russian architect (1885–1967)

- Владимир Георгиевич Гельфрейх
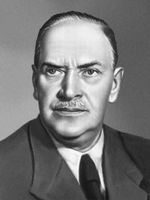
- Born: 24 March 1885; Saint Petersburg, Russian Empire
- Died: 7 August 1967 (aged 82); Moscow, RSFSR, Soviet Union
- Education: Higher Art School at the Imperial Academy of Arts
- Occupation: Architect
- Awards: Hero of Socialist Labour, Stalin Prize
- Buildings: Main building of the Russian Ministry of Foreign Affairs, Maxim Gorky Drama Theatre in Rostov-on-Don

Vladimir Georgiyevich Helfreich or Gelfreikh (Russian: Влади́мир Гео́ргиевич Гельфре́йх; * March 24, 1885, Saint Petersburg, Russian Empire – August 7, 1967, Moscow, Soviet Union) was a Soviet and Russian architect, teacher, professor.

Academician of the Russian Academy of Architecture and Construction Sciences (1947). Hero of Socialist Labour (1965). Two Stalin Prizes of the first degree (1946, 1949).

== Life ==
V. Gel'freykh was born on March 24, 1885, in Saint Petersburg in the family of a civil servant. He graduated from the real school, and studied in private drawing school for two years. In 1906, he entered the Architectural Department of the Imperial Academy of Arts, which he graduated with honours in 1914, having completed the thesis project of the building of the State Council under the supervision of Professor Leon Benois. Even while studying at the academy, he started to work in the studio of Academician Vladimir Shchuko, who had a significant influence on the further creative path of Gel'freykh.

Beginning in 1918, Gel'freykh was the permanent co-author of Vladimir Shchuko; their cooperation continued until the death of Shchuko in 1939. The first cooperation work of architects after the October Revolution was the design and construction in 1922—1923 of the pavilions of the Foreign Department of the Russian Agricultural and Handicraft Exhibition in Moscow.

During the 1920s, architects were working on projects in Petrograd – Leningrad – Smolny Propylaea, the monuments of Vladimir Lenin (near the Trinity Bridge, the Revolution Bridge and the Finland Station), the Moscow-Narva Culture House. Shchuko and Gel'freykh took part in a number of competitions, including the draft of the Soviet pavilion at the International Exhibition of Modern Decorative and Industrial Arts, the project of the Ukrainian industrial building in Kharkiv, the Palace of Labour in Ivanovo, the House of Councils in Tula, and several others.

The design of the Palace of the Soviets played an important role in cooperative activity of architects: they participated in the first and second closed competitions for the Palace project (1932–1933, co-authored with Alexandr Velikanov, Leonid Polyakov, Igor Rozhin, G. Selyugin, Selyakova-Shukhaeva, Alexandr Khryakov, Georgy Shchuko, and others). The project executed by architect Boris Iofan was adopted as a basis. Later, Boris Iofan, Vladimir Gel'freykh and V. Shchuko with their architectural team were entrusted with the subsequent development of this project (1933–1939)

In 1918—1935, Gel'freykh taught in the Leningrad Higher Artistic-Technical Institute (Russian ВХУТЕИН – Высший художественно-технический институт). He taught in the Stroganov Moscow State Academy of Arts and Industry (1959–1967). Since 1935, the architect actively participated in the General Plan for the Reconstruction of Moscow, he developed a version of the layout of the south-west of Moscow (1935–1937).

His significant work during the war years were the constructions of the third stage of the Moscow Metro—the ground vestibule and the platform of the Elektrozavodskaya station (the project of 1938, opened in 1944, co-author Igor Rozhin), the ground vestibule of Novokuznetskaya station (1943).

Gel'freykh created the project of the platform of the station "Botanical Garden" (now "Prospekt Mira", 1949, co-author Michail Minkus, sculptor Georgy Motovilov); the project of the Pantheon—the Monument to the Eternal Glory of the Great People of the Soviet Land on the Lenin Hills (1954, co-author Michail Minkus, competition).

In 1957—1958, Vladimir Gel'freykh took part in architectural competitions for the project of the Palace of the Soviets on the Lenin Hills (co-author Mikhail Minkus).

In the 1950s, he developed a project for the reconstruction of the Smolenskaya Square (together with Pavel Shteller, Viktor Lebedev, with the participation of V. Zhadovskaya and A. Kuzmin).

Gel'freykh passed away on August 7, 1967, in Moscow, and was buried at the Novodevichy Cemetery (site number 7).

== Projects and buildings ==
=== In Petrograd – Leningrad ===
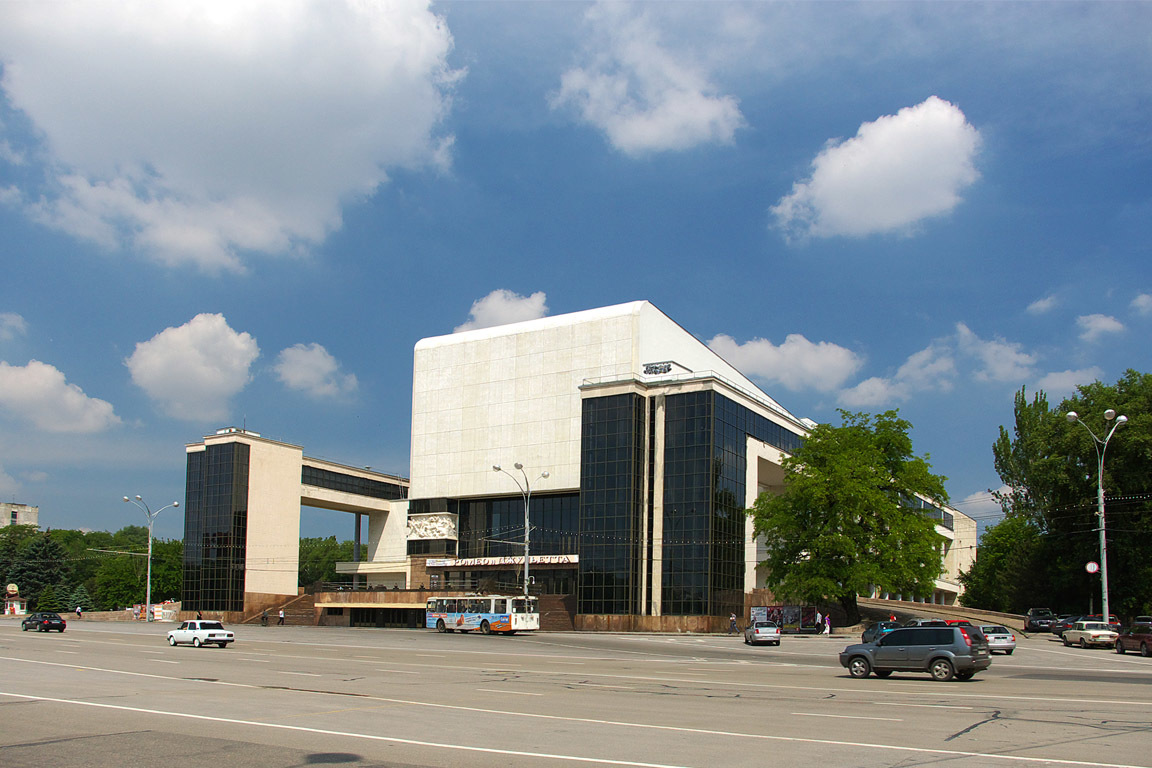
- The Maxim Gorky Drama Theatre in Rostov-on-Don
  Propylaea of Smolny (1923; co-author Vladimir Shchuko).
- Water tower for 5000 buckets in Volkhovstroy.
- Secondary lowering substations of Volkhovstroy on the Vasilievsky Island, Vyborg and Petrograd Sides (1925–1926, co-author Vladimir Shchuko)
- House of the State Industry of the USSR – Gosprom in Kharkov (1925, competition)

=== In Moscow ===
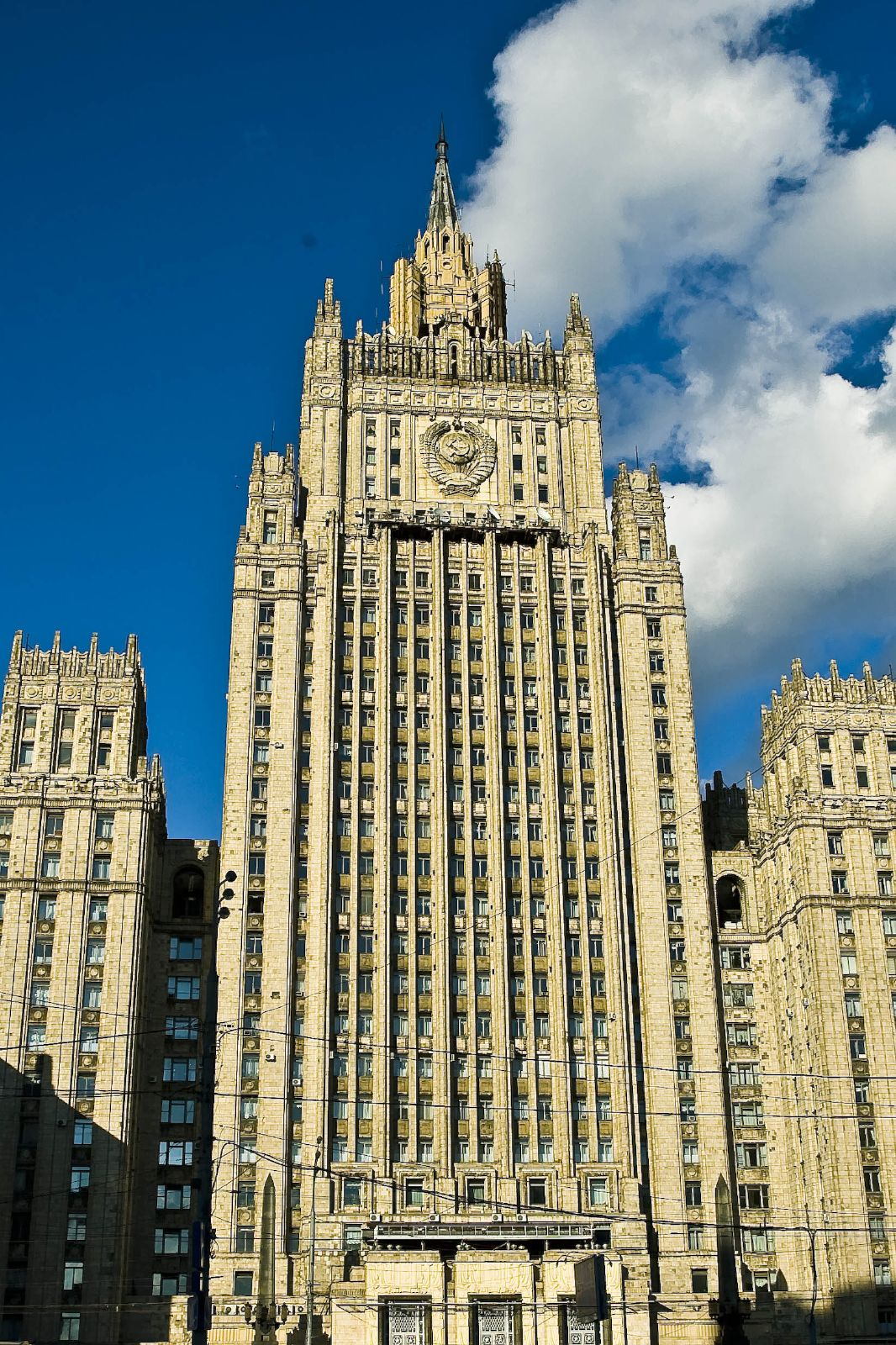
Ministry of Foreign Affairs building in Moscow, Russian Federation

- Russian State Library building (1928–1958, competition);
- House of the People's Commissariat of Industry on Red Square (1934);
- Bolshoy Kamenny Bridge (1936–1938, co-authors: Vladimir Shchuko, Michail Minkus);
- House of Justice on the Frunzenskaya Waterfront (1937, co-authors: Vladimir Shchuko, Igor Tkachenko, Igor Rozhin, competition);
- The main pavilion of VDNKh (Exhibition of Achievements of National Economy) with the tower of the Constitution (1939; co-authors: Vladimir Shchuko, Georgy Shchuko);
- Panorama of "The Storm of Perekop" (1941, co-author Igor Rozhin).
- Draft planning and development of the Smolenskaya Square (1956, together with Vitaly Sokolov, Michail Minkus, L. Varzar);

=== In other cities ===
- The Academic Drama Theatre named after Maxim Gorky in Rostov-on-Don (1930–1935, co-author Vladimir Shchuko, competition, carried out);
- Government House of the Abkhaz ASSR in Sukhumi;
- A monument to 26 Baku commissars;
- House of the State Industry of the Ukrainian SSR – Derzhprom in Kharkov (1925, competition, the project arrived later than the deadline);
- Palace of Culture in Samara (1936, co-author Vladimir Shchuko);
- Matsestinsky viaduct (co-authors: Vladimir Shchuko, Zoya Brod, A. Khryakov);
- Rzhev – restoration and reconstruction (1944–1945, co-author Georgy Shchuko);
- Khreshchatyk in Kiev (1944–1945, co-authors: A. Velikanov, I. Rozhin, Georgy Shchuko);
- Center of Stalingrad (1944–1945, co-authors: I. Rozhin, Georgy Shchuko);
- Oryol – the center of the city (1945–1947, co-authors: V. Gaikovich, Georgy Shchuko);
- The building of the regional museum and library in Birobidzhan

== Awards and prizes ==
- Hero of Socialist Labour (1965)
- Stalin Prize of 1st degree (1946) – for the architectural design of the station "Electrozavodskaya" and the upper vestibule of the Novokuznetskaya station of the Moscow Metro named after L. Kaganovich.
- Stalin Prize of 1st degree (1949) – for the architectural design of the building of the USSR Ministry of Foreign Affairs on the Smolenskaya Square
- 2 Orders of Lenin
- 3 Orders of the Red Banner of Labour
- 2 Orders of the Badge of Honour
- Medals
