= Hector Hamilton =

Hector Oliver Hamilton (died 1970) was a British-born architect working in New York City for Hamilton and Green during the 1930s. He became prominent in 1932 when the Soviet Union awarded him first prize alongside two Soviet architects for his design for the Palace of the Soviets in the second round of a public design competition, only to cancel the award without explanation a few months later. He also designed the grade II listed San Remo Towers block of flats in Boscombe, England, built between 1935 and 1938.
