= Vladimir Shchuko =

Russian architect (1878–1939)

Vladimir Alekseyevich Shchuko
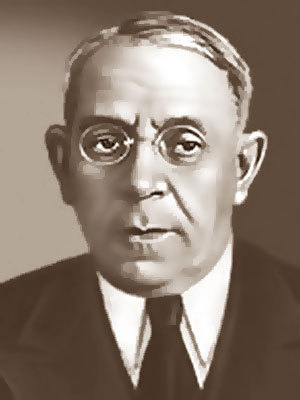
- Born: October 17, 1878; Tambov, Tambov Governorate, Russian Empire
- Died: January 19, 1939 (aged 60); Moscow, Russian SFSR, Soviet Union
- Occupation: Architect
- Practice: Schuko and Gelfreikh partnership
- Buildings: Russian State Library
- Projects: Palace of Soviets

Vladimir Alekseyevich Shchuko (Russian: Влади́мир Алексе́евич Щуко́, IPA: [ɕːʉˈko]; October 17, 1878 – January 19, 1939) was a Russian architect, member of the Saint Petersburg school of Russian neoclassical revival notable for his giant order apartment buildings "rejecting all trace of the moderne". After the Russian Revolution of 1917 Shchuko gradually embraced modernist ideas, developing his own version of modernized neoclassicism together with his partner Vladimir Gelfreikh. Shchuko and Gelfreikh succeeded through the prewar period of Stalinist architecture with high-profile projects like the Lenin Library, Moscow Metro stations and co-authored the unrealized Palace of Soviets. Shchuko was also a prolific stage designer, author of 43 drama and opera stage sets.

== Biography ==
=== Early years ===
Born in Tambov in a military family, Vladimir Schuko joined Leon Benois's class of architecture at the Imperial Academy of Arts in 1896 and graduated in 1904. His academic mentors included Vladimir Mate and Ilya Repin, and his classmates were Nikolay Lanceray, Ivan Rylsky, Alexander Tamanian and Nikolai Vasilyev; the class of 1904 was by far the strongest the Academy ever had. Shchuko's 1904 graduation project, a palace for the viceroy of the Russian Far East, was declared best in his class but had no chance of being ever built during or after the Russo-Japanese War; it was undeniably neoclassical and demonstrated uncommon ability to retain the neoclassical spirit in a design substantially larger than any preceding neoclassical buildings. Twice, in 1904 and 1906, the Academy awarded him with state-sponsored study tours of Italy; in 1901 he also travelled to Svalbard, and was frequently engaged in preservation projects at home. Shchuko was a member of the influential non-governmental Commission for Study and Description of Old Petersburg, a preservation society led by Leon Benois, and later served on the board of the Museum of Old Petersburg established in 1907. As Nicholas Roerich said in a 1939 eulogy, "He deeply understood the Russian Empire style, he loved the Italian eighteenth century. He had naturally fine taste; anything emanating from him was noble in form and function".

=== Pre-revolutionary practice ===
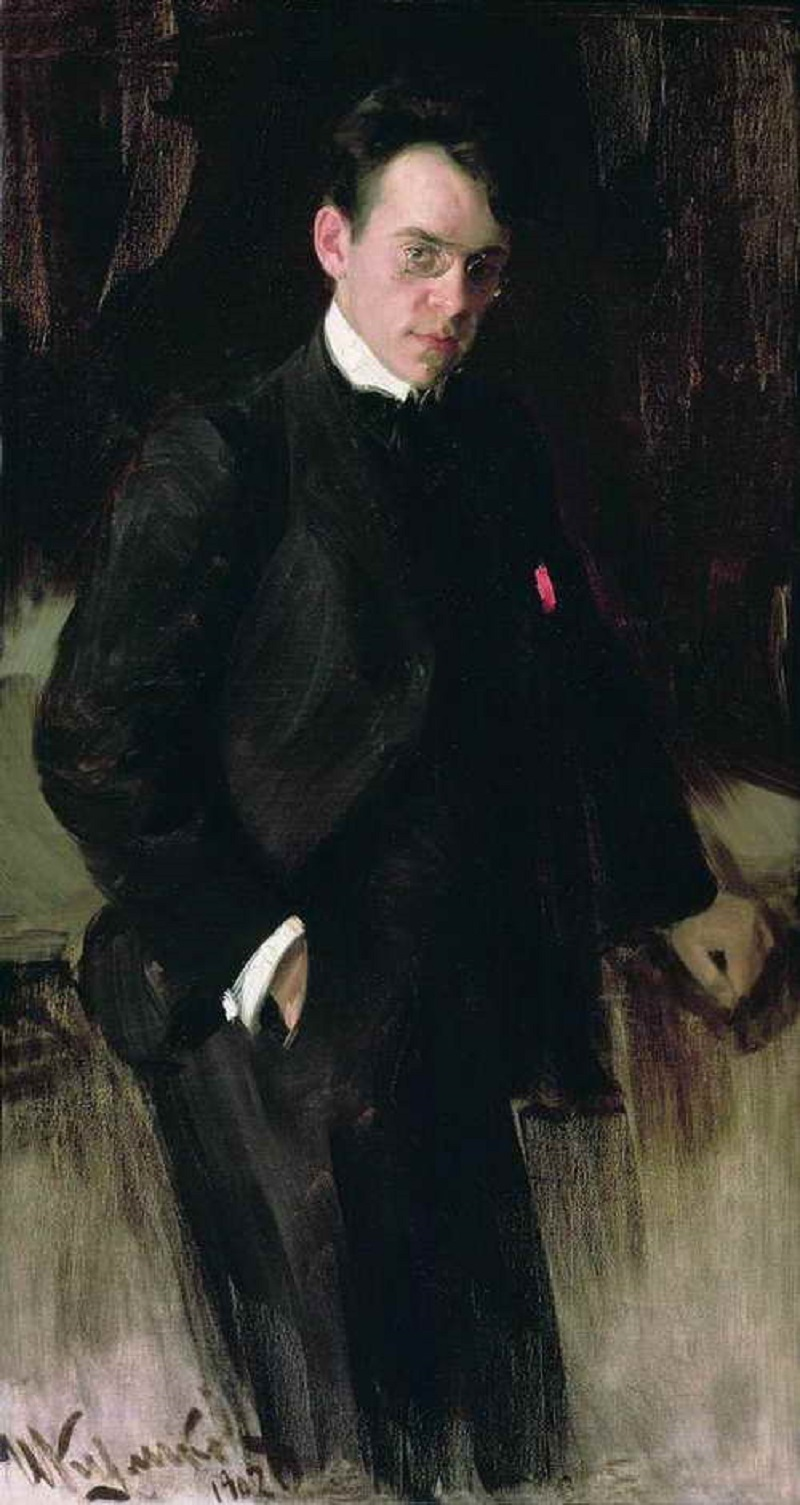
Shchuko in 1912, by Ivan Kulikov

His first real project, executed upon his return from Italy in 1907, was the facades of two adjacent apartment blocks on Saint Petersburg's Kamenny Island (Markov Buildings, 1908–1910), which became instantly popular and were copied by fellow architects and included in textbooks on Russian architecture. The first, at 65, Kamennoostrovsky Prospekt, employing his novel giant order, is still used as a reference in Russian textbooks on architecture. The building, with giant Ionic columns spanning four floors and topped with a fifth, hidden into an elaborate cornice, was based on the Italian Renaissance. Shchuko decorated a flat wall outside the main portico with loggias interspaced with carved relief, a pattern that became common in 1930s stalinist architecture. The second, at no. 63, puzzled contemporary critics as being monumental yet neither historic nor modern, "a style appropriate for contemporary urban architecture". Critics especially praised his stern treatments of windows recessed in a flat wall, another future staple of stalinist architecture. "The ramifications of Shchuko's neoclassicism appeared in many other, less obvious, forms during the retrospective phase of Soviet architecture—indeed, until the late 1950s." However, unlike his contemporary Ivan Fomin, Shchuko built little in Saint Petersburg. His other notable pre-revolutionary projects, the empire style Russian Pavilions, were built in Rome and Turin for the 1911 International Exhibition of Art and were soon dismantled.

In 1913 Shchuko began construction of the neoclassical Municipal Building in Kyiv; it was partially completed during World War I and rebuilt to Shchuko's revised draft in the 1920s. The building later housed the Communist Party headquarters in Ukraine, the Gestapo, and currently the Security Service of Ukraine. Apart from the Kyiv project, Shchuko had completed a single architectural job during the war, rebuilding the Memorial Hall at the Academy of Arts (1914–1915); another Saint Petersburg project, a bank building on Nevsky Prospect, was left unfinished.

=== Stage design ===
Shchuko's first theatrical production was made for the 1907–1908 season of the Old-Time Theatre in Saint Petersburg, followed by another season in 1911–1912 (Calderon's Purgatory of St. Patrick). Shchuko's early theatrical production departed from the modernized revivalism of Mir iskusstva as the artist settled for exact recreation of the early 19th century romanticism. Later, in 1919-1920s, Shchuko was criticized for "Schillerisation of Shakespeare" through introducing irrelevant romanticism into medieval settings.

World War I and the subsequent Russian Civil War put a hold on nearly all construction projects for a decade, yet the theatre prospered. The architect turned to theatre again, joined the board of Nikolai Evreinov's Prival Komediantov cabaret in 1916. In 1918 Shchuko and Mstislav Dobuzhinsky collaborated with the Theatre of Artistic Drama as stage designers; the company collapsed after producing Tirso de Molina's El Burlador.

In February 1919 Shchuko, Dobuzhinsky and Benois moved to the newly opened Bolshoy Drama Theatre. Shchuko landed a full-time job as the chief designer, "amazingly appearing at the right time in the right place to create the atmosphere of a 'grand style' theatre". The company, leaning towards classical works, earned cash through "lightweight" melodramas like Alexey Tolstoy's 1925 Conspiring Empress, also designed by Shchuko, that became a long-running hit. Shchuko productions of the Civil War period (1919 Don Carlos, 1920 Othello and Arvid Järnefelt's Destruction of Jerusalem) preceded the monumental stereotypes of social realism of 1930s-1940s, however, starting with the 1921 Twelfth Night he reduced the apparent size and grandeur of his stage sets. Shchuko frequently employed theatre designer Orest Allegri, famous for his inventive handling of perspective illusion. Contemporary critics rate the 1919 Don Carlos as the artist's highest mark in theatre.

In 1925-1927 Shchuko also designed a series of Der Ring des Nibelungen opera shows and a ballet at Mariinsky Theatre. After relocation to Moscow in the end of the 1920s, Shchuko collaborated with Bolshoi Theatre and Maly Theatre, producing the 1937 Boris Godunov.

=== Modernism to Stalinism ===
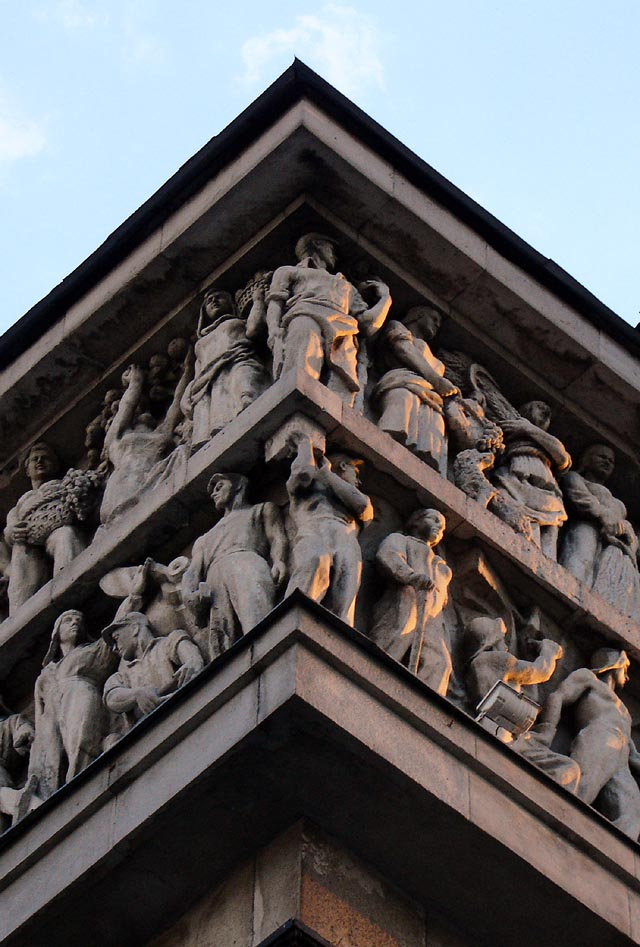
Although the Lenin Library project employed many artists, the frieze is personally credited to Shchuko.

Vladimir Gelfreikh, Shchuko's junior partner in the Soviet period, graduated from the same Academy class of Leon Benois in 1914. Their first extant practical work, the reconstruction of the square in front of the Smolny Institute, was executed in 1923–1924. In 1925 Shchuko designed the pedestal and architectural setting for Sergey Evseyev's iconic "Lenin on Top of an Armored Car" monument on the Finland Station square. The monument was clearly designed "to provide a counterpoint to the statue of Peter the Great, the Bronze Horseman". The Evseyev-Shchuko monument was the first one to establish a "canonical" image of Lenin and was widely repeated,; it turned out to be the architect's last notable work in Saint Petersburg.

The second half of the 1920s was marked by high-profile architectural contests dominated by modernist architects. Shchuko and Gelfreikh lost the Kyiv Passenger Railway Station contest to Pavel Alyoshin and Andrey Verbitsky, but in 1928 secured a winning bid on the contest to design the Lenin Library in Moscow. The initial draft comprised a complex network of low-rise buildings facing Mokhovaya Street and a π-shaped high-rise tower of the main depository at the back of the block. Construction commenced in 1930 and was substantially complete in 1941; expansions continued into the 1970s. The built structure disposed with the complexity of the original proposal; the depository, completed in 1941, is a plain 19-floor elongated slab. Among many artists involved in decorating the Library, Shchuko is personally credited for the design of the sculptural frieze facing Mokhovaya and Vozdvizhenka streets. Modern authors consider the Library, along with the Mayakovskaya station, to be Moscow's nearest approximations of Art Deco style and compare it to the 1937 Palais de Chaillot in Paris.

In 1930 Shchuko and Gelfreikh launched construction of a large (2,500 and 850 seats) opera theatre in Rostov-on-Don. The open contest to design the Rostov theatre was won by the Barkhin family partnership, but after the results were announced, Shchuko personally arrived in Rostov and persuaded the commissioners to discard the Barkhin drafts. The constructivist theater was completed in 1935, when Shchuko was working on the Palace of Soviets. An elaborate set of rotating stages provided unprecedented freedom to producers and designers, even allowing live cavalry marches on stage. Despite its award-winning exterior and plans, the theatre was never used for its intended purpose: poor acoustics rendered it useless for music, and it has not produced a single opera show. It was destroyed in World War II and rebuilt in 1963; this time, the main hall was reduced to 1,200 seats but acquired proper acoustics.

=== Palace of Soviets ===
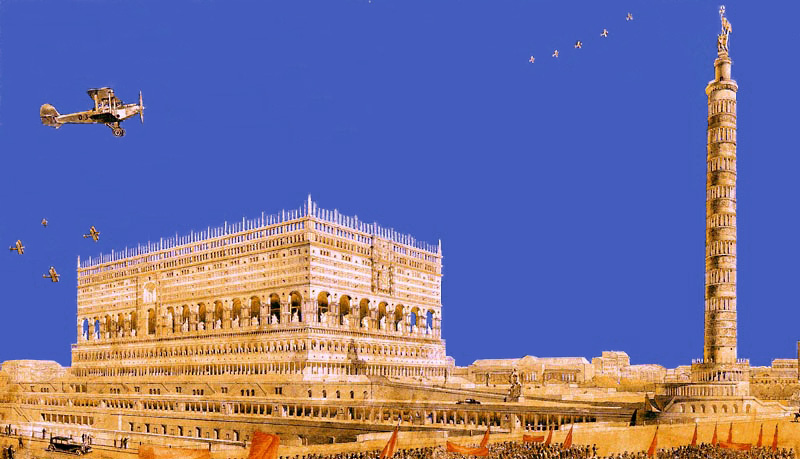
1932 draft for the Palace of Soviets

Schuko and Gelfreikh participated in the early, public stages of the contest for the Palace of Soviets (1931–1932); their best-known draft was an oversized near copy of the Doge's Palace in Venice. The last, closed, stage of the contest was won by Boris Iofan. On May 10, 1933, Iofan was announced as the winner and officially instructed to redesign his proposal so as to crown it with a gigantic, "50 to 75 meter" statue of Lenin. Four weeks later (June 4), Iofan was "supplied" with two "assistants" - Shchuko and Gelfreikh, both his seniors, and having a longer track of successful construction management practice dating from the 1900s. According to mainstream history accounts, Shchuko and Gelfreikh were appointed because the immense project had to be completed quickly, and the establishment feared that Iofan was not experienced enough to handle it alone. Modern historians like Dmitry Khmelnitsky assert that the concept was Stalin's own vision imposed through Shchuko and Gelfreikh and perfected through their expertise. All authors agree on the fact that the trio initially disagreed over the placement of Lenin's statue: Shchuko insisted on literally placing the statue on top of the main hall, as instructed by the decree, while Iofan proposed more complex solutions. Shchuko's concept prevailed. Later, former associates of Iofan and Shchuko commented about intense frictions and disarray in the early stages of their joint work; Schuko and Gelfreikh indeed imposed their vision over Iofan's, using contacts with Maxim Gorky to get a direct line to Stalin. In 1934 the trio departed for the United States to study American skyscraper technology, meeting Frank Lloyd Wright, who was well aware of Iofan's work and disliked it.

Schuko was engaged in the Palace of Soviets project until his death in 1939, and lived long enough to witness the base of the Palace erected "like a spaceship that had landed in the center of Moscow". Concurrently, he designed extant Bolshoy Kamenny Bridge (with Nikolay Kalmykov, Vladimir Gelfreikh, Mikhail Minkus), a viaduct and a city theatre in Sochi (with Gelfreikh) and the original, 1938–1939, Central Pavilion of the All-Russia Exhibition Centre.

The Moscow Metro station Elektrozavodskaya, initially designed by Shchuko and Gelgreikh in 1938 (the drafts were made public in April 1938), was completed five years after Shchuko's death. Stalin Prize for Elektrozavodskaya was awarded to Gelfreikh and Igor Rozhin, omitting Shchuko; modern references on the Moscow Metro reinstate Shchuko as one of three co-authors.

== Shchuko family ==
Shchuko was married twice. According to Tatyana Shchuko (born 1934), her father remained a religious person, despite all political assignments, until his death and did not hide his faith from the public.

- His son Boris, a theatrical designer, was arrested for counterrevolutionary charges, and managed to survive the labor camps of Ukhta. Family members were confident that the persecution of Boris provoked the architect's untimely death at the age of sixty.
- Daughter, Marina Schuko (1915–1979) was an actress trained at the Bolshoy Drama Theater college. After escaping the trap of the Siege of Leningrad in 1941, she wandered through different provincial theatres until landing a 25-year career at a drama theatre in Vologda.
- Another daughter, Tatyana Shchuko, born in 1934, also became a drama actress. She has played at Saint Petersburg theatres for 50 years since 1958 and was still active as of the end of 2008. Her most recent awards include the 2002 State Prize of the Russian Federation for the Maly Drama Theatre (Lev Dodin theatre) production of Moscow Choir.

Architect Yury Shchuko, author of the 1954 Central Pavilion of the All-Russia Exhibition Centre and a junior architect of the 1931-1932 Bolshoy Dom, was Vladimir Shchuko's first cousin once removed. Yury Shchuko, along with three other contributors, collaborated with Vladimir Shchuko on the 1936 draft of the Soviet pavilion for the 1937 World Expo in Paris. This contest was won by Iofan.

Yury Shchuko's son, Vladislav Shchuko (1942–2007), was a structural engineer and a professor at Vladimir State University.
