= Boris Iofan =

Soviet architect (1891–1976)

- Born: Boris Mikhailovich Iofan; 28 April 1891; Odessa, Kherson Governorate, Russian Empire
- Died: 11 March 1976 (aged 84); Moscow, Russian SFSR, Soviet Union
- Education: Grekov Odessa Art school, Accademia di Belle Arti
- Occupation: Architect
- Awards: People's Architect of the USSR (1970)
- Buildings: House on the Embankment
- Projects: Palace of the Soviets (never built)

Boris Mikhailovich Iofan (Russian: Борис Михайлович Иофан, [ɪɐˈfan]; April 28, 1891 – March 11, 1976) was a Soviet architect of Jewish origin, known for his Stalinist architecture buildings like the 1931 House on the Embankment and the 1931–1933 winning draft of the Palace of the Soviets.

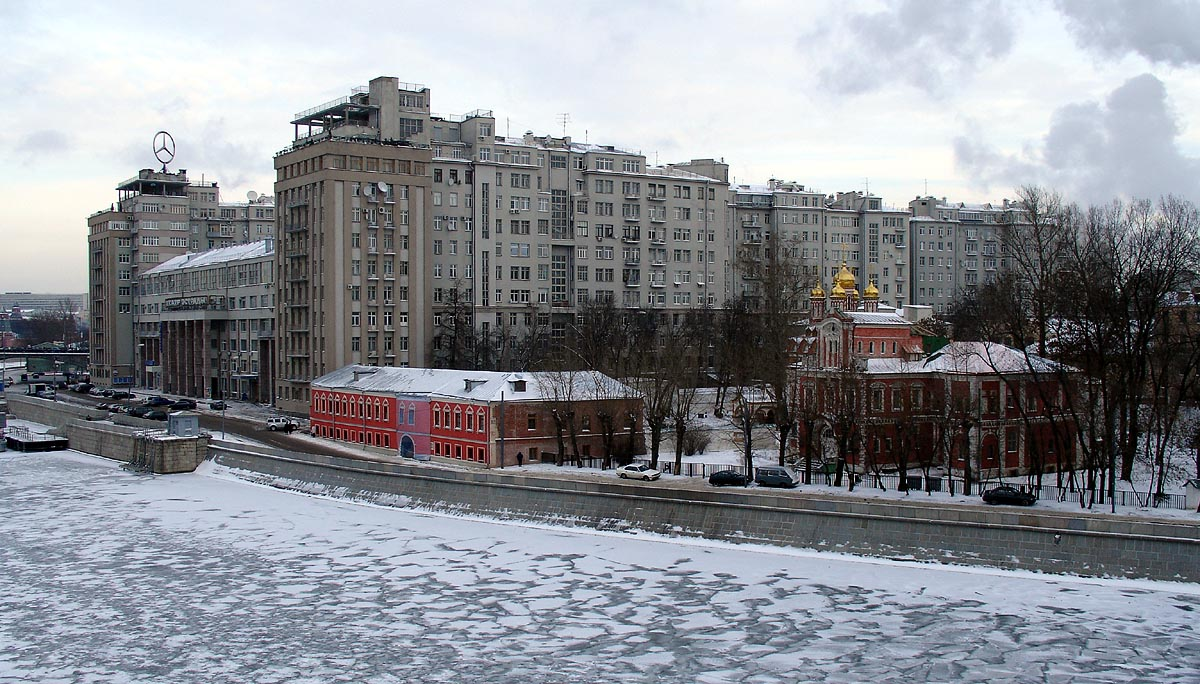
Iofan's House on the Embankment, present day

== Background ==
Born in Odessa, Iofan entered school in his home town at the age of 12 in 1903. He left for Italy shortly before the outbreak of the First World War. He graduated in 1916 from Italy's Regio Istituto Superiore di Belle Arti (now Accademia di Belle Arti) in Rome with a degree in architecture, initially following the Neoclassical tradition. His first major work was a Barvikha sanatorium for the Party elite (1929), which introduced him to clients at the top of the state.

In 1931, Iofan completed the elite block-wide House on the Embankment (official name Дом Правительства, Government Building). The structure, containing 505 apartments, two theaters and retail stores, became an iconic example of early Stalinism. Boris Iofan was a lifelong resident of this building.

== Palace of Soviets ==
Iofan's entry to the Palace of Soviets contest won in 1932 (first prize was actually split among three competing entries, but eventually Joseph Stalin awarded the job to Iofan). On June 4, 1933, the Construction Council appointed Vladimir Shchuko and Vladimir Helfreich as Iofan's co-authors. His design was awarded a gold medal during the 1937 International Exposition dedicated to Art and Technology in Modern Life in Paris. The Cathedral of Christ the Saviour, a monument initiated by Alexander I and consecrated by Alexander III, was razed for construction of the palace before the contest began. Construction proceeded slowly; in response to the Nazi invasion of the Soviet Union as part of Operation Barbarossa, construction work was halted in June 1941, at a time when the structure's steel frame stood 50 metres high. The frame was subsequently disassembled and scrapped for weapons production. In 1958, the Moscow Swimming Pool was built at the site, after construction of the palace was abandoned. This open-air pool was eventually shut down and the cathedral was rebuilt at the same location in 1994–1995.

== Later work ==
Iofan designed the Soviet Pavilions at the World Expo in Paris (1937) and New York (1939), respectively. Later, he bid for the Moscow State University skyscraper project in Moscow (1947); the job was awarded to Lev Rudnev.

== Awards ==
On October 20, 1970, Iofan was awarded the title of People's Architect of the USSR.

== Projects ==
- 1925 – Building on Rusakovskaya Street, 7
- 1927 – Russian State Agrarian University – Moscow Timiryazev Agricultural Academy, Administrative building, Kolkhoz building
- 1928–1931 – First House of Soviets of the CEC and SNK of the USSR (House on the Embankment)
- 1931 – Designing the Palace of the Soviets
- 1935 – Sanatorium of the Medical and Sanitary Management of the Kremlin "Barvikha" (now clinical sanatorium "Barvikha")
- 1937 – Pavilion of the international exhibition in Paris and the idea of the sculpture by V. Mukhina Worker and Kolkhoz Woman
- 1938 – ZiS Culture House (then the cinema and branch No. 1 of the Amo Palace of Culture "ZiL", now the Leisure Center in the Zyuzino area on Simferopol Boulevard, 4)
- 1939 – Soviet pavilion at the 1939 New York World's Fair
- 1938–1944 – Baumanskaya metro station
- 1944–1947 – Laboratory of Academician Pyotr Kapitsa
- Reconstruction and restoration of the Vakhtangov Theater
- 1947–1948 – Projects of Stalin high-rises, buildings of the Moscow University
- 1957 – Moscow Central Clinical Hospital, 15 Marshal Timoshenko Street, Kuntsevo District, Moscow
- 1962–1975 – Complex of apartment buildings in Moscow on Shcherbakovskaya Street (houses No. 7, 9, 11, co-authors D. Alekseev, N. Chelyshev, A. Smekhov)
- 1972 – Russian State University of Physical Education, Sport, Youth and Tourism (last implemented project)

== See also ==
- Stripped Classicism

== Bibliography ==
- Gary Berkovich (2021). Reclaiming a History: Jewish Architects in Imperial Russia and the USSR. Volume 2: Soviet Avant-garde: 1917–1933. Weimar / Rostock: Grunberg, ISBN 978-3-933713-63-6, p. 145.
- Deyan Sudjic (2022). Stalin's Architect: Power and Survival in Moscow. Cambridge: MIT Press, ISBN 978-0-26204-686-2.
- Vladimir Sedov (2022). Stalin's Architect: The Rise and Fall of Boris Iofan. Berlin: DOM Publishers, ISBN 978-3-86922-808-2.
