= Smolenskaya Square =

Square in Moscow, Russia

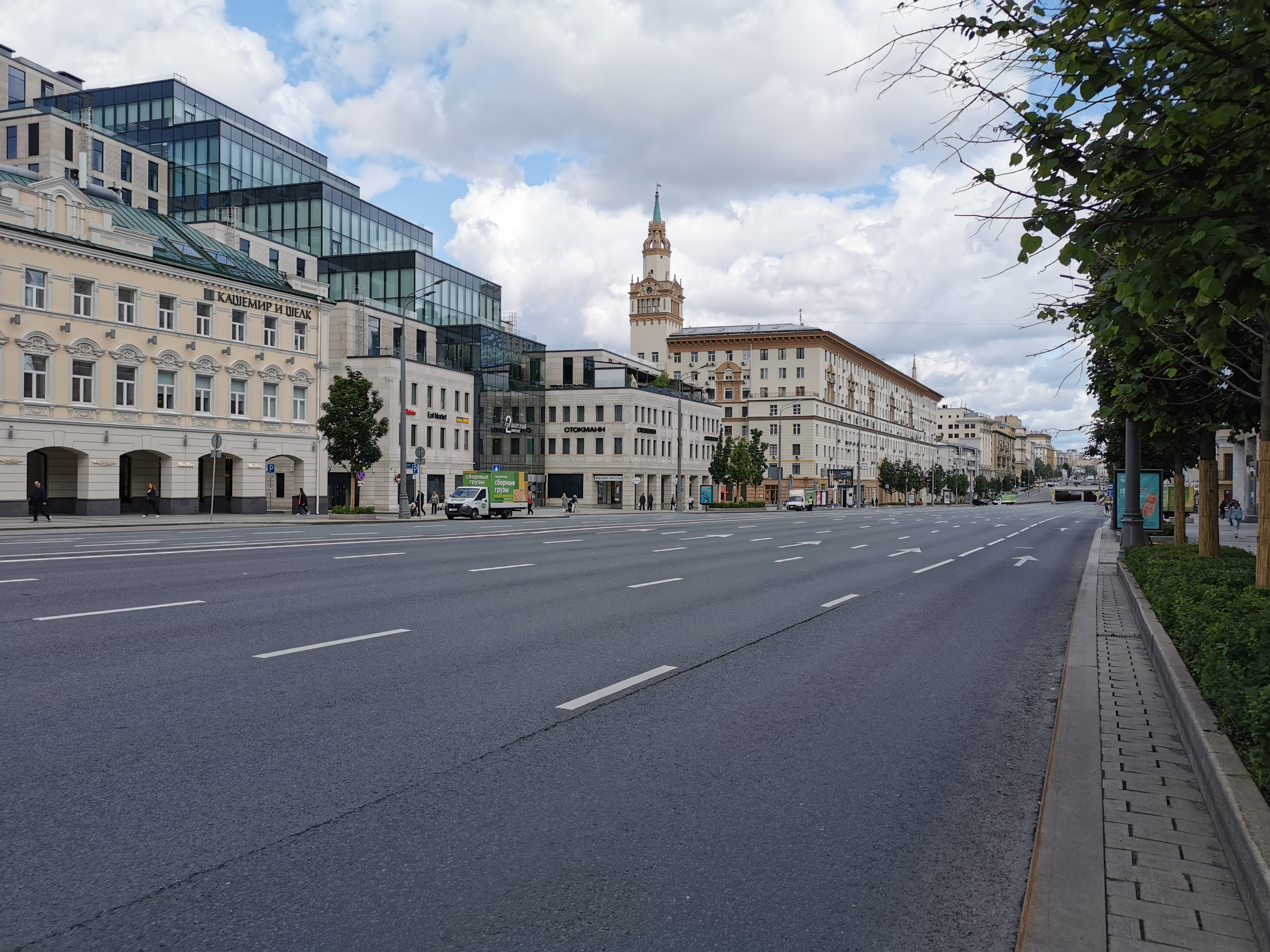
- Native name: Смоленская площадь (Russian)
- Location: Moscow; Central Administrative Okrug; Arbat District
- Nearest metro station: Smolenskaya; Smolenskaya
- Coordinates: 55.7478888989°N 37.5824722322°E

Smolenskaya Square (Russian: Смоленская площадь) is a square in the center of Moscow. The Garden Ring crosses the square. Arbat street runs towards it and ends near the Foreign Ministry skyscraper, the main building of the Ministry of Foreign Affairs of Russia. The latter faces Smolenskaya square.

The name is sometimes used as a metonym for the Russian Ministry of Foreign Affairs and the Russian foreign policy in general.
