= Ministry of Foreign Affairs of Russia headquarters =

Russian government building in Moscow

- Здание Министерства иностранных дел РФ
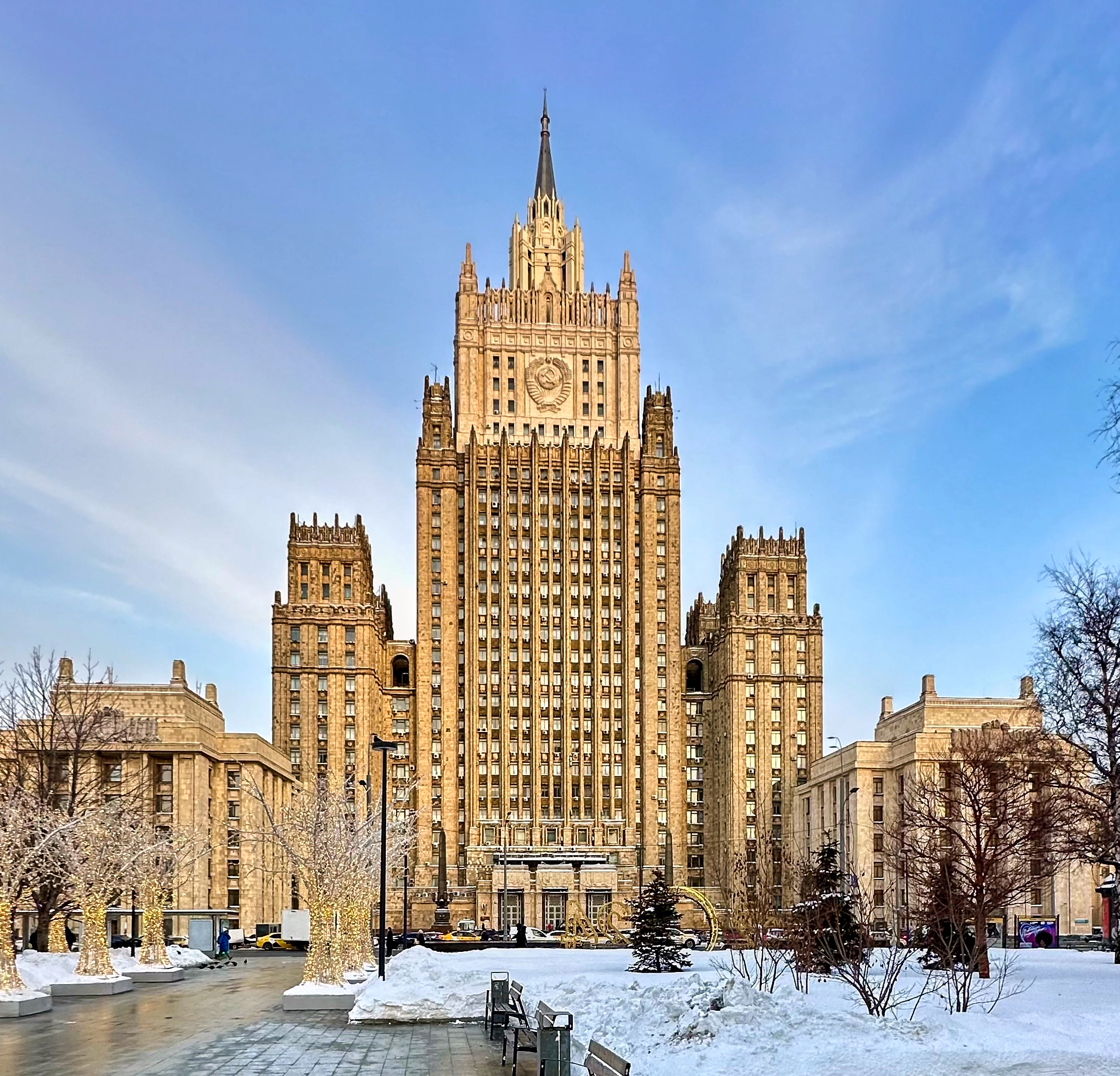
- Interactive map of the Ministry of Foreign Affairs of Russia headquarters area

General information
- Architectural style: Stalinist
- Location: 32/34 Smolenskaya-Sennaya pl, Moscow, Russia
- Coordinates: 55°44′45″N 37°35′03″E
- Construction started: 1948
- Completed: 1953

Height
- Roof: 172 m (564 ft)

Technical details
- Floor count: 27
- Lifts/elevators: 28

Design and construction
- Architects: Vladimir Gelfreykh, Adolf Minkus

The headquarters of the Ministry of Foreign Affairs of Russia is one of seven Stalinist skyscrapers (commonly known as the Seven Sisters), designed and overseen by Vladimir Gelfreykh and Adolf Minkus.

== History ==
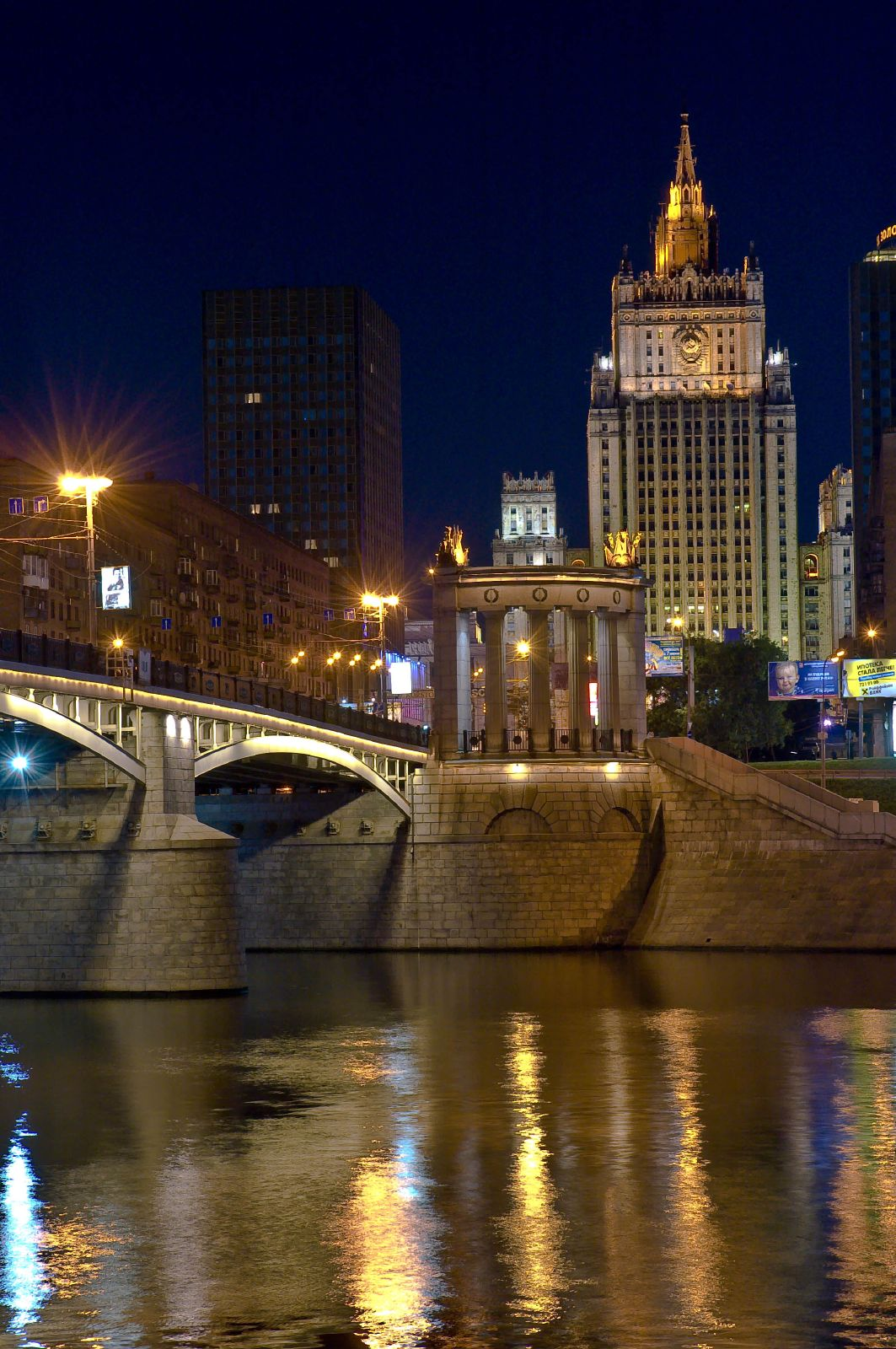
Borodinsky Bridge and the Ministry building by night

The skyscraper was laid down in 1948 and completed in 1953. According to the biography of the architect Minkus (published in 1982), draft plans were first drawn up in 1946 and ranged from 9 to 40 stories. In 1947 two designs were proposed: one utilized layered setbacks while the other called for a more streamlined construction which culminated in a blunt rectangular top. In the second and approved design a metal spire, presumably ordered by Joseph Stalin, was hastily added to the tower's roof. Currently the building houses the offices of the Ministry of Foreign Affairs of Russia.

== Architecture ==
=== The building ===
The building has been attributed similarities with the Woolworth Building in Manhattan. The architectural appearance dates back to the English Gothic: its feature is the rigid ribs that emphasise the height of the building and its upward thrust. The building has a tiered structure with the masses gradually narrowing and easing upwards. The ends of the tiers, unlike other high-rises, are flat – without towers or vases and decorated with merlons.

The central part of the building consists of 27 floors and its height is 172 metres. The plinth is clad in red granite and the façade is in light ceramic blocks. On the main façade, at a height of 114 metres, there is the coat of arms of the USSR mounted in reinforced concrete and covering an area of 144 m^{2}. The portals of the building are decorated with metal lattices and stucco made by sculptor Georgy Motovilov. The portals are flanked by large obelisks of dark grey stone. The central part of the high-rise passes into side sixteen storey wings through ledges of tiers and behind them into six storey wings. These enclosures link the massing of the building to the surrounding residential area.

=== Interiors ===
The total area of all the premises of the MFA is 65 thousand m^{2} (a cubic footprint of 402,000 m³), of which about two thousand are working and service rooms. A total of 28 lifts were installed in the building at the time of its construction, including 18 high-speed lifts.

The lobby is lined with light marble. The walls, columns, friezes on the walls as well as the floors are carpeted in polished black granite. The stained glass doors, doorframes, capitalsm, and grilles are made of brass and brass-anodised aluminium. Four escalators lead from the vestibule to the underground cloakroom.

The walls of the assembly hall, which can seat 500 people, are clad in artificial marble. The furniture and woodwork are made of Karelian birch and polished walnut, the armchairs and drapes are upholstered in red velvet.
