= List of tallest buildings in Moscow =

Skyline of Moscow
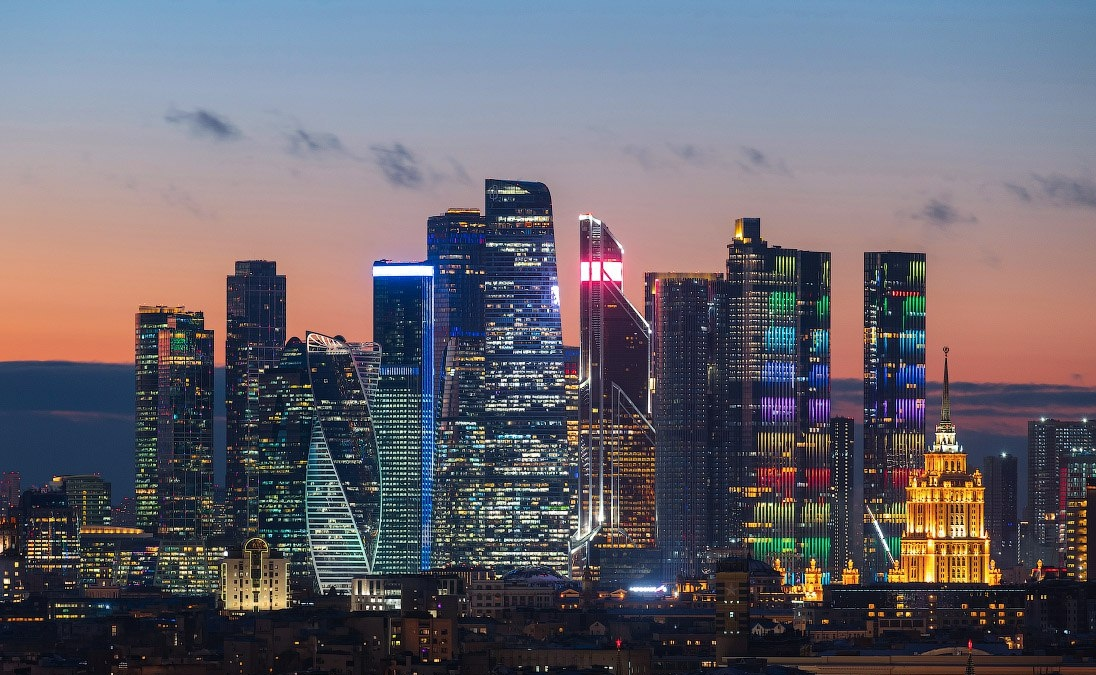
- MIBC skyline in 2025
- Tallest building: Federation, East Tower (2016)
- Tallest building height: 373.7 m (1,226 ft)
- Tallest structure: Ostankino Tower (1967)
- Tallest structure height: 540.1 m (1,772 ft)
- First 150 m+ building: Kotelnicheskaya Embankment Building (1952)

Number of tall buildings (2026)
- Taller than 100 m (328 ft): >498
- Taller than 150 m (492 ft): 108 + 36 T/O
- Taller than 200 m (656 ft): 26 + 5 T/O
- Taller than 300 m (984 ft): 6 (10th)

Moscow, the capital and largest city of Russia, is home to 12,719 completed high-rises, 49 of which stand taller than 183 metres (600 ft). The tallest building in the city is the 97-story East Tower of the Federation Tower complex, which rises 373.7 metres (1,226 ft) in the Moscow International Business Center (MIBC) and was completed in 2017. The Federation Tower was the tallest building in Europe upon its completion, and remained the tallest building until 5 October 2017 when it was surpassed by the Lakhta Center in Saint Petersburg, Russia. The second, third, and fourth-tallest buildings in Moscow are the South Tower of OKO, Neva Towers 2, and the Mercury City Tower, respectively, with OKO and Mercury City Tower also held the position of the tallest building in Europe. As of August 2026, Moscow had 144 buildings at least 150 metres (492 ft) tall.

In 1992, the Moscow government conceived the MIBC as a new business district for the city, and would culminate in becoming the center where many of Europe's tallest buildings would be built. In 2005, the Triumph Palace (not in the MIBC) surpassed the Commerzbank Tower in Frankfurt as the tallest building in Europe until almost two years later. From 2007 to 2017, skyscrapers based in the MIBC would continuously succeed each other as the tallest building in Europe (with the exception of The Shard based in London, United Kingdom from 2011 to 2012).

Several new skyscrapers that were completed since 2017 include the Neva Towers and Nebo. Skyscrapers that are under construction as of January 2021 include the Capital Towers and the Grand Tower. With six "supertall" skyscrapers above 300 m (984 ft) in height, Moscow is tied with Changsha, Hong Kong, Kuala Lumpur, and Nanning as the city with the ninth most supertall skyscrapers in the world.

== History ==
Number of skyscrapers by height in Moscow at the end of each year, including skyscrapers under construction expected to be completed in 2025. Click on the legend to toggle a specific height on or off. View chart definition.

=== Medieval and early modern period ===
During the medieval and early modern periods, Moscow's skyline was dominated by religious architecture and fortifications. The Ivan the Great Bell Tower, originally shorter, was significantly increased in height during the reign of Boris Godunov in 1600, ultimately standing at approximately 81 meters (266 ft). This tower, located within the Kremlin, was the tallest structure in Russia for many years, symbolizing Moscow's political and spiritual authority.

=== 1800s–1900s ===
Moscow's earliest notable high-rise buildings emerged in the late 19th century, with the Cathedral of Christ the Saviour completed in 1883. Standing at 103 meters (338 ft), it became the tallest structure in Moscow at that time. Designed in a neo-Byzantine style, it symbolized the Russian victory over Napoleon in 1812. However, in 1931, the cathedral was demolished under Soviet orders and replaced by the Moskva Pool, the world's largest open-air swimming pool. It was later rebuilt and restored directly at its original location in the 1990s, reopening in 2000.

=== 1900s–1920s ===
During the early 20th century, Moscow saw incremental development in vertical architecture. One of the tallest buildings erected during this period was the Metropol Hotel, completed in 1905. Located near Red Square, the Art Nouveau-style hotel stood approximately 42 meters (138 ft) tall and was renowned for its lavish design, luxurious interiors, and elaborate facade adorned with intricate mosaics.

In 1913, the Northern Insurance Company Building was completed, reaching a height of approximately 60 meters (197 ft). Featuring elements of Neoclassicism, the building was among Moscow's first modern office structures, prominently located near Tverskaya Street.

=== 1920s–1940s ===
After the Bolshevik Revolution, architectural development in Moscow took a distinctive turn toward Soviet Constructivism and early Stalinist architecture. One iconic example was the Shukhov Tower, completed in 1922. Designed by Vladimir Shukhov, this hyperboloid structure was 160 meters (525 ft) tall and served as a broadcasting tower. Its innovative design was revolutionary for its minimal use of materials and distinctive geometric form.

In the late 1930s, Stalin commissioned ambitious skyscraper projects to demonstrate Soviet power. The Palace of the Soviets was planned to become the tallest building in the world, reaching 495 meters (1,624 ft), topped with a 100-meter statue of Lenin. Construction began in 1937 at the site of the demolished Cathedral of Christ the Saviour but was halted due to World War II. Ultimately, the project was abandoned, and the foundation was later converted into the Moskva Pool, opened in 1958.

In 1935, the Hotel Moskva opened, reaching approximately 60 meters (197 ft). Designed in a Stalinist Neoclassical style, it featured prominently on Manezhnaya Square near Red Square. Its distinctive asymmetric facade became a Moscow landmark until its demolition and subsequent reconstruction in the early 2000s.

Although Moscow's skyline from the 1920s through the 1940s featured primarily low-rise buildings, these early examples of vertical architecture set the stage for the city's iconic high-rise development during the Stalinist era in the subsequent decades.

=== 1950s–1960s ===
The 1950s and early 1960s marked a transformative period in Moscow's architectural landscape, primarily defined by the construction of the Seven Sisters, a series of Stalinist skyscrapers built between 1947 and 1957. These iconic towers symbolized Soviet power and prestige. The first completed was the Kotelnicheskaya Embankment Building, the first skyscraper in Europe, followed by the Moscow State University main building, completed in 1953, standing at 240 meters (787 ft), becoming the tallest building in Europe until 1990, when it was surpassed by the Messeturm in Frankfurt, Germany. Other significant examples include the Hotel Ukraina and the Ministry of Foreign Affairs building. Their distinctive architectural style, combining Russian Baroque and Gothic elements with socialist realism, remains prominent in Moscow's skyline.

Another iconic addition to Moscow's skyline during the late 1960s was the Ostankino Tower, completed in 1967. Designed by Nikolai Nikitin, this television and radio tower reached a height of 540 meters (1,772 ft), making it the tallest freestanding structure in the world at that time. The Ostankino Tower remains the tallest freestanding structure in Europe and a significant landmark in Moscow, symbolizing Soviet technological advancement and ambition.

=== 1970s–1980s ===
During the 1970s and 1980s, Moscow saw relatively modest vertical development compared to previous decades. Notable constructions from this period include large-scale residential buildings designed in the functionalist style, which reflected Soviet mass-housing policies. Among prominent developments was the Olimpiyskiy Sports Complex, completed in 1980 for the Moscow Olympics, featuring modern architectural elements. Despite fewer landmark skyscrapers, the period set the groundwork for future urban expansions and infrastructure improvements.

In the late 1970s, Moscow embarked on creating its first purpose-built business district: the Center of International Trade (CMT), originally known as the Sovincenter or the “Hammer Center,” initiated by American entrepreneur Armand Hammer in collaboration with Soviet authorities.

== Tallest buildings ==
This list ranks Moscow skyscrapers that stand at least 150 metres (492 ft) tall, based on standard height measurement. This height includes spires and architectural details but does not include antenna masts. The list also includes skyscrapers located in Moscow’s suburban agglomeration, such as Khimki and Krasnogorsk. An equal sign (=) following a rank indicates the same height between two or more buildings; they are listed in order of year, then floor count, and then alphabetically.

Was Moscow's tallest building upon completion.
Topped out but not yet completed

Rank	Name	Image	Location	Height m (ft)	Floors	Year	Purpose	Notes	Ref.
N/A	Ostankino Tower		Ostankinsky District; Ulitsa Akademika Korolyova 15; 55°49′11″N 37°36′42″E	540.1 (1,772)	N/A	1967	Communication; Observation	Tallest free-standing structure in Russia and Europe. 12th tallest in the world. Between 1967 and 1974, it was the tallest in the world. The tower was the first free-standing structure to exceed 500 m (1,600 ft) in height. Designed by Leonid Batalov, Dmitry Burdin, Moses Shkud, Nikolai Nikitin, Boris Zlobin, and Lev Shchipakin.	
1	Federation, East Tower		Presnensky District; Moscow International Business Center; Presnenskaya Naberezhnaya 12; 55°44′59″N 37°32′16″E	373.7 (1,226)	97	2017	Mixed-use	Also known as Vostok (Russian for 'East'); 2nd-tallest building in Russia and Europe, 53rd-tallest building in the world; tallest building in Europe from 2016 until 2017; surpassed by the Lakhta Center in St. Petersburg. 14 thousand cubic meters of concrete were used for its pouring, and this achievement was even recorded in the Guinness Book of Records. Designed by Sergei Tchoban.	
2	OKO, South Tower		Presnensky District; Moscow International Business Center; 1st Krasnogvardeysky Proyezd 21с2 55°44′57″N 37°32′2″E	354.2 (1,162)	85	2016	Mixed-use	3rd-tallest building in Russia and Europe; the tallest building in Europe from 2014 to 2016, surpassed by the neighboring Federation Tower. Designed by Skidmore, Owings and Merrill.	
3	Neva Towers, Tower 2		Presnensky District; Moscow International Business Center; 1st Krasnogvardeysky Proyezd 22с2 55°45′05″N 37°32′06″E	345 (1,132)	79	2019	Residential	Tallest residential building in Europe. 4th-tallest building in Russia and Europe. Design by SPEECH architectural office with in partnership with American companies HOK and FXCollaborative, with public spaces designed by Hirsch Bedner Associates.	
4	Mercury City Tower		Presnensky District; Moscow International Business Center; 1st Krasnogvardeysky Proyezd 15; 55°45′2″N 37°32′23″E	338.8 (1,112)	75	2013	Mixed-use	5th-tallest building in Russia and Europe; the tallest building in Europe from 2013 to 2014, surpassed by OKO, South Tower. Designed by Frank Williams.	
5	Eurasia		Presnensky District; Moscow International Business Center; Presnenskaya Naberezhnaya 10с1 55°44′56″N 37°32′07″E	308.9 (1,013)	70	2014	Mixed-use	Also known as Steel Peak. Designed by Swanke Hayden Connell Architects.	
6	City of Capitals, Moscow Tower		Presnensky District; Moscow International Business Center; Presnenskaya Naberezhnaya 8с1k2 55°44′49″N 37°32′20″E	301.8 (990)	76	2010	Residential	Tallest building in Europe from 2010 to 2011. First "supertall" in Moscow and Europe. Tallest residential building in Europe from 2010 to 2011. Surpassed by The Shard in London, United Kingdom. Designed by NBBJ and Erick van Egeraat.	
7	Neva Towers, Tower 1		Presnensky District; Moscow International Business Center; 1st Krasnogvardeysky Proyezd 22с1 55°45′04″N 37°32′01″E	297 (974) or 301.9 (990)	65	2020	Mixed-use	Design by SPEECH architectural office with in partnership with American companies HOK and FXCollaborative, with public spaces designed by Hirsch Bedner Associates.	
8=	Capital Towers, River Tower		Presnensky District; Krasnopresnenskaya Naberezhnaya 14Ak1; 55°45′4″N 37°32′59″E	295 (968)	70	2023	Residential	The original height of the towers was planned to be 267 meters, but was increased to 295 meters. Designed by Sergey Skuratov.	
8=	Capital Towers, City Tower		Presnensky District; Krasnopresnenskaya Naberezhnaya 14Ak2; 55°45′5″N 37°32′55″E	295 (968)	67	2023	Residential	The original height of the towers was planned to be 267 meters, but was increased to 295 meters. Designed by Sergey Skuratov.	
8=	Capital Towers, Park Tower		Presnensky District; Krasnopresnenskaya Naberezhnaya 14Ak3; 55°45′7″N 37°32′55″E	295 (968)	67	2023	Residential	The original height of the towers was planned to be 267 meters, but was increased to 295 meters. Designed by Sergey Skuratov.	
11	National Space Center Tower		Filyovsky Park District; Myasischeva Ulitsa 1c5block3А; 55°45′44″N 37°29′37″E	288.1 (945)	47	2025	Mixed-use	Named after Valentina Tereshkova, the Soviet cosmonaut and first woman in space; the headquarters of Roscosmos. Designed by UNK.	
12	Moscow Towers		Presnensky District; Moscow International Business Center; Presnenskaya Naberezhnaya 2A; 55°45′3″N 37°32′27″E	283.4 (930)	62	2024	Office	Formerly known as Grand Tower. Designed by Werner Sobek.	
13	Five Towers		Donskoy District; 55°42′11″N 37°35′33″E	274 (899)	75	2026	Residential	Designed by Oleg Klodt, VSA studio and Leila Ulukhanli.	
14	Naberezhnaya Tower, Tower C		Presnensky District; Moscow International Business Center; Presnenskaya Naberezhnaya 10bC; 55°44′48″N 37°32′13″E	268.4 (881)	59	2007	Office	Tallest building in Europe from 2007 to 2010; surpassed by the Moscow Tower of City of Capitals. Designed by RTKL Associates and ENKA.	
15	Triumph Palace		Khoroshyovsky District; Chapayevskiy Pereulok 3; 55°47′54″N 37°31′15″E	264.1 (866)	57	2006	Mixed-use	Tallest building in Europe from 2005 to 2007; surpassed by Naberezhnaya Tower. Tallest residential building in Europe from 2006 to 2010, surpassed by the Moscow Tower of City of Capitals. Designed by Tromos.	
16	City of Capitals, Saint Petersburg Tower		Presnensky District; Moscow International Business Center; Presnenskaya Naberezhnaya 8с1k1 55°44′51″N 37°32′21″E	257.2 (844)	65	2010	Residential	Designed by NBBJ and Erick van Egeraat.	
17	iCity, Space Tower		Presnensky District; Shmitovsky Proyezd 37с2 55°45′19″N 37°31′49″E	256 (840)	61	2025	Office	The complex containing two towers was designed by a German-American architect Helmut Jahn and his firm Jahn Architecture. The atrium is designed by a German architect Werner Sobek.	
18	Evolution Tower		Presnensky District; Moscow International Business Center; Presnenskaya Naberezhnaya 4c2 55°44′54″N 37°32′30″E	245.9 (807)	55	2015	Office	Earned the 2nd place title in the Emporis Skyscraper Award 2015 competition for world's best skyscraper. It became a finalist for the 2016 MIPIM Awards and for the 2015 CTBUH Best Tall Building Awards. Designed by RMJM, Tony Kettle in collaboration with University of Edinburgh's Professor of Art Karen Forbes, and Philipp Nikandrov.	
19	Federation, West Tower		Presnensky District; Moscow International Business Center; Presnenskaya Naberezhnaya 12; 55°44′59″N 37°32′14″E	242.5 (796)	62	2009	Mixed-use	Designed by Sergei Tchoban.	
20	Moscow State University		Ramenki District; Leninskie Gory Territory 1; 55°42′11″N 37°31′51″E	240 (787)	36	1953	Educational	The headquarters of Moscow State University, and the tallest among the "Seven Sisters". It was the tallest building in Europe from 1953 to 1990, surpassed by the Messeturm in Germany. The tallest educational building in the world. Designed by Boris Iofan, Lev Rudnev, Sergey Chernyshyov, Pavel Abrosimov, Alexander Khryakov, and Vsevolod Nasonov.	
21	Imperia Tower	framless	Presnensky District; Moscow International Business Center; Presnenskaya Naberezhnaya 6с2 55°44′53″N 37°32′25″E	238.6 (783)	60	2011	Mixed-use	Designed by NBBJ.	
22	Severny Port, Tower 7.3		Levoberezhniy District; Leningradskoye Shosse 57c47 55°51′55″N 37°27′32″E	228 (748)	58	2028	Residential		
23	OKO, North Tower		Presnensky District; Moscow International Business Center; 1st Krasnogvardeysky Proyezd 21с1 55°45′0″N 37°32′4″E	224.5 (737)	49	2014	Office	Designed by Skidmore, Owings and Merrill.	
24	Level Yuzhnoportovaya, Tower 1		Pechatniki District; Yuzhnoportovaya Ulitsa 26k1 55°42′21″N 37°41′38″E	224.4 (736)	69	2026	Residential	Designed by SPEECH architectural office.	
25	Level Yuzhnoportovaya, Tower 3		Pechatniki District; 55°42′21″N 37°41′44″E	224.4 (736)	69	2027	Residential	Designed by SPEECH architectural office.	
26	House on Mosfilmovskaya, Tower 1		Ramenki District; Mosfilmovskaya Ulitsa 8; 55°43′24″N 37°31′41″E	213.3 (700)	54	2011	Residential	Arch Moscow 2005 winner. Sculpturally twisted "living snail" form by Sergey Skuratov.	
27	Hotel Ukraina		Dorogomilovo District; Kutuzovsky Prospekt 2/1с1 55°45′5″N 37°33′55″E	206 (676)	34	1957	Hotel	One of the "Seven Sisters". Tallest hotel in Russia, the tallest hotel in Europe, and the 52nd-tallest hotel in the world. It was the tallest hotel in the world from 1955 until the Westin Peachtree Plaza Hotel opened in 1976. Designed by Arkady Mordvinov, Vyacheslav Oltarzhevsky, and Pavel Krasilnikov.	
28=	MOD, Tower 7 (Dreiser Tower)		Maryina Roshcha District; Proyezd 4th Maryinoy Roschi 12k1 55°47′54″N 37°37′28″E	200 (656)	55	2025	Residential	Tallest twin towers in Moscow, along with MOD Mann Tower. Designed by Kleinewelt Architekten.	
28=	MOD, Tower 3 (Mann Tower)		Maryina Roshcha District; Proyezd 4th Maryinoy Roschi 12k2 55°47′52″N 37°37′31″E	200 (656)	55	2025	Residential	Tallest twin towers in Moscow, along with MOD Dreiser Tower. Designed by Kleinewelt Architekten.	
28=	Obrucheva 30, Tower 1		Konkovo District; Ulitsa Obrucheva 30k1 55°39′22″N 37°31′50″E	200 (656)	60	2027	Residential		
28=	Jois, Tower Anna		Khoroshevo-Mnevniki District; 55°46′26″N 37°30′26″E	200 (656)	57	2027	Residential	Designed by Andy Snow and Genpro.	
32	Will Towers, Tower 3		Ramenki District; Prospekt Generala Dorokhova 49k3 55°42′29″N 37°29′33″E	199 (653)	56	2024	Residential	Designed by Sergei Tchoban and SPEECH architectural office.	
33	Fili City, Famous Tower		Filyovsky Park District; Bagrationovskiy Proyezd 5Ak1; 55°44′32″N 37°30′35″E	198.1 (650)	57	2025	Residential	Designed by ADM architects.	
34=	Upside Towers, Elbrus Tower		Butyrsky District; Ogorodny Proyezd 4/2; 55°48′42″N 37°36′24″E	198 (650)	55	2026	Residential		
34=	Veer 1, Tower 5		Mozhaysky District; 55°42′29″N 37°26′19″E	198 (650)	59	2028	Residential		
34=	Veer 1, Tower 6		Mozhaysky District; 55°42′32″N 37°26′20″E	198 (650)	59	2028	Residential		
37	Wellton Towers, Tower 2		Khoroshevo-Mnevniki District; Ulitsa Narodnogo Opolcheniya 15k2 55°46′25″N 37°28′28″E	195.2 (640)	58	2022	Residential	Designed by Yulia Soldatenkova and A-Project.	
38	Tricolor, Tower A		Rostokino District; Prospekt Mira 188Bk3; 55°50′08″N 37°39′30″E	194 (636)	58	2015	Residential		
39	Sberbank City, Tower A		Dorogomilovo District; Kutuzovsky Prospekt 32kА; 55°44′34″N 37°31′50″E	193 (633)	47	2021	Office	Designed by Eller + Eller GmbH Architekten.	
40=	Continental		Khoroshyovo-Mnyovniki District; Prospekt Marshala Zhukova 78; 55°46′49″N 37°26′59″E	191 (627)	48	2011	Residential		
40=	D1, Kingchess Tower		Timiryazevsky District; Dmitrovskiy Proyezd 1k1 55°48′32″N 37°34′43″E	191 (627)	60	2021	Residential	Designed by KAMEN architects.	
40=	D1, Excelsior Tower		Timiryazevsky District; Dmitrovskiy Proyezd 1k2 55°48′31″N 37°34′42″E	191 (627)	59	2021	Residential	Designed by KAMEN architects.	
43	Tricolor, Tower B		Rostokino District; Prospekt Mira 188Bk1; 55°50′04″N 37°39′29″E	190 (623)	56	2015	Residential		
44	Symphony 34, Graphite Tower		Savyolovsky District; 2-Ya Khutorskaya Ulitsa 34k1 55°48′22″N 37°34′16″E	190 (623)	54	2024	Residential	Designed by Kleinewelt Architekten.	
45	Sparrow Hills, Tower 2		Ramenki District; Mosfilmovskaya Ulitsa 70k2 55°42′51″N 37°30′20″E	188.2 (617)	49	2005	Residential		
46=	Level Michurinsky, Tower 1		Ochakovo-Matveyevskoye District; Ozyornaya Ulitsa 1k1 55°41′16″N 37°28′24″E	186 (610)	54	2025	Residential		
46=	High Life, K4 Sense Tower		Danilovsky District; 55°43′29″N 37°38′48″E	186 (610)	48	2027	Residential		
48=	Will Towers, Tower 1		Ramenki District; Prospekt Generala Dorokhova 49k2 55°42′34″N 37°29′36″E	184.8 (606)	52	2024	Residential	Designed by Sergei Tchoban and SPEECH architectural office.	
48=	Will Towers, Tower 2		Ramenki District; Prospekt Generala Dorokhova 49k2 55°42′32″N 37°29′36″E	184.8 (606)	52	2024	Residential	Designed by Sergei Tchoban and SPEECH architectural office.	
50	AFI Tower		Sviblovo District; Proyezd Serebryakova 11k2 55°50′56″N 37°39′1″E	182.4 (598)	53	2024	Residential		
51=	River Park Kutuzovsky, Tower 1 (Topaz)		Dorogomilovo District; Kutuzovsky Proyezd 16A/1k1; 55°44′44″N 37°31′16″E	179.9 (590)	46	2026	Residential	Designed by ADM architects.	
51=	River Park Kutuzovsky, Tower 2 (Emerald)		Dorogomilovo District; Kutuzovsky Proyezd 16A/1k2; 55°44′42″N 37°31′20″E	179.9 (590)	46	2026	Residential	Designed by ADM architects.	
51=	River Park Kutuzovsky, Tower 3 (Diamond)		Dorogomilovo District; Kutuzovsky Proyezd 16A/1k3; 55°44′41″N 37°31′22″E	179.9 (590)	46	2027	Residential	Designed by ADM architects.	
51=	River Park Kutuzovsky, Tower 4 (Lazur)		Dorogomilovo District; Kutuzovsky Proyezd 16A/1k4; 55°44′40″N 37°31′17″E	179.9 (590)	46	2027	Residential	Designed by ADM architects.	
51=	River Park Kutuzovsky, Tower 5 (Amber)		Dorogomilovo District; Kutuzovsky Proyezd 16A/1k5; 55°44′42″N 37°31′15″E	179.9 (590)	46	2026	Residential	Designed by ADM architects.	
56=	City Bay, Indian Ocean Tower 1		Pokrovskoye-Streshnevo District; Volokolamskoye Shosse 95/2k1 55°49′50″N 37°24′13″E	179 (587)	52	2024	Residential		
56=	City Bay, Indian Ocean Tower 6		Pokrovskoye-Streshnevo District; Volokolamskoye Shosse 95/2k7 55°49′51″N 37°24′05″E	179 (587)	52	2024	Residential		
56=	City Bay, Atlantic Ocean Tower 1		Pokrovskoye-Streshnevo District; Volokolamskoye Shosse 97k1 55°49′52″N 37°23′58″E	179 (587)	53	2025	Residential		
56=	City Bay, Atlantic Ocean Tower 2		Pokrovskoye-Streshnevo District; Volokolamskoye Shosse 97k2 55°49′50″N 37°23′56″E	179 (587)	53	2025	Residential		
56=	City Bay, Atlantic Ocean Tower 3		Pokrovskoye-Streshnevo District; Volokolamskoye Shosse 97k3 55°49′49″N 37°23′55″E	179 (587)	53	2026	Residential		
61=	Sobytye-4, Tower 1		Ramenki District; Ulitsa Lobachevskogo 114Bk1; 55°41′32″N 37°28′37″E	178.4 (585)	51	2027	Residential		
61=	Sobytye-4, Tower 2		Ramenki District; Ulitsa Lobachevskogo 114Bk2; 55°41′34″N 37°28′38″E	178.4 (585)	51	2025	Residential		
61=	Sobytye-4, Tower 3		Ramenki District; Ulitsa Lobachevskogo 114Bk3; 55°41′36″N 37°28′35″E	178.4 (585)	51	2025	Residential		
64	Wave, Tower Azure		Moskvorechye-Saburovo District; Ulitsa Borisovskye Prudy 1; 55°38′14″N 37°42′21″E	178 (584)	52	2026	Residential		
65	IQ-quarter, Tower 2		Presnensky District; Moscow International Business Center; Presnenskaya Naberezhnaya 10c2 55°44′52″N 37°32′5″E	177.5 (582)	42	2017	Office	Designed by NBBJ.	
66	Wellton Towers, Tower 1		Khoroshevo-Mnevniki District; Ulitsa Narodnogo Opolcheniya 15k3 55°46′26″N 37°28′24″E	177.2 (581)	53	2022	Residential	Designed by Yulia Soldatenkova and A-Project.	
67	Sparrow Hills, Tower 1		Ramenki District; Mosfilmovskaya Ulitsa 70k1 55°42′53″N 37°30′17″E	176.5 (579)	42	2004	Residential		
68=	Kotelnicheskaya Embankment Building		Tagansky District; Kotelnicheskaya Naberezhnaya 1/15kB; 55°44′50″N 37°38′34″E	176 (577)	32	1952	Residential	First skyscraper in Moscow and Europe. One of the "Seven Sisters". Tallest building in Europe from 1952 to 1953, surpassed by the Moscow State University. Tallest residential building in the world from 1952 to 1960. First residential skyscraper. First skyscraper outside the US. Designed by Dmitry Chechulin and Andrey Rostkovsky.	
68=	Edelweiss		Fili-Davydkovo District; Davydkovskaya Ulitsa 3; 55°43′39″N 37°28′48″E	176 (577)	43	2004	Residential		
68=	Nebo, Tower 1		Ramenki District; Michurinsky Prospekt 56; 55°41′44″N 37°29′9″E	176 (577)	53	2020	Residential	Designed by "Reserv".	
68=	Nebo, Tower 2		Ramenki District; Michurinsky Prospekt 56k2 55°41′47″N 37°29′7″E	176 (577)	53	2020	Residential	Designed by "Reserv".	
68=	Nebo, Tower 3		Ramenki District; Michurinsky Prospekt 56k3 55°41′45″N 37°29′4″E	176 (577)	53	2020	Residential	Designed by "Reserv".	
68=	Rezhisser, Tower 1		Rostokino District; Ulitsa Vilgelma Pika 1; 55°50′6″N 37°38′21″E	176 (577)	49	2024	Residential	Designed by "Meerson and Voronova".	
74	Alye Parusa, Tower 4		Shchukino District; Ulitsa Aviatsionnaya 79k1 55°48′24″N 37°27′0″E	175.6 (576)	48	2003	Residential		
75	Level Nizhegorodskaya, Tower 1		Nizhegorodsky District; Perovskoye Shosse 21k1 55°44′10″N 37°44′34″E	175 (574)	47	2026	Residential		
76=	Headliner, Tower 1		Presnensky District; Shmitovsky Proyezd 39k1 55°45′17″N 37°31′27″E	174.9 (574)	53	2019	Residential	Designed by Moscow's oldest architectural bureau "Ostozhenka".	
76=	Headliner, Tower 6		Presnensky District; Shmitovsky Proyezd 39k6 55°45′17″N 37°31′33″E	174.9 (574)	53	2025	Residential	Designed by Moscow's oldest architectural bureau "Ostozhenka".	
76=	Headliner, Tower 8		Presnensky District; Shmitovsky Proyezd 39k8 55°45′10″N 37°31′38″E	174.9 (574)	53	2025	Residential	Designed by Moscow's oldest architectural bureau "Ostozhenka".	
79	Symphony 34, Crystal Tower		Savyolovsky District; 2-Ya Khutorskaya Ulitsa 34k2 55°48′21″N 37°34′12″E	173.8 (570)	49	2024	Residential	Designed by Kleinewelt Architekten.	
80	Sparrow Hills, Tower 3		Ramenki District; Mosfilmovskaya Ulitsa 70k3 55°42′53″N 37°30′23″E	172.2 (565)	42	2004	Residential		
81	Ministry of Foreign Affairs		Arbat District; Smolenskiy Bul'var 32/34; 55°44′46″N 37°35′3″E	172 (564)	27	1953	Office	The headquarters of the Ministry of Foreign Affairs of Russia. One of the "Seven Sisters". Designed by Vladimir Helfreich and Mikhail Minkus.	
82	Nordstar Tower		Khoroshyovsky District; Begovaya Ulitsa 3; 55°46′34″N 37°33′11″E	171.5 (563)	42	2008	Office		
83=	Architektor, Tower 1		Obruchevsky District; Ulitsa Akademika Volgina 2k1 55°39′24″N 37°31′19″E	169.2 (555)	47	2024	Residential		
83=	Architektor, Tower 2		Obruchevsky District; Ulitsa Akademika Volgina 2k2 55°39′23″N 37°31′24″E	169.2 (555)	47	2024	Residential		
85	Architektor, Tower 3		Obruchevsky District; Ulitsa Akademika Volgina 2k3 55°39′22″N 37°31′20″E	168.7 (553)	46	2024	Residential		
86	Jois, Tower Leo		Khoroshevo-Mnevniki District; 55°46′25″N 37°30′25″E	168.4 (552) appr.	48	2027	Residential		
87	Alcon Tower		Begovoy District; Leningradskiy Prospekt 34А; 55°47′7″N 37°34′5″E	168 (551)	36	2023	Mixed-use	The initial height of the towers was planned to be 33 floors and 150 meters, but was increased to 39 floors and 168 meters. Designed by Evgeniy Gerasimov.	
88	Sberbank City, Tower B		Dorogomilovo District; Kutuzovsky Prospekt 32kB; 55°44′33″N 37°31′53″E	167.6 (550)	41	2021	Office	Designed by Eller + Eller GmbH Architekten.	
89	Crystal, Tower 8		Khoroshevo-Mnevniki District; Ulitsa Generala Glagoleva 14Аk1; 55°46′55″N 37°27′49″E	167.5 (550)	47	2023	Residential		
90=	Swissôtel Krasnye Holmy		Zamoskvorechye District; Kosmodamianskaya Naberezhnaya 52c6 55°44′0″N 37°38′38″E	165 (541)	34	2005	Hotel	Designed by TTA and Woods Bagot.	
90=	Oruzheyniy		Tverskoy District; Oruzheynyy Pereulok 41; 55°46′25″N 37°36′19″E	165 (541)	27	2016	Office	The building’s height is officially recorded as 120 metres (394 ft) by the CTBUH, but it reaches 165 metres (541 ft) due to a decorative spire, first introduced in 2014 and installed in 2016 at the initiative of Moscow’s Deputy Mayor for Urban Development, Marat Khusnullin. Designed by Mikhail Posokhin.	
90=	Zagorye		Biryulyovo Vostochnoye District; Mikhnevskaya Ulitsa 8; 55°34′47″N 37°40′16″E	165 (541)	48	2013	Residential	Designed by Central Research Institute of Building Structures named after V. A. Kucherenko JSC "Research Center "Construction"" (TsNIISK).	
90=	Paveletskaya City, Marlon Tower		Danilovsky District; Dubininskaya Ulitsa 59Аk1; 55°43′6″N 37°38′10″E	165 (541)	46	2023	Residential		
90=	Paveletskaya City, Frank Tower		Danilovsky District; Dubininskaya Ulitsa 59Аk2; 55°43′7″N 37°38′14″E	165 (541)	46	2023	Residential		
95	MOD, Tower 5		Maryina Roshcha District; Proyezd 4th Maryinoy Roschi 12k3 55°47′48″N 37°37′29″E	164.6 (540)	44	2025	Residential	Designed by Kleinewelt Architekten.	
96	City Bay, North Ocean 8 Tower		Pokrovskoye-Streshnevo District; Volokolamskoye Shosse 95/1k8 55°49′46″N 37°24′19″E	163 (535) appr.	49	2027	Residential		
97	WellHouse na Leninskom		Obruchevsky District; Leninsky Prospekt 111к1 55°39′42″N 37°30′34″E	162 (531)	47	2010	Residential		
98	Upside Towers, Atlas Tower		Butyrsky District; Ogorodny Proyezd 4/7k1 55°48′40″N 37°36′27″E	162 (531)	46	2027	Residential		
99	Polar, Tower 1.5		Severnoye Medvedkovo District; Ulitsa Polyarnaya vl39k1 55°53′37″N 37°38′44″E	161.6 (530)	50	2027	Residential		
100	Level Michurinsky, Tower 8		Ochakovo-Matveyevskoye District; 55°41′12″N 37°28′0″E	161 (528)	48	2026	Residential		
101	Upside Towers, Monte Bianko Tower		Butyrsky District; Ogorodny Proyezd 4/7k3 55°48′43″N 37°36′34″E	161 (528)	45	2027	Residential		
N/A	Shukhov Tower		Donskoy District; Ulitsa Shukhova 14; 55°43′2″N 37°36′42″E	160 (525)	N/A	1922	Communication	Designed by Vladimir Shukhov. Tallest hyperboloid structure in the world from 1922 to 1958, surpassed by Ochsenkopf TV Tower.	
102=	Seliger City, Van Gogh Tower		Zapadnoye Degunino District; Ilmenskiy Proyezd 14k1 55°51′38″N 37°32′50″E	160 (525)	43	2023	Residential		
102=	Sydney City, Tower 2.2		Khoroshyovo-Mnyovniki District; Shelepikhinskaya Naberezhnaya 38k2/2 55°46′4″N 37°30′16″E	160 (525)	46	2025	Residential		
102=	City Bay, North Ocean 1 Tower		Pokrovskoye-Streshnevo District; Volokolamskoye Shosse 95/1k1 55°49′47″N 37°24′27″E	160 (525) appr.	48	2027	Residential		
102=	Paveletskaya City, Impulse Tower		Danilovsky District; 55°42′54″N 37°38′7″E	160 (525)	45	2027	Residential		
106	Headliner, Tower 4		Presnensky District; Mukomolny Proyezd 2; 55°45′5″N 37°31′40″E	158.5 (520) appr.	48	2019	Residential	Designed by Moscow's oldest architectural bureau "Ostozhenka".	
107	Wellton Towers, Tower 3		Khoroshevo-Mnevniki District; Ulitsa Narodnogo Opolcheniya 15k1 55°46′24″N 37°28′29″E	157.2 (516)	48	2022	Residential	Designed by Yulia Soldatenkova and A-Project.	
108	Serdtse Stolicy, Tower 1		Khoroshevo-Mnevniki District; Shelepikhinskaya Naberezhnaya 34k6 55°45′50″N 37°30′35″E	156.6 (514)	44	2023	Residential	Designed by Sergei Tchoban.	
109	Level Michurinsky, Tower 4		Ochakovo-Matveyevskoye District; Ozyornaya Ulitsa 1k2/4 55°41′16″N 37°28′16″E	156.5 (513)	45	2025	Residential		
110=	Kudrinskaya Square Building		Presnensky District; Kudrinskaya Ploshchad' 1; 55°45′33″N 37°34′51″E	156 (512)	22	1954	Residential	One of the "Seven Sisters". Designed by Mikhail Posokhin and Ashot Mndoyants.	
110=	Presnya City, Tower 1		Presnensky District; Khodynskaya Ulitsa 2k1 55°46′13″N 37°33′50″E	156 (512)	44	2018	Residential		
110=	Presnya City, Tower 2		Presnensky District; Khodynskaya Ulitsa 2k2 55°46′15″N 37°33′51″E	156 (512)	44	2018	Residential		
110=	Presnya City, Tower 3		Presnensky District; Khodynskaya Ulitsa 2k3 55°46′15″N 37°33′54″E	156 (512)	44	2018	Residential		
114=	Savyolovskiy City, Tower B2 Ellington		Butyrsky District; Novodmitrovskaya Ulitsa 2k5 55°48′13″N 37°35′28″E	155.6 (510)	47	2017	Residential		
114=	Savyolovskiy City, Tower C1 Contraine		Butyrsky District; Novodmitrovskaya Ulitsa 2k6 55°48′11″N 37°35′29″E	155.6 (510)	47	2017	Residential		
114=	Savyolovskiy City, Tower C2 Armstrong		Butyrsky District; Novodmitrovskaya Ulitsa 2k7 55°48′9″N 37°35′31″E	155.6 (510)	47	2018	Residential		
117=	Avenue 77, Tower A		Chertanovo Severnoye District; Mikrorayon Severnoye Chertanovo 1Аk1; 55°38′12″N 37°35′56″E	155 (509)	45	2009	Residential		
117=	Avenue 77, Tower B		Chertanovo Severnoye District; Mikrorayon Severnoye Chertanovo 1Аk2; 55°38′15″N 37°35′56″E	155 (509)	45	2009	Residential		
117=	Avenue 77, Tower C		Chertanovo Severnoye District; Mikrorayon Severnoye Chertanovo 1Аk2; 55°38′15″N 37°36′01″E	155 (509)	45	2009	Residential		
117=	Sydney City, Tower 3		Khoroshyovo-Mnyovniki District; Shelepikhinskaya Naberezhnaya 40k1 55°46′1″N 37°30′7″E	155 (509)	44	2023	Residential		
117=	Sydney City, Tower 5.2		Khoroshyovo-Mnyovniki District; 55°46′1″N 37°30′22″E	160 (525)	43	2027	Residential		
117=	Obrucheva 30, Tower 2		Konkovo District; Ulitsa Obrucheva 30k2 55°39′23″N 37°31′44″E	155 (509)	45	2027	Residential	Designed by KAMEN architects.	
123	Level Yuzhnoportovaya, Tower 2		Pechatniki District; 55°42′21″N 37°41′41″E	154.9 (508)	49	2027	Residential	Designed by SPEECH architectural office.	
124	Veer 1, Tower 3		Mozhaysky District; 55°42′33″N 37°26′14″E	154.4 (507) appr.	46	2028	Residential		
125	Dirigible		Obruchevsky District; Ulitsa Profsoyuznaya 64; 55°39′56″N 37°32′52″E	153 (502)	40	2013	Residential	Designed by Alexey Bavykin.	
126	Set, Tower 3		Mozhaysky District	151.8 (498) appr.	45	2028	Residential		
127=	Hide, River Side Tower		Ramenki District; 1st Setunsky Proyezd 8k1 55°43′55″N 37°32′29″E	151.7 (498)	41	2024	Residential	Designed by ADM architects.	
127=	Hide, Park Lane Tower		Ramenki District; 1st Setunsky Proyezd 8k2 55°43′57″N 37°32′28″E	151.7 (498)	41	2024	Residential	Designed by ADM architects.	
127=	Hide, West Dale Tower		Ramenki District; 1st Setunsky Proyezd 8k3 55°43′56″N 37°32′25″E	151.7 (498)	41	2024	Residential	Designed by ADM architects.	
130	Symphony 34, Silver Tower		Savyolovsky District; 2-Ya Khutorskaya Ulitsa 34k3 55°48′22″N 37°34′19″E	151.6 (497)	43	2024	Residential	Designed by Kleinewelt Architekten.	
131=	Gazprom Tower		Cheryomushki District; Ulitsa Nametkina 16; 55°39′32″N 37°33′24″E	151 (495)	35	1995	Office	First skyscraper in post-Soviet states after dissolution of the Soviet Union. Designed by Vladimir Khavin.	
131=	Level Zvenigorodskaya, Tower 2		Khoroshyovo-Mnyovniki District	151 (495)	48	2028	Residential		
133=	Paveletskaya City, Viv'en Tower		Danilovsky District; Dubininskaya Ulitsa 59Bk1; 55°43′3″N 37°38′12″E	150.6 (494) appr.	42	2025	Residential		
133=	Wave, Tower Indigo		Moskvorechye-Saburovo District; 55°38′15″N 37°42′25″E	150.6 (494) appr.	44	2026	Residential		
135=	Zilart, Tower 9		Danilovsky District; Bul'var Brat'yev Vesninykh 1; 55°41′56″N 37°38′27″E	150 (492)	40	2023	Residential	Designed by SPEECH architectural office.	
135=	iCity, Time Tower		Presnensky District; Ulitsa Yermakova Roscha 1с1 55°45′17″N 37°31′50″E	150 (492)	34	2025	Office	The complex containing two towers was designed by a German-American architect Helmut Jahn and his firm Jahn Architecture. The atrium is designed by a German architect Werner Sobek.	
135=	Sky Garden, Tower 1.1		Pokrovskoye-Streshnevo District; Stroitelny Drive 9k9 55°50′12″N 37°25′19″E	150 (492)	43	2025	Residential	Designed by Ginsburg Architects.	
135=	Sky Garden, Tower 1.2		Pokrovskoye-Streshnevo District; Stroitelny Drive 9; 55°50′13″N 37°25′24″E	150 (492)	43	2025	Residential	Designed by Ginsburg Architects.	
135=	Zilart, Mark Tower 1		Danilovsky District; 55°41′20″N 37°38′2″E	150 (492)	43	2027	Residential	Designed by UNK.	
135=	Sky Garden, Tower 2.1		Pokrovskoye-Streshnevo District; 55°50′9″N 37°25′27″E	150 (492)	44	2027	Residential	Designed by Ginsburg Architects.	
135=	Sky Garden, Tower 2.2		Pokrovskoye-Streshnevo District; 55°50′7″N 37°25′24″E	150 (492)	44	2027	Residential	Designed by Ginsburg Architects.	
135=	Sky Garden, Tower 3		Pokrovskoye-Streshnevo District; 55°50′7″N 37°25′20″E	150 (492)	44	2027	Residential	Designed by Ginsburg Architects.	
135=	Slava, Tower F		Begovoy District; 55°46′52″N 37°34′55″E	150 (492)	43	2027	Residential		
135=	Zilart, Tower 21-3		Danilovsky District	150 (492)	43	2027	Residential		

== Tallest under construction or proposed ==
This lists buildings that are proposed, approved, and under construction in Moscow and are planned to rise at least 150 metres (492 ft).

Rank	Name	Image	Location	Height m (ft)	Floors	Year	Purpose	Notes	Ref.
1	Tower on Antonova-Ovseyenko		Presnensky District	450 (1,476) appr.	95	2033	Residential	Under construction. Future tallest residential building in Russia and Europe.	
2	Wildberries Tower		Presnensky District; Moscow International Business Center; Krasnopresnenskaya Embankment 16с1 55°44′54″N 37°32′38″E	439.7 (1,443)	80	2030	Office	Under construction. Future tallest building in Moscow.	
3	Aurus, Tower 1		Presnensky District	394.6 (1,295)	96	2031	Mixed-use	Under construction. Future tallest residential building in Russia and Europe.	
4	One Tower		Presnensky District; Moscow International Business Center; 1st Krasnogvardeysky Proyezd 13; 55°45′5″N 37°32′23″E	379 (1,243)	91	2030	Mixed-use	Under construction	
5	Aurus, Tower 2		Presnensky District	343.6 (1,127)	85	2031	Mixed-use	Under construction	
6	Dom Dau		Presnensky District; Moscow International Business Center; Krasnopresnenskaya Embankment 14с3 55°45′9″N 37°32′37″E	340 (1,115)	87	2028	Residential	Under construction. Future tallest residential building in Russia and Europe.	
7	Fenomen goroda office tower 1		Fili‑Davydkovo	333 (1 ,093)	70	2031	Office	Under construction	
8	Slava, Tower 5		Tverskoy District	329.8 (1,082)	67	2030	Mixed-use	Approved	
9	Top Tower		Presnensky District	303 (994)	64	2029	Office	Under construction	
10	TPU Park Pobedy, Residential Tower		Dorogomilovo District; Kutuzovsky Prospekt	300 (984)	-	-	Residential	Approved	
11	Stone Sky Khodynka, Tower F1		Khoroshyovsky District	255 (837)	55	2032	Office	Under construction	
12	Kutuzovskiy Prospekt, Tower 1		Dorogomilovo District	250 (820)	65	2037	Residential	Under construction	
13	Kutuzovskiy Prospekt, Tower 2		Dorogomilovo District	250 (820)	65	2037	Residential	Under construction	
14	Sezar Tower		Presnensky District	249 (817)	52	2030	Office	Under construction	
15	Level Zvenigorodskaya, Tower 3		Khoroshyovo-Mnyovniki District	240 (787)	66	-	Residential	Proposed	
16	RZhD, Tower 1			240 (787)	-	-	Office	Proposed	
17	Veer 2, Tower 3		Mozhaysky District; 55°42′25″N 37°26′18″E	237 (778)	70	2029	Residential	Under construction	
18	Vysotka na Zhukova		Khoroshyovo-Mnyovniki District; 55°47′2″N 37°29′9″E	233 (764)	49	2029	Residential	Under construction	
19	Level Yuzhnoportovaya, Tower 10		Pechatniki District	225 (738)	69	2029	Residential	Under construction	
20	Bell		Begovoy District; 1-st Ulitsa Yamskogo Polya 10А; 55°46′51″N 37°35′4″E	225 (738)	50	2029	Office	Under construction	
21	Ice Towers, Tower 1		Prospekt Vernadskogo District	224 (735)	58	2028	Residential	Under construction	
22	Kod Sokolniki, Tower 1		Sokolniki District	220 (722)	55	2030	Office	Proposed	
22	Ultima City, Tower 7		Pechatniki District	220 (722)	56	-	Residential	Proposeed	
23	Ice Towers, Tower 2		Prospekt Vernadskogo District	217 (712)	57	2028	Residential	Under construction	
24	Zilart, Tower 24		Danilovsky District	216.5 (710)	-	-	Residential	Proposed	
25	Severny Port, Tower 6.4		Levoberezhniy District	212 (696) appr.	54	2030	Residential	Under construction	
26	Era, Tower 1		Danilovsky District	210 (689)	54	2029	Residential	Under construction	
27	Nachalo		Presnensky District	210 (689)	48	2030	Residential	Under construction	
28	Level Nizhegorodskaya, Tower 2		Nizhegorodsky District	209.6 (688)	58	-	Residential	Proposed	
29	Level Nizhegorodskaya, Tower 3		Nizhegorodsky District	209.6 (688)	58	-	Residential	Proposed	
30	Paveletskaya City		Danilovsky District	206.7 (678)	56	-	Residential	Proposed	
31	Ice Towers, Tower 3		Prospekt Vernadskogo District	205 (673)	53	2028	Residential	Under construction	
32	Amber City, Tower 5		Khoroshyovsky District; 55°46′15″N 37°32′15″E	200 (656) appr.	57	2028	Residential	Under construction	
33	Dom Vysoty		Begovoy District	200 (656)	48	2030	Residential	Under construction	
34	Kutuzovskiy Prospekt, Tower 3		Dorogomilovo District	200 (656)	53	2037	Residential	Under construction	
35	Kutuzovskiy Prospekt, Tower 4		Dorogomilovo District	200 (656)	53	2037	Residential	Under construction	
36	Sezar Future		Khoroshyovsky District	200 (656)	59	2029	Residential	Under construction	
37	Upside Towers, Everest Tower		Butyrsky District	200 (656)	58	2029	Residential	Under construction	
38	RZhD, Tower 2			200 (656)	-	-	Office	Proposed	
39	Fort, Tower 1		Preobrazhenskoye District	200 (656)	-	2034	Residential	Approved	
40	Fort, Tower 2		Preobrazhenskoye District	200 (656)	-	2034	Residential	Approved	
41	Admiral		Pechatniki District	200 (656) appr.	45	2028	Office	Under construction	
42	Cityzen, Tower Mayak 3		Pokrovskoye-Streshnevo District	200 (656)	56	2029	Residential	Under construction	
43	MyPriority Presnya		Khoroshyovo-Mnyovniki District	199.65 (655)	42	2029	Office	Under construction	
44	City Bay, Pacific Tower 1		Pokrovskoye-Streshnevo District; 55°49′43″N 37°24′28″E	199 (653)	59	2029	Residential	Under construction	
45	City Bay, Pacific Tower 4		Pokrovskoye-Streshnevo District; 55°49′42″N 37°24′30″E	199 (653)	59	2029	Residential	Under construction	
46	Set, Tower 2		Mozhaysky District	199 (653)	59	2028	Residential	Under construction	
47	Set, Tower A		Mozhaysky District	199 (653) appr.	59	2028	Residential	Under construction	
48	Level Zvenigorodskaya, Tower 1		Khoroshyovo-Mnyovniki District	199 (653)	65	2028	Residential	Under construction	
49	Pole, Tower 1		Khoroshyovsky District	197.65 (648)	43	2030	Office	Under construction	
50	Indy Towers, Tower D1		Khoroshyovsky District	195.7 (642)	55	2029	Residential	Under construction	
51	Amber City, Tower 3		Khoroshyovsky District	194 (636)	55	2029	Residential	Under construction	
52	Stone Blick, Tower A		Donskoy District	193 (633)	50	2030	Residential	Under construction	
53	HideOut, Tower 1		Ramenki District	190 (623)	53	2028	Residential	Under construction	
54	Solos, Tower B		Sokolniki District	190 (623)	49	2029	Residential	Under construction	
55	Sobytye-6, Tower 1		Ramenki District	189.2 (621)	50	2029	Residential	Under construction	
56	Zilart, Tower 22-1		Danilovsky District	186.7 (613)	-	-	Residential	Proposed	
57	Zilart, Tower 22-2		Danilovsky District	186.7 (613)	-	-	Residential	Proposed	
58	Tate, Tower A		Maryina Roshcha District; 55°48′7″N 37°37′13″E	186 (610)	51	2027	Residential	Under construction	
59	Sezar City, Tower 1.3		Khoroshyovsky District	185 (607)	51	2027	Residential	Under construction	
60	Sezar Silica, Tower 2A		Khoroshyovo-Mnyovniki District	185 (607)	51	2030	Residential	Under construction	
61	Technopolis Moskva, Tower 3		Pechatniki District	182.6 (599) appr.	42	2027	Office	Under construction	
62	Jois, Tower Mast		Khoroshevo-Mnevniki District	182 (597) appr.	43	2028	Office	Under construction	
63	C5, Tower 1			181.4 (595)	48	2030	Residential	Under construction	
64	Nord Gate, Tower 1		Timiryazevsky District	181 (594)	41	2030	Office	Under construction	
65	Amber City, Tower 1		Khoroshyovsky District	180 (591)	51	2031	Residential	Under construction	
66	Kutuzovskiy Prospekt, Tower 5		Dorogomilovo District	180 (591)	47	2037	Residential	Under construction	
67	Svet		Zapadnoye Degunino District	180 (591)	52	2028	Residential	Under construction	
68	Set, Tower B		Mozhaysky District	175.4 (575) appr.	52	2028	Residential	Under construction	
69	Fort, Tower 3		Preobrazhenskoye District	175 (574)	-	2034	Residential	Approved	
70	Fort, Tower 4		Preobrazhenskoye District	175 (574)	-	2034	Residential	Approved	
71	Ultima City, Tower 2		Pechatniki District	175 (574)	51	2028	Residential	Under construction	
72	Ultima City, Tower 4		Pechatniki District	175 (574)	47	-	Residential	Proposeed	
73	Ultima City, Tower 9		Pechatniki District	175 (574)	46	-	Residential	Proposeed	
74	First Nagatinsky, Life Tower		Nagatino-Sadovniki District; Nagatinskaya Ulitsa 1	175 (574)	49	2028	Residential	Under construction	
75	Era, Tower 4		Danilovsky District	174 (571) appr.	43	2029	Residential	Under construction	
76	Zilart, Tower 23-1		Danilovsky District	172.2 (565)		-	Residential	Proposed	
77	Zilart, Tower 23-2		Danilovsky District	172.2 (565)		-	Residential	Proposed	
78	Amber City, Tower 4		Khoroshyovsky District; 55°46′15″N 37°32′10″E	170 (558) appr.	47	2027	Residential	Under construction	
79	Aurum Time			170 (558)	46	2029	Residential	Under construction	
80	Tate, Tower B		Maryina Roshcha District; 55°48′8″N 37°37′16″E	169 (554)	41	2027	Residential	Under construction	
81	Stone Grain		Obruchevsky District	165 (541)	45	2028	Residential	Under construction	
82	Ultima City, Tower 6		Pechatniki District	165 (541)	41	-	Residential	Proposeed	
83	Ramenki		Ramenki District	163.1 (535)	33	2029	Office	Under construction	
84	Cityzen, Tower Volna 6		Pokrovskoye-Streshnevo District	163 (535)	48	2027	Residential	Under construction	
85	Republic, Silver Tower		Presnensky District	160 (525)	45	-	Residential	Proposed	
86	Republic, Bronze Tower		Presnensky District	160 (525)	45	-	Residential	Proposed	
87	Admiral, Tower 1.1		Pechatniki District	160 (525)	47	2028	Residential	Under construction	
88	Solos, Tower A		Sokolniki District	159 (522) appr.	41	2029	Residential	Under construction	
89	Sydney City, Tower 6.3		Khoroshyovo-Mnyovniki District	158.12 (519)	42	2027	Residential	Under construction	
90	Set, Tower K1		Mozhaysky District; Vereyskaya Ulitsa 29/30; 55°42′33″N 37°25′56″E	156.3 (513)	38	2029	Office	Under construction	
91	Level Yuzhnoportovaya, Tower 8		Pechatniki District	154.9 (508)	49	2029	Residential	Under construction	
92	Level Yuzhnoportovaya, Tower 9		Pechatniki District	154.9 (508)	49	2029	Residential	Under construction	
93	Rakurs		Shchukino District	154.65 (507)	44	2028	Residential	Under construction	
94	Zilart, Tower 25-1		Danilovsky District	153.7 (504)		-	Residential	Proposed	
95	Zilart, Tower 25-2		Danilovsky District	153.7 (504)		-	Residential	Proposed	
96	Indy Towers, Tower D2		Khoroshyovsky District	153 (502)	43	2029	Residential	Under construction	
97	Pole, Tower 2		Khoroshyovsky District	152 (499)	33	2030	Office	Under construction	
98	Light City, Tower		Presnensky District; 2nd Magistralnaya Ulitsa 3	151.45 (497)	37	-	Office	Approved	
99	Kod Sokolniki, Tower 2.1		Sokolniki District	151.45 (497)	39	2029	Residential	Under construction	
100	Kod Sokolniki, Tower 2.2		Sokolniki District	151.45 (497)	39	2029	Residential	Under construction	
101	Izdanie Quarter		Nizhegorodsky District	151 (495)	43	2030	Residential	Under construction	
102	Jois, Tower 3		Khoroshevo-Mnevniki District	150.9 (495) appr.	47	-	Residential	Proposed	
103	Amber City, Tower 2		Khoroshyovsky District	150 (492)	41	2030	Residential	Under construction	
104	Amber City, Tower 6		Khoroshyovsky District	150 (492)	41	2029	Residential	Under construction	
105	Sever			150 (492)	35	2027	Office	Under construction	
106	Krylatskaya, 33			150 (492)	43	2027	Residential	Under construction	
107	Zilart, Tower 21-1		Danilovsky District	150 (492)	43	2027	Residential	Under construction	
108	Zilart, Tower 21-2		Danilovsky District	150 (492)	43	2027	Residential	Under construction	
109	Danilovskij ot granel, Tower 1		Danilovsky District	150 (492)	45	2030	Residential	Under construction	
110	Lot		Danilovsky District	150 (492)	44	2029	Residential	Under construction	
111	Alia		Pokrovskoye-Streshnevo District	150 (492)	42	2028	Residential	Under construction	
112	Nexus		Kuntsevo District	150 (492)	46	2029	Residential	Under construction	
113	Korp		Kuntsevo District	150 (492)	40	2029	Office	Under construction	
114	Nova, Tower 1		Ramenki District	150 (492)	40	2029	Residential	Under construction	
115	Nova, Tower 2		Ramenki District	150 (492)	40	2029	Residential	Under construction	
116	Nova, Tower 3		Ramenki District	150 (492)	40	2029	Residential	Under construction	
117	Nova, Tower 4		Ramenki District	150 (492)	40	2029	Residential	Under construction	
118	Sky Garden, Tower 4		Pokrovskoye-Streshnevo District	150 (492)	44	2027	Residential	Under construction	
119	Moments, Tower 2.3		Shchukino District	150 (492)	45	2027	Residential	Under construction	
120	Aura, Silver Tower		Danilovsky District	150 (492) appr.	41	2027	Residential	Under construction	
121	Aura, Bronze Tower		Danilovsky District	150 (492)	42	2027	Residential	Under construction	
122	Mons Quarter, Tower 1		Butyrsky District	150 (492)	45	-	Residential	Proposed	
123	Ultima City, Tower 1		Pechatniki District	150 (492)	44	2028	Residential	Under construction	
124	Indivo, Tower 1		Kuntsevo District; Ulitsa Ivana Franko	150 (492)	44	2028	Residential	Under construction	
125	Gerzen Quarter, Tower 1		Biryulyovo Vostochnoye District	-	58	-	Residential	Proposed	
126	Gerzen Quarter, Tower 2		Biryulyovo Vostochnoye District	-	46	-	Residential	Proposed	
127	Gerzen Quarter, Tower 3		Biryulyovo Vostochnoye District	-	46	-	Residential	Proposed	
128	Level Seligerskaya, Tower 3		Zapadnoye Degunino District	-	48	-	Residential	Proposed	
129	MyPriority Dubrovka, Tower 1			-	61	-	Residential	Proposed	
130	MyPriority Dubrovka, Tower 2			-	54	-	Residential	Proposed	
131	Afialt, Tower 1			-	54	-	Residential	Proposed	
132	Afialt, Tower 2			-	48	-	Residential	Proposed	
134	Afialt, Tower 3			-	47	-	Residential	Proposed	

== Map of tallest buildings ==
This map shows the location of buildings in Moscow that are taller than 150 m. Each marker is coloured by the decade of the building's completion.

Buildings taller than 150 m (492 ft) in Moscow. Colours indicate decade of completion.
- 1950s and before
- 1960s
- 1970s
- 1980s
- 1990s
- 2000s
- 2010s
- 2020s
1 Federation, East Tower
2 OKO, South Tower
3 Neva Tower, Tower 2
4 Mercury City Tower
5 Eurasia
6 City of Capitals, Moscow
7 Neva Tower, Tower 1
8 Capital Towers, River Tower
9 Capital Towers, City Tower
10 Capital Towers, Park Tower
11 National Space Center
12 Moscow Towers
13 The Five
14 Naberezhnaya Tower, C
15 Triumph Palace
16 City of Capitals, S.-P.
17 iCity, Space Tower
18 Evolution Tower
19 Federation, West Tower
20 Moscow State University
21 Imperia Tower
22 Severny Port, Tower 7.3
23 OKO, North Tower
24 Level Yuzhnoportovaya, 1
25 Level Yuzhnoportovaya, 3
26 House on Mosfilmovskaya
27 Hotel Ukraina
28 MOD, Dreiser Tower
29 MOD, Mann Tower
30 Obrucheva 30, Tower 1
31 Jois, Tower Anna
32 Will Towers, Tower 3
33 Fili City, Famous Tower
34 Upside Towers, Elbrus
35 Veer 1, Tower 5
36 Veer 1, Tower 6
37 Wellton Towers, Tower 2
38 Tricolor, Tower A
39 Sberbank City, Tower A
40 Continental
41 D1, Kingchess Tower
42 D1, Excelsior Tower
43 Tricolor, Tower B
44 Symphony 34, Graphite
45 Sparrow Hills, Tower 2
46 Level Michurinsky, Tower 1
47 High Life, K4 Sense Tower
48 Will Towers, Tower 1
49 Will Towers, Tower 2
50 AFI Tower
51 River Park Kutuz., Topaz
52 River Park Kutuz., Emerald
53 River Park Kutuz., Diamond
54 River Park Kutuz., Lazur
55 River Park Kutuz., Amber
56 City Bay, Indian Ocean 1
57 City Bay, Indian Ocean 6
58 City Bay, Atlantic Ocean 1
59 City Bay, Atlantic Ocean 2
60 City Bay, Atlantic Ocean 3
61 Sobytye-4, Tower 1
62 Sobytye-4, Tower 2
63 Sobytye-4, Tower 3
64 Wave, Tower Azure
65 IQ-quarter, Tower 2
66 Wellton Towers, Tower 1
67 Sparrow Hills, Tower 1
68 Kotelnicheskaya Emb.
69 Edelweiss
70 Nebo, Tower 1
71 Nebo, Tower 2
72 Nebo, Tower 3
73 Rezhisser, Tower 1
74 Scarlet Sails, Tower 4
75 Level Nizhegorod., Tower 1
76 Headliner, Tower 1
77 Headliner, Tower 6
78 Headliner, Tower 8
79 Symphony 34, Crystal
80 Sparrow Hills, Tower 3
81 Ministry of Foreign Affairs
82 Nordstar Tower
83 Architektor, Tower 1
84 Architektor, Tower 2
85 Architektor, Tower 3
86 Jois, Tower Leo
87 Alcon Tower
88 Sberbank City, Tower B
89 Crystal
90 Swissôtel Krasnye Holmy
91 Oruzheyniy
92 Zagorye
93 Paveletskaya City, Marlon
94 Paveletskaya City, Frank
95 MOD, Tower 5
96 City Bay, North Ocean 8
97 WellHouse na Leninskom
98 Upside Towers, Atlas
99 Polar, Tower 1.5
100 Level Michurinsky, Tower 8
101 Upside Towers, Monte Bianko
102 Seliger City, Van Gogh
103 Sydney City, Tower 2.2
104 City Bay, North Ocean 1
105 Paveletskaya City, Impulse
106 Headliner, Tower 4
107 Wellton Towers, Tower 3
108 Serdtse Stolicy, Tower 1
109 Level Michurinsky, Tower 4
110 Kudrinskaya Square Build.
111 Presnya City, Tower 1
112 Presnya City, Tower 2
113 Presnya City, Tower 3
114 Savyolovskiy City, Tower 1
115 Savyolovskiy City, Tower 2
116 Savyolovskiy City, Tower 3
117 Avenue 77, Tower A
118 Avenue 77, Tower B
119 Avenue 77, Tower C
120 Sydney City, Tower 3
121 Sydney City, Tower 5.2
122 Obrucheva 30, Tower 2
123 Level Yuzhnoportovaya, 2
124 Veer 1, Tower 3
125 Dirigible
126 Hide, River Side Tower
127 Hide, Park Lane Tower
128 Hide, West Dale Tower
129 Symphony 34, Silver
130 Gazprom Tower
131 Paveletskaya City, Viv’en
132 Wave, Tower Indigo
133 Zilart, Tower 9
134 iCity, Time Tower
135 Sky Garden, Tower 1.1
136 Sky Garden, Tower 1.2
137 Zilart, Mark Tower 1
138 Sky Garden, Tower 2.1
139 Sky Garden, Tower 2.2
140 Sky Garden, Tower 3
141 Slava, Tower F

=== Moscow-City and surroundings ===
The map below shows a detailed view of skyscrapers in and around the Moscow International Business Center.

Skyscrapers taller than 150 m (492 ft) in Moscow-City and the surrounding area. Colours indicate decade of completion.
- 1950s and before
- 2000s
- 2010s
- 2020s
1 Federation, East Tower
2 OKO, South Tower
3 Neva Tower, Tower 2
4 Mercury City Tower
5 Eurasia
6 City of Capitals, Moscow
7 Neva Tower, Tower 1
8 Capital Towers, River Tower
9 Capital Towers, City Tower
10 Capital Towers, Park Tower
11 National Space Center
12 Moscow Towers
14 Naberezhnaya Tower, C
16 City of Capitals, S.-P.
17 iCity, Space Tower
18 Evolution Tower
19 Federation, West Tower
21 Imperia Tower
23 OKO, North Tower
27 Hotel Ukraina
33 Fili City, Famous Tower
39 Sberbank City, Tower A
51 River Park Kutuz., Topaz
52 River Park Kutuz., Emerald
53 River Park Kutuz., Diamond
54 River Park Kutuz., Lazur
55 River Park Kutuz., Amber
65 IQ-quarter, Tower 2
76 Headliner, Tower 1
77 Headliner, Tower 6
78 Headliner, Tower 8
88 Sberbank City, Tower B
103 Sydney City, Tower 2.2
106 Headliner, Tower 4
108 Serdtse Stolicy, Tower 1
111 Presnya City, Tower 1
112 Presnya City, Tower 2
113 Presnya City, Tower 3
120 Sydney City, Tower 3
121 Sydney City, Tower 5.2
134 iCity, Time Tower

=== Rest of Moscow ===
The maps below show the locations of skyscrapers taller than 150 m (492 ft) in Moscow outside of the maps.

Pokrovskoye-Streshnevo District
Biryulyovo Vostochnoye District
Severnoye Medvedkovo District
Skyscrapers taller than 150 m (492 ft)
- 2020s
56 City Bay, Indian Ocean 1
57 City Bay, Indian Ocean 6
58 City Bay, Atlantic Ocean 1
59 City Bay, Atlantic Ocean 2
60 City Bay, Atlantic Ocean 3
96 City Bay, North Ocean 8
104 City Bay, North Ocean 1
135 Sky Garden, Tower 1.1
136 Sky Garden, Tower 1.2
138 Sky Garden, Tower 2.1
139 Sky Garden, Tower 2.2
140 Sky Garden, Tower 3

Skyscrapers taller than 150 m (492 ft)
- 2010s
92 Zagorye

Skyscrapers taller than 150 m (492 ft)
- 2020s
99 Polar, Tower 1.5

Chertanovo Severnoye District
Moskvorechye-Saburovo District
Levoberezhny District
Skyscrapers taller than 150 m (492 ft)
- 2000s
117 Avenue 77 A
118 Avenue 77 B
119 Avenue 77 C

Skyscrapers taller than 150 m (492 ft)
- 2020s
64 Wave, Tower Azure
132 Wave, Tower Indigo

Skyscrapers taller than 150 m (492 ft)
- 2020s
22 Severny Port, Tower 7.3

== Demolished buildings ==
This lists all demolished buildings in Moscow that stood at least 328 feet (100 m) tall.

Rank	Name	Image	Height m (ft)	Floors	Year built	Year demolished	Notes	Location
N/A	Moscow Octod Tower		258 (846)	N/A	2006	2024		
1	NII Delta		137.5 (451)	25	1982	2025	Laboratory building for the Design Bureau of Semiconductor Engineering of the Ministry of Electronic Industry.	
2	Rosoboronexport Building		119.4 (392)	27	1999	2024		

== Timeline of tallest buildings ==
This lists free-standing structures that have at some point held the title of tallest structure in Moscow.

Rank	Name	Image	Location	Years as tallest	Height m / ft	Floors	Ref.
1	Dormition Cathedral, Moscow		Kremlin	1479—1508 (29 years)	55 (180)	N/A	
2	Ivan the Great Bell Tower		Kremlin	1508—1561 (53 years)	60 (197)	N/A	
3	Saint Basil's Cathedral		Red Square	1561—1600 (39 years)	65 (213)	N/A	
4	Ivan the Great Bell Tower		Kremlin	1600—1707 (107 years)	81 (266)	N/A	
5	Menshikov Tower		Basmanny District	1707—1723 (16 years)	84.3 (277)	N/A	
6	Ivan the Great Bell Tower		Kremlin	1723—1839 (116 years)	81 (266)	N/A	
7	Simonov Monastery			1839—1858 (19 years)	94.5 (310)	N/A	
8	Cathedral of Christ the Saviour			1858—1931 (73 years)	103 (338)	N/A	
9	Ivan the Great Bell Tower		Kremlin	1931—1952 (21 years)	81 (266)	N/A	
10	Kotelnicheskaya Embankment Building			1952–1953 (1 years)	176 (577)	32	
11	Main building of Moscow State University			1953–2005 (52 years)	240 (787)	36	
12	Triumph Palace			2005–2007 (2 years)	264.1 (866)	57	
13	Naberezhnaya Tower, Block C			2007–2010 (3 years)	268.4 (881)	61	
14	City of Capitals, Moscow Tower			2010–2013 (3 years)	301.8 (990)	76	
15	Mercury City Tower			2013–2015 (2 years)	338.9 (1,112)	75	
16	OKO, South Tower			2015–2016 (1 year)	354.1 (1,162)	85	
17	Federation Tower, East Tower			2016–present (9 years)	373.7 (1,226)	97	

== See also ==
- List of tallest structures built in the Soviet Union
- List of tallest buildings in Russia

== Notes ==
A. This structure is not a habitable building but is included in this list for comparative purposes. Per a ruling by the Council on Tall Buildings and Urban Habitat, freestanding observation towers, chimneys or masts are not considered to be buildings, as they are not fully habitable structures.
