= Sparrow Hills (disambiguation) =

Sparrow Hills is a hill on the right bank of the Moskva River in south-west Moscow, Russia where an observation platform, the main building of Moscow State University and parks are located.

Sparrow Hills may also refer to:

- Sparrow Hills (building), a residential complex in Moscow
- Vorobyovy Gory (Moscow Metro) or Sparrow Hills, a station of the Moscow Metro

== See also ==
- Sparrow Hill, a hill in Massachusetts
