= Sberbank (disambiguation) =

Sberbank is a Russian banking and financial services company. It may also refer to:

- Sberbank CIB, the corporate and investment banking arm of Russia's Sberbank
- Sberbank Europe Group, the former EU affiliate of Russia's Sberbank until March 2022
- Sberbank City, an office building complex in Moscow
- the Savings Bank of the USSR, branded Sberbank between 1987 and 1991
