= Swissôtel Krasnye Holmy =

5-star hotel in Moscow

Coordinates: 55.7332°N 37.6445°E

Swissôtel Krasnye Holmy Moscow
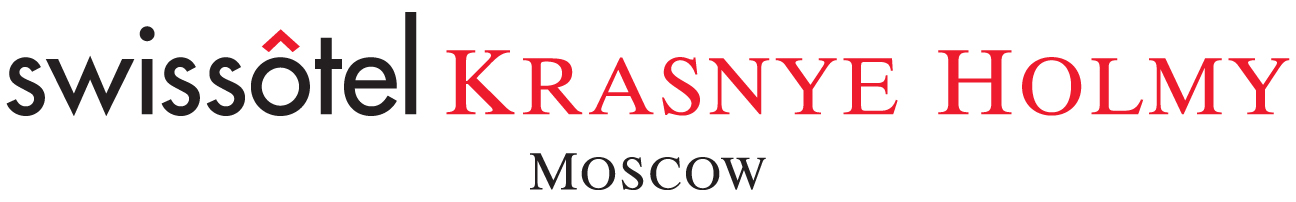

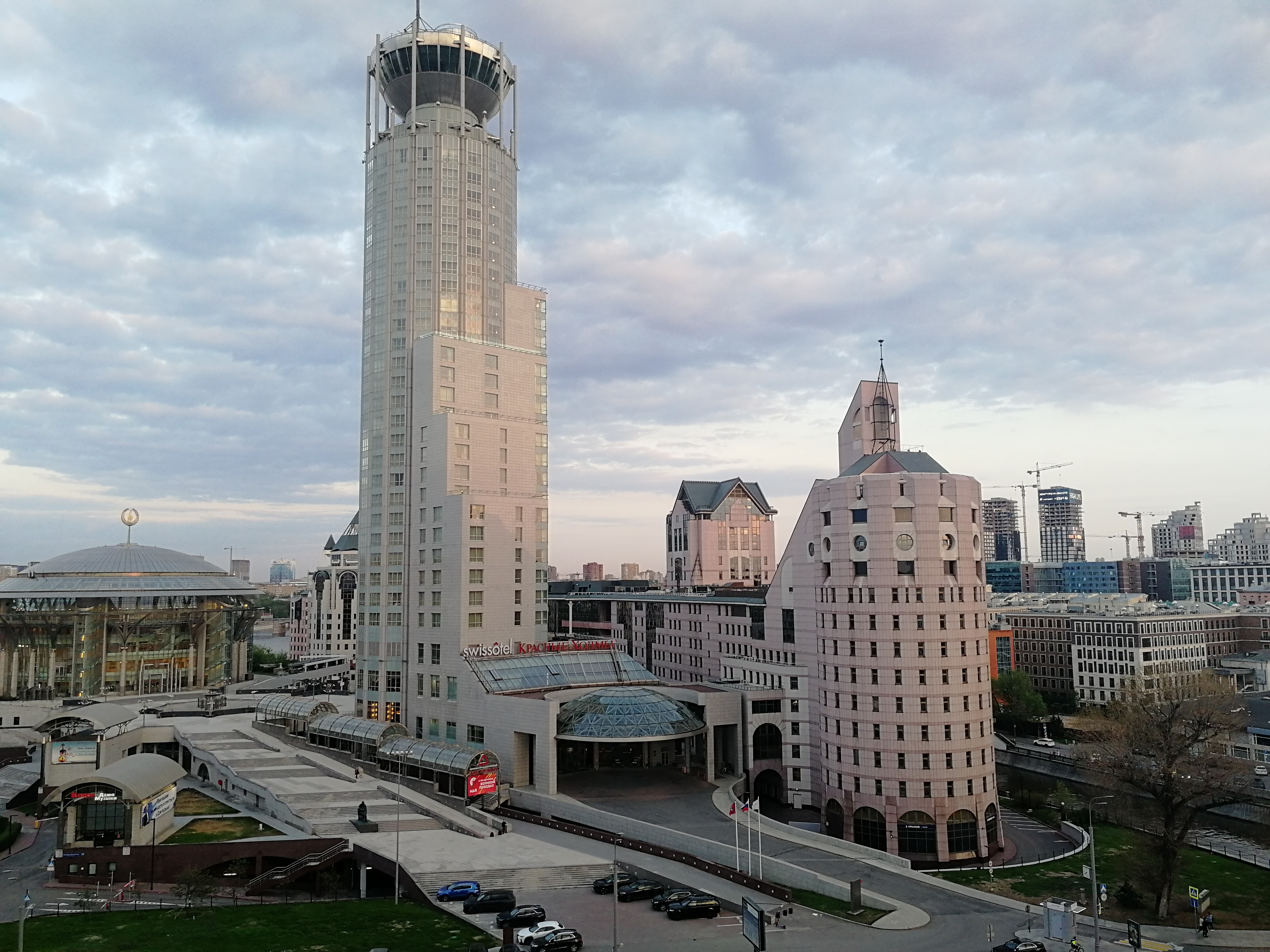

- Location within Central Moscow

General information
- Location: Moscow, Kosmodamianskaya emb, 52 bld. 6, 115054 Moscow, Russia
- Opening: July 2005
- Owner: Enka İnşaat ve Sanayi A.Ş.
- Operator: Accor

Height
- Height: 165

Technical details
- Floor count: 34

Design and construction
- Architects: TTA, Woods Bagot

Other information
- Number of rooms: 234
- Number of suites: 28
- Number of restaurants: 3

The Swissôtel Krasnye Holmy Moscow is a 5-star hotel in Moscow managed by the Swissôtel division of Accor. The Swissôtel is one of the 40 tallest buildings in Moscow.

== History ==
The idea of the hotel project began in 1995, when the OAO Moskva Krasnye Holmy was established to develop a business complex called "Riverside Towers", located on the eastern tip of the unnamed island in Zamoskvorechye. The shareholder of this joint stock company is ENKA Holding.

The hotel construction was designed by Russian architects TTA, with the participation of international architect firm Woods Bagot. For the interior design, the work of interior design company BBG-BBGM was selected.
