= ICity =

Complex of two skyscrapers being built by MR Group in Moscow, Russia

iCity Space Tower & iCity Time Tower
- iCity
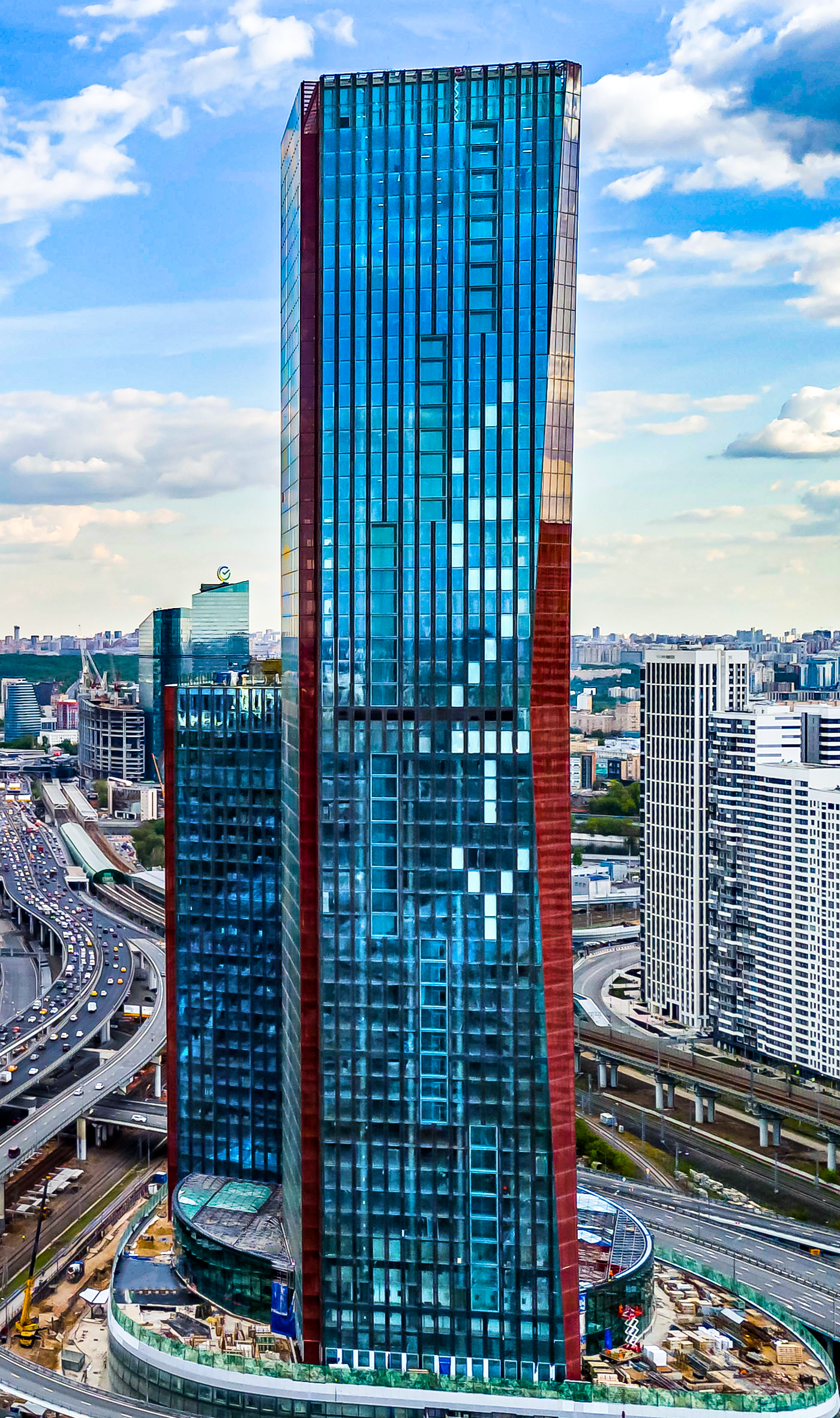
- iCity in June 2024
- Interactive map of the iCity Space Tower & iCity Time Tower area

General information
- Status: Completed
- Location: Moscow, Russia
- Coordinates: 55°45′17″N 37°31′49″E
- Construction started: 2020
- Topped-out: 2024
- Completed: 2024
- Cost: 23 bln rubles
- Owner: MR Group

Height
- Height: 256 m (Space Tower); 150 m (Time Tower)

Technical details
- Floor count: Tower 1: 61; Tower 2: 34

Design and construction
- Architect: Helmut Jahn

Website
- mr-group.ru/projects/bc-icity/

The iCity (formerly known as City One) is a complex of two skyscrapers that was built by MR Group in Moscow, Russia. The two skyscrapers are named Time Tower (34 floors; 150 m high) and Space Tower (61 floors; 256 m high). The construction was started in 2020 and completed in late 2024. The estimated cost of the project is 23 billion rubles (approx. $335 mln). In 2019, the media reported that one of Russia's largest internet companies, Mail.Ru Group, had plans to lease a third of the floor space in this complex upon completion. Upon completion in 2024, the iCity became one of the tallest buildings in Moscow and in Europe.

== Overview ==
The complex was designed by a German-American architect Helmut Jahn and his firm Jahn Architecture. The atrium of iCity is designed by a German architect Werner Sobek. A five-storey parking garage will have almost 950 spaces. The brokers are Knight Frank, CBRE, Colliers International.

== Gallery ==
Artist's impression of iCity

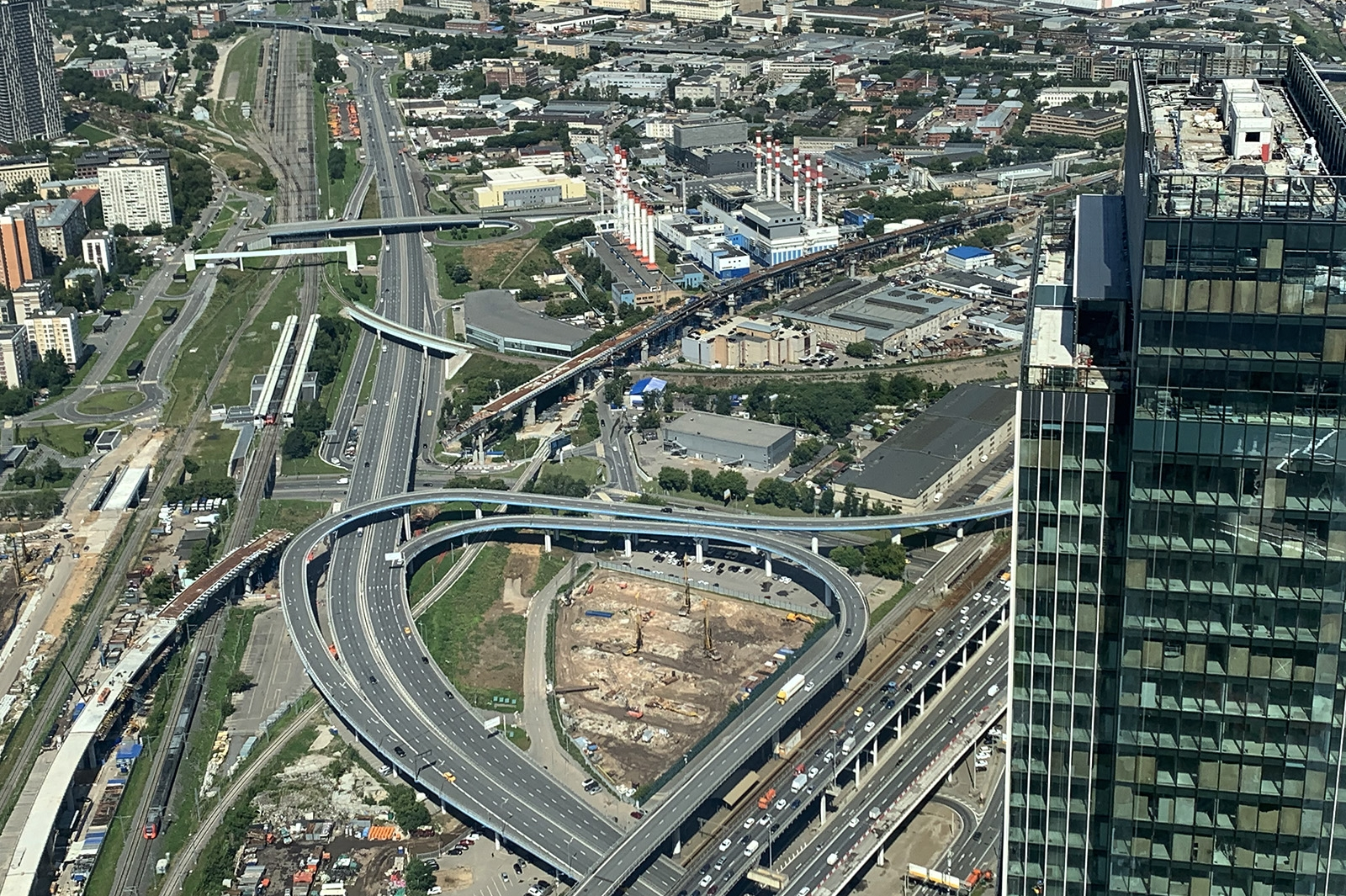
The construction site in July 2020. A distinctive feature of the skyscraper is that it will be built inside a turning overpass shown in the photo.

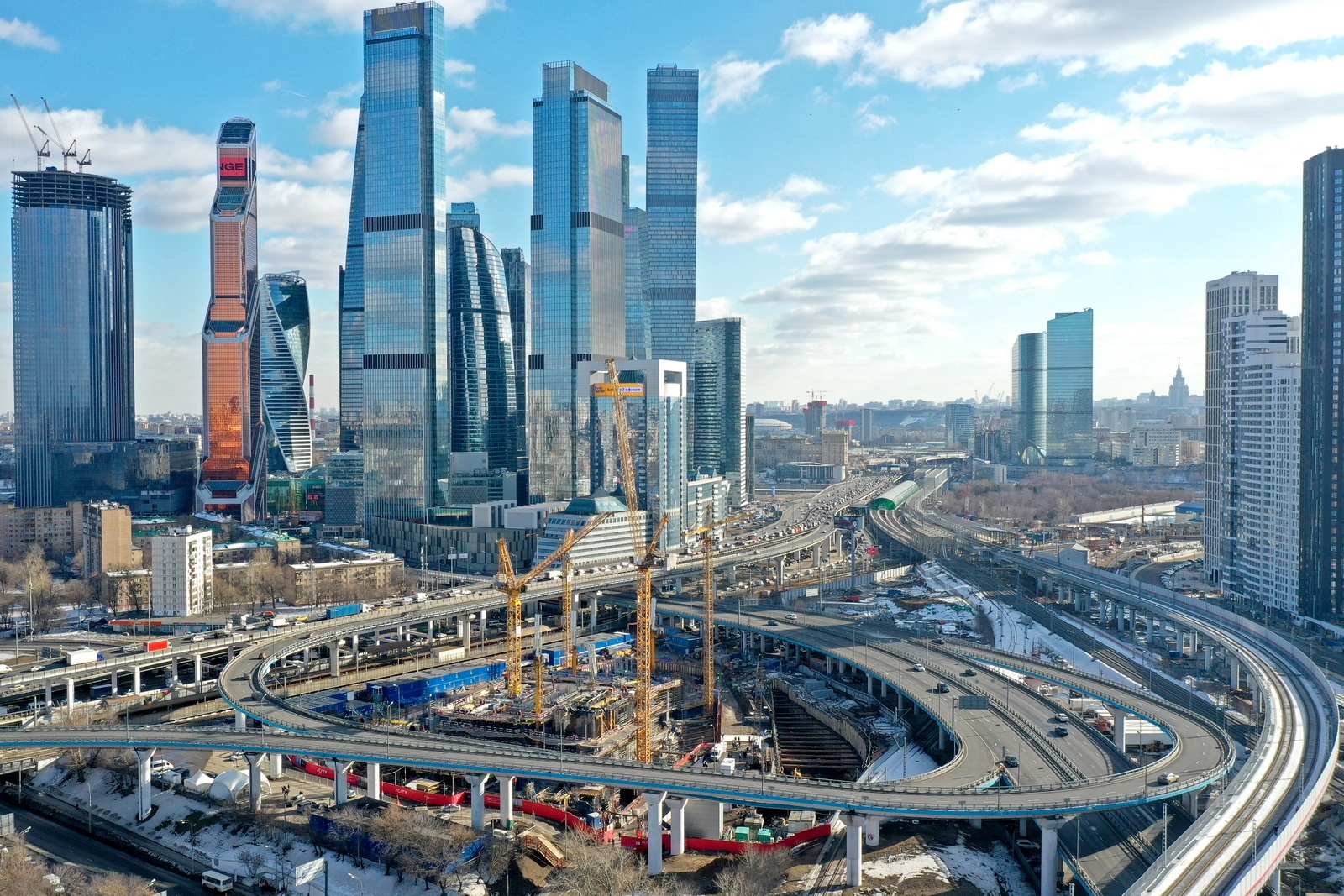
March 2022

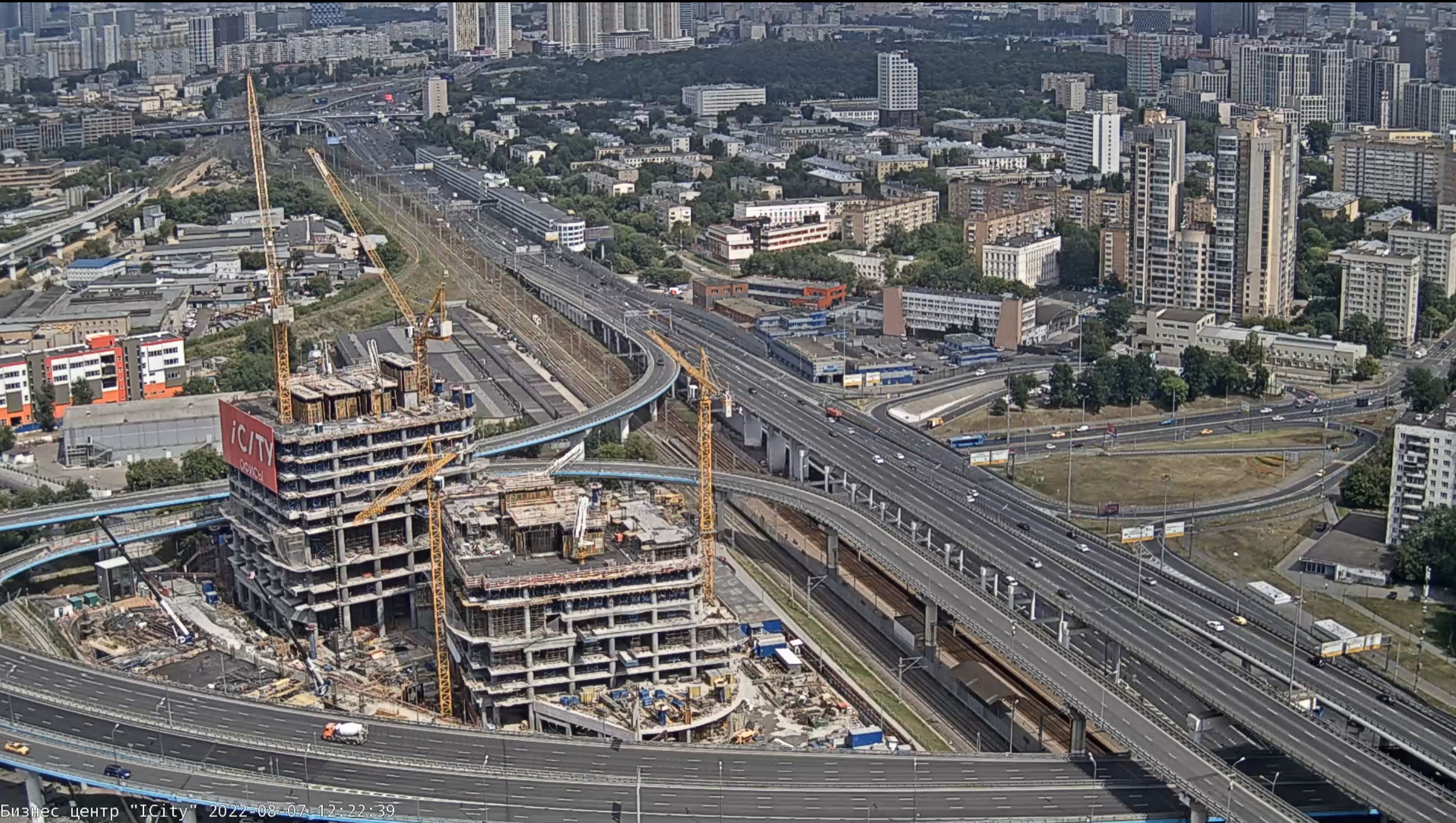
August 2022
