= Krasnopresnenskaya Embankment =

Street in Moscow, Russia

Coordinates: 55°45′12″N 37°33′26″E

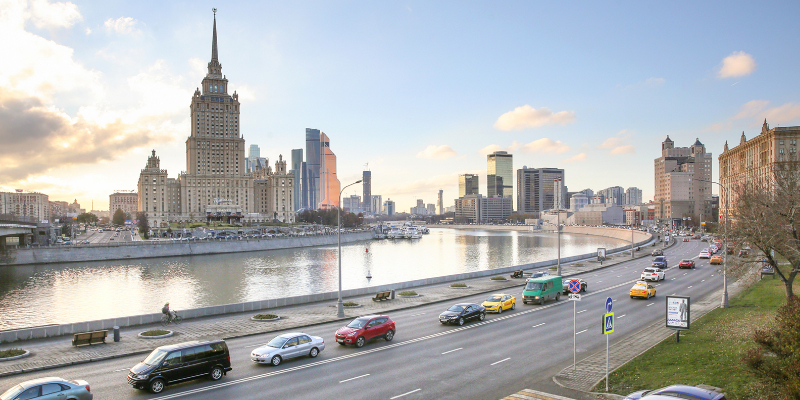
- Native name: Краснопресненская набережная (Russian)
- Length: 3 km (1.9 mi)
- Location: Moscow, Russia; Central Administrative Okrug; Presnensky District

Krasnopresnenskaya Embankment is an embankment located in Presnensky District of Moscow. It passes through the Bagration and Novoarbatsky Bridge.

== Notable buildings ==
Krasnopresnenskaya Embankment is the location of the White House, which hosts the government of Russia. It previously housed the People's Control Commission and the Supreme Soviet of Russia. The World Trade Center Moscow, which was built between 1977 and 1981, is also located here.
