= Moscow Octod Tower =

Steel lattice television tower in Moscow, Russia

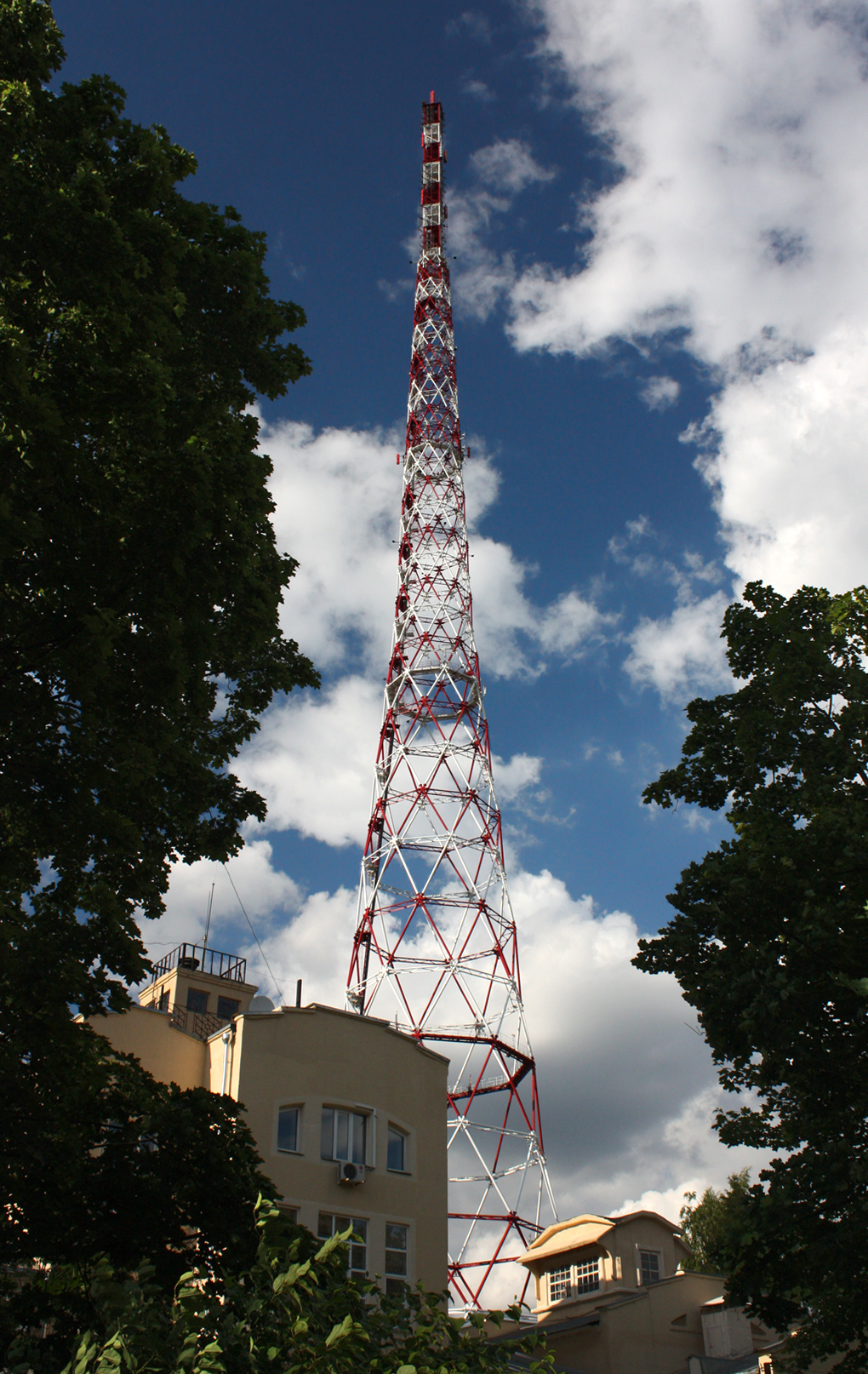

- Location within Russia

General information
- Status: Completed
- Type: Steel lattice television tower
- Location: Moscow
- Coordinates: 55°46′53″N 37°29′23″E
- Completed: 2006

Height
- Height: 258 m (846 ft)

Moscow Octod Tower was a 258 metres (846 ft) tall lattice tower in Moscow, Russia. The Moscow Octod Tower is a lattice tower used for FM- and TV-transmission in an unusual octagonal cross section, it is one of the tallest Hyperboloid structures in the world. Construction work on Moscow Octod Tower started in 2004. It was completed in 2006. The owner of the tower is the broadcasting company "Octod". The company and tower are situated on the territory of the former "October radio center." The address is "Demyana Bednogo str. 24, Khoroshevo-Mnyovniki district," in the western part of Moscow.

Components were made completely of steel at a machine-building plant in Syzran. The lower sections of the Moscow Octod Tower were assembled using a crane; the top was lowered by helicopter Mil Mi-26TM.

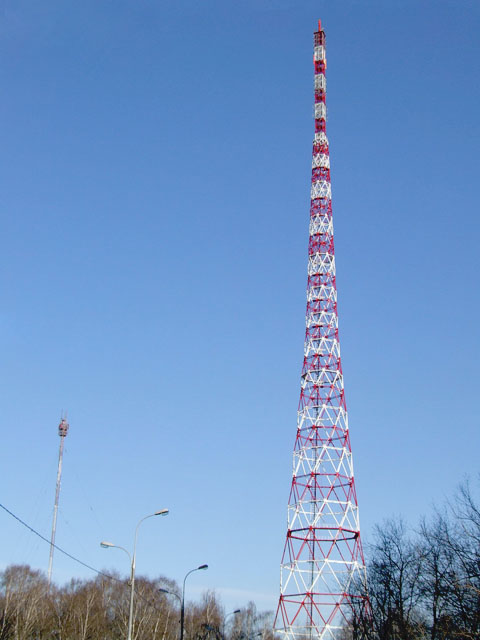
Moscow Tower

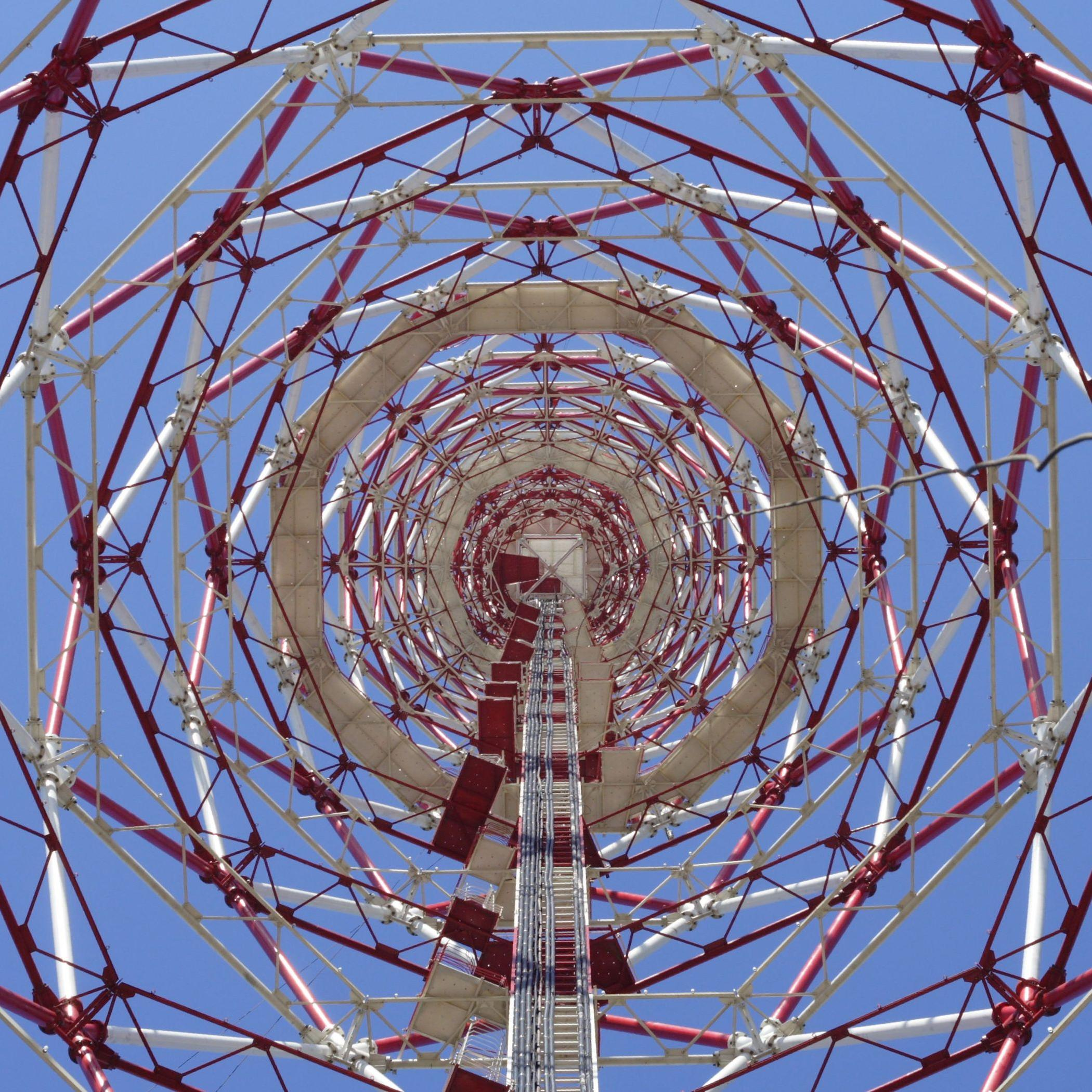
View from inside

== Dismantling ==
In 2020, according to the order of the Moskomarchitecture on the main activity No. 843 of 11.06.2020, the land of the former October radio center was given for development.

In August 2022, the dismantling of the tower structures began. Since September 2022, the specialists of the Dismantge Expert LLC on the tower are under analysis of metal structures, corrosion was noticed during the dismantling of several sections, water was discovered inside the crossbars of one of the sections. The work was suspended several times due to violation of the contract clauses by the customer. As of 2024, the work is not completed.

== See also ==
- Lattice tower
- List of famous transmission sites
