= Sparrow Hill =

Coordinates: 41.9501°N 70.6940°W

Sparrow Hill is a summit in Plymouth, Plymouth County, Massachusetts. The elevation is 167 feet (51 m).

Sparrow Hill has the name of Richard Sparrow, a pioneer who was granted the land in 1637.
