= Sparrow Hills (building) =

Residential complex in Moscow, Russia

Coordinates: 55°42′53″N 37°30′21″E

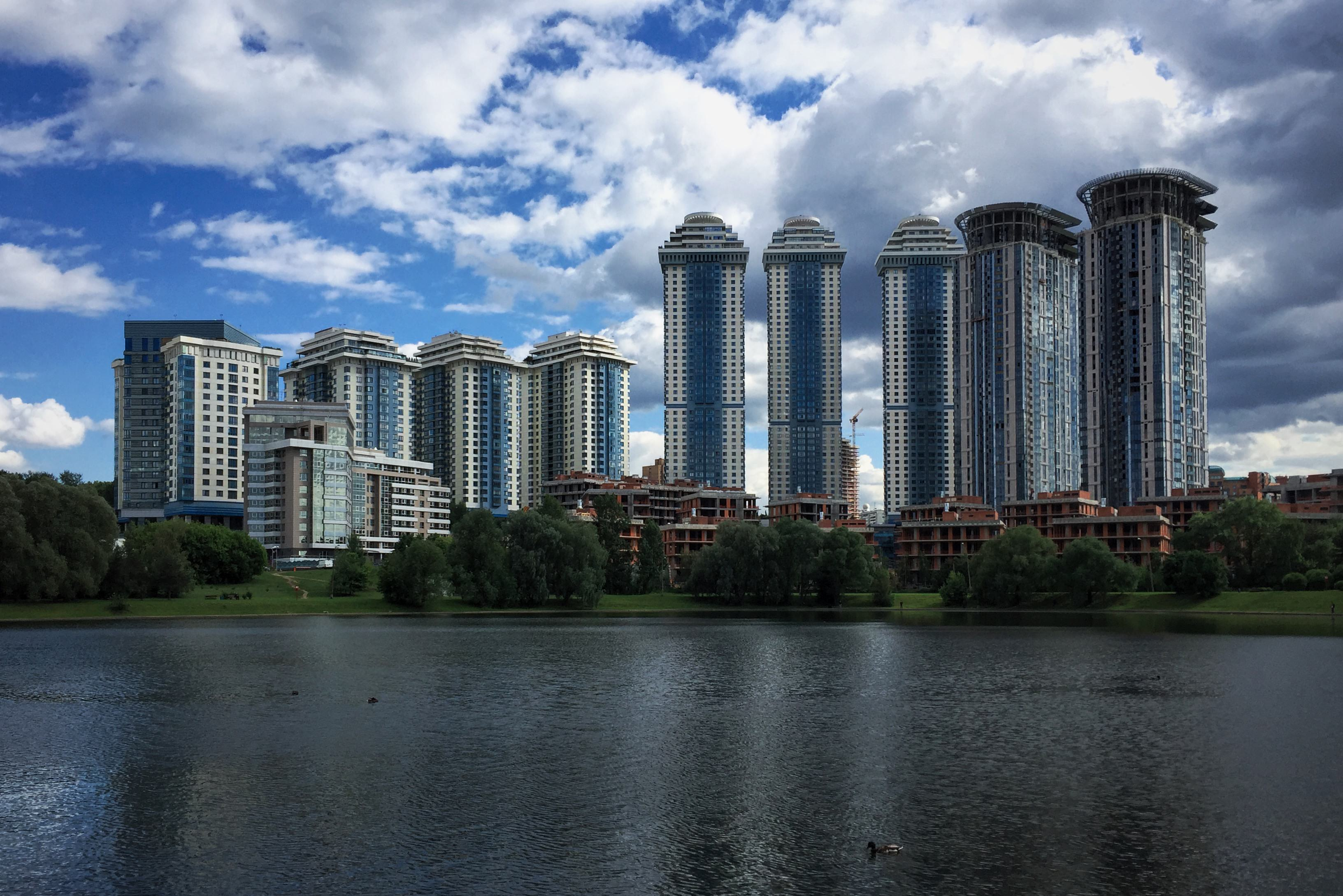
Residential complex Vorobyovy Gory

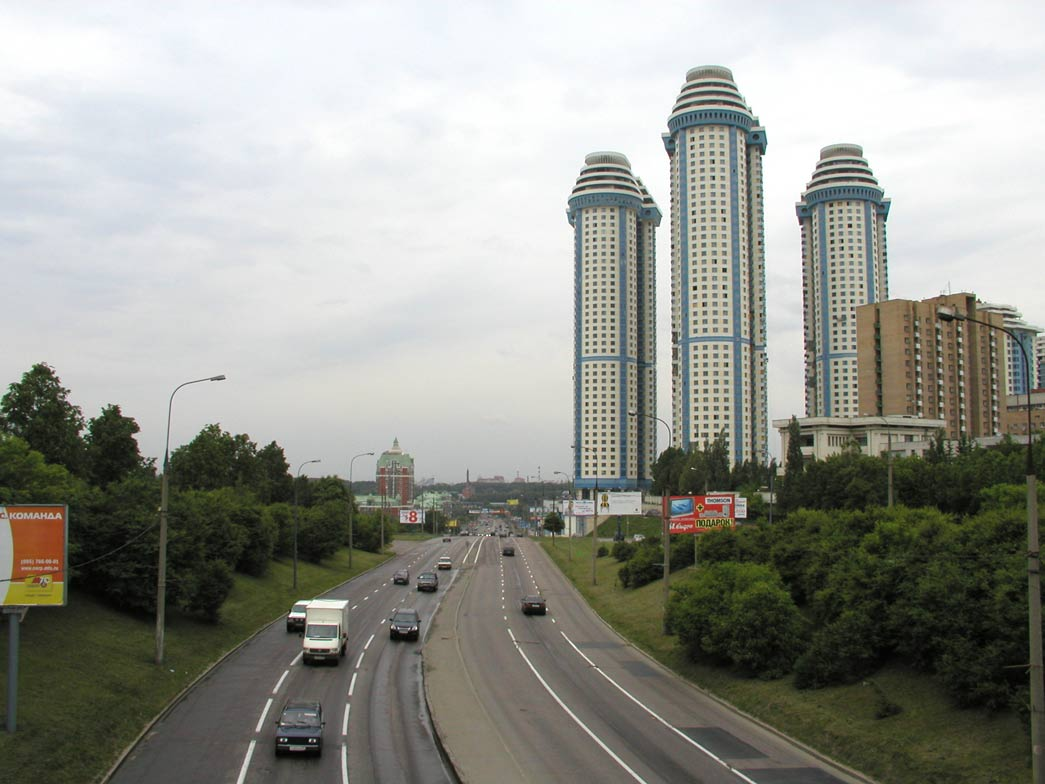
Residential complex Vorobyovy Gory

Sparrow Hills or Vorobyovy Gory (Russian: Воробьёвы Го́ры) is a residential complex in Moscow. The complex located at the base of Sparrow Hills and comprises seven buildings. 1,039 apartments are located in that complex, that was completed in 2004. As of 2007, its building 2 is the 4th tallest building in Moscow and the 3rd tallest residential building in Europe, with the tallest being a fellow Muscovite, the Triumph-Palace. The complex' address is Mosfil'movskaya ulitsa, 70. Tower Four is

Name	Height		Floors
Name	m	ft	Floors
Building 1	155	509	44
Building 2	188.2	617	49
Building 3	155	509	44
Building 4	55	180	28
Building 5	?		25
Building 6	?		23
Building 7	?		20

== See also ==
- List of skyscrapers in Europe
- List of tallest buildings in Moscow
