= Nordstar Tower =

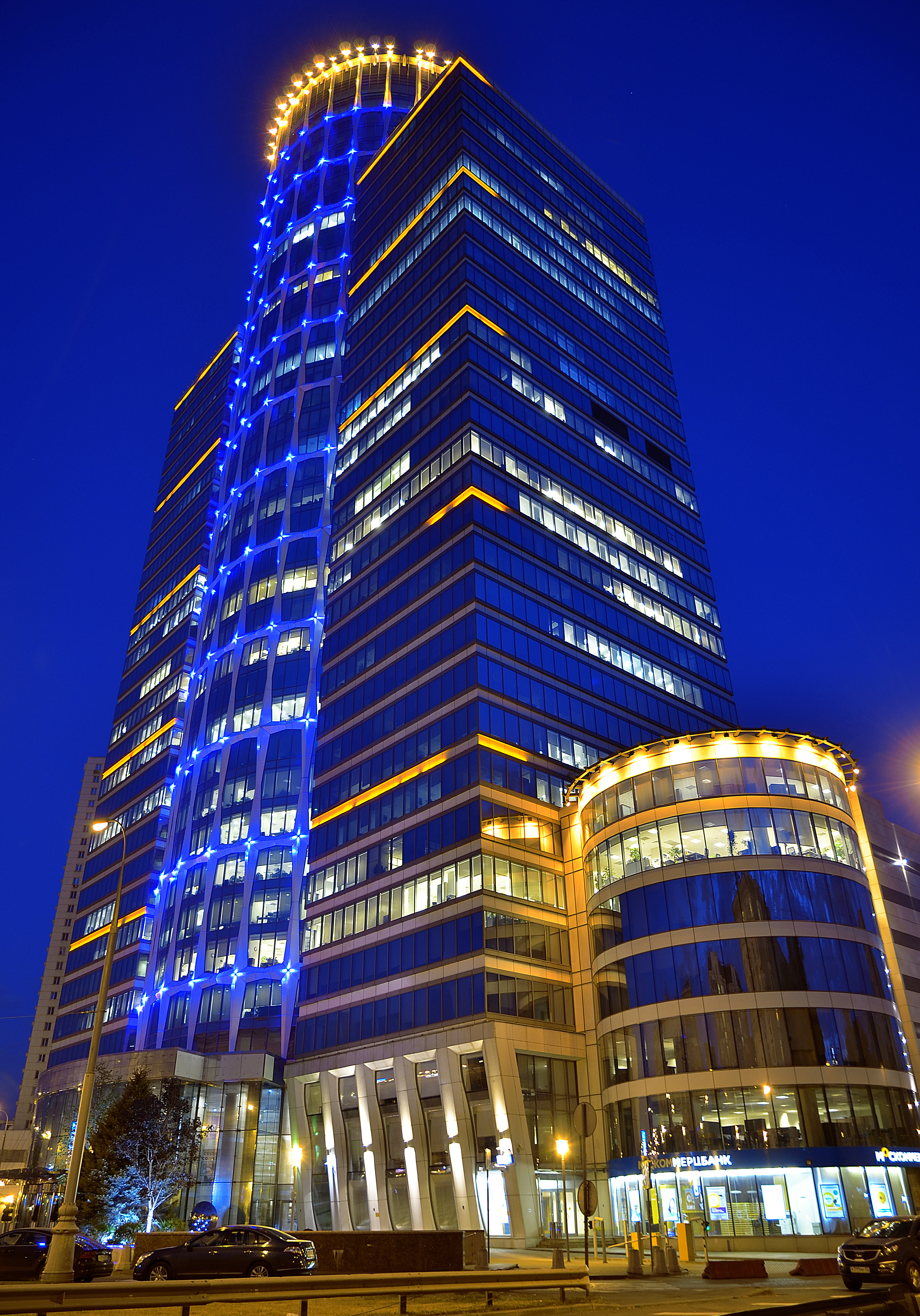

- Location within Moscow

General information
- Status: Completed
- Type: Office
- Location: Moscow, Russia, Khoroshovskoye Highway
- Coordinates: 55°46′34″N 37°33′13″E
- Construction started: 2006
- Completed: 2009

Height
- Height: 171.5

Technical details
- Floor count: 42
- Floor area: 147,000 m^{2} (1,580,000 sq ft)
- Lifts/elevators: 30

Website
- http://www.nord-star-tower.ru

Nordstar Tower is a skyscraper office building in Moscow, Russia. Construction was begun in 2006 and completed in 2009. There are 42 floors (40 above ground), 30 elevators, and the gross floorspace is 147,000 square metres. Roof height is 171.5 metres.

On May 28, 2026 a video was published showing the Russian Armed Forces installing a Pantsir missile system on top of the building.

== Structure ==
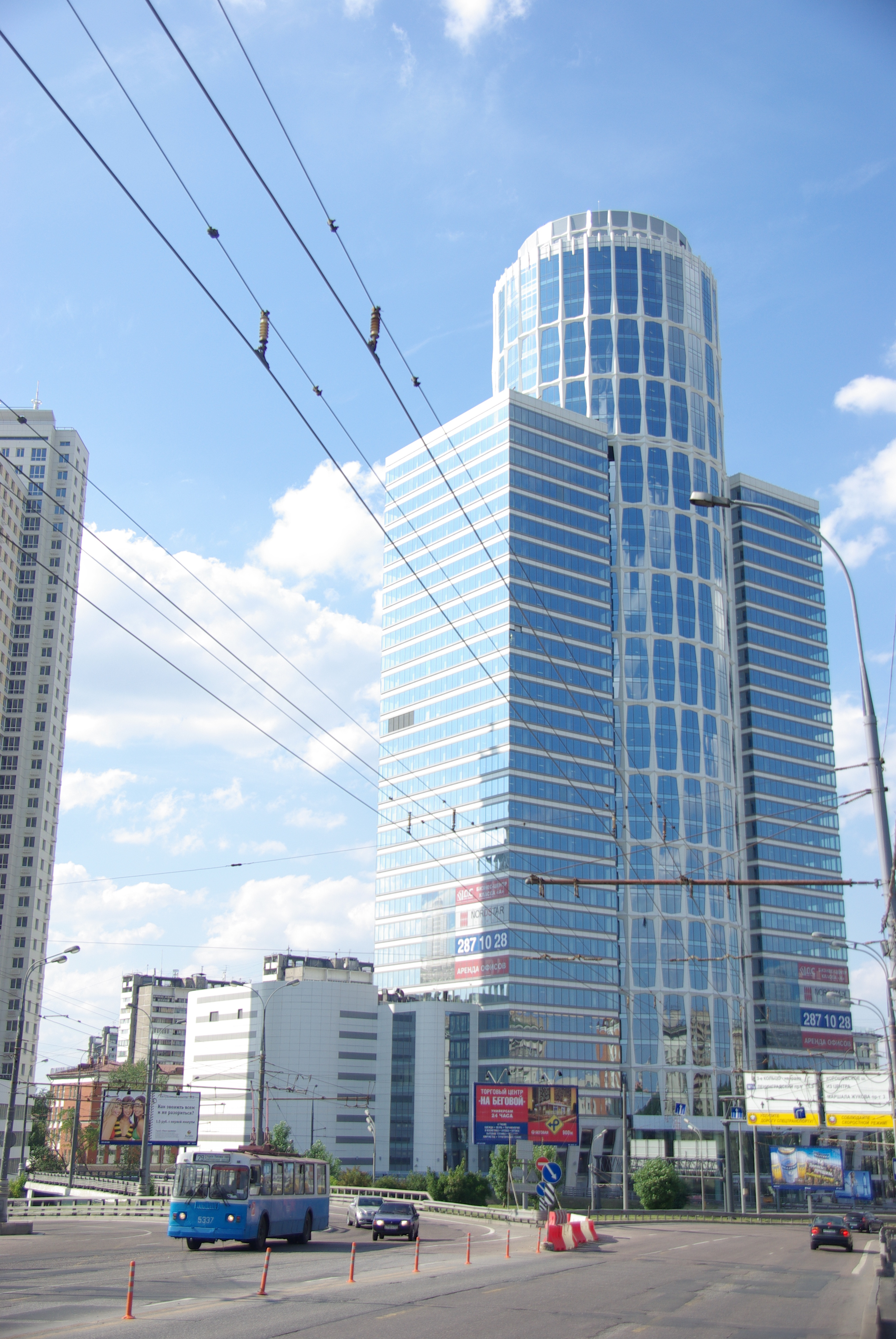
Daytime view

- Structural material, concrete
- Facade material, aluminum
- Facade system, curtain wall
