= Pokrovskoye-Streshnevo District =

- District
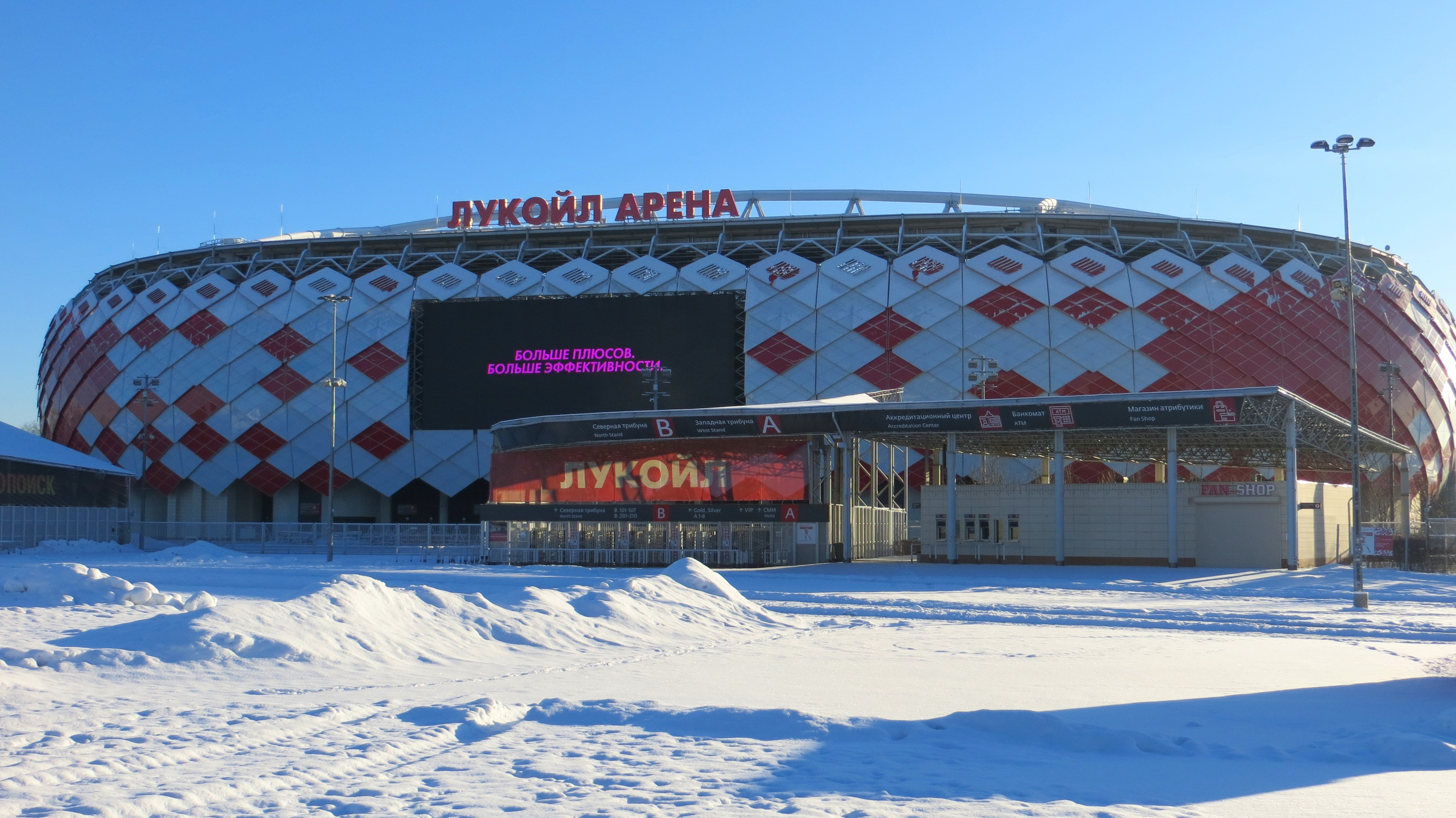
- Spartak stadium (Lukoil Arena), Pokrovskoye-Streshnevo District

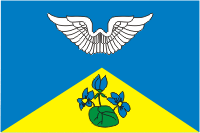
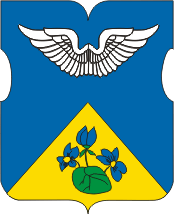
- Flag Coat of arms
- Location of Pokrovskoye-Streshnevo District on the map of Moscow
- Coordinates: 55°49′16″N 37°28′27″E
- Country: Russia
- Federal subject: Moscow

Area
  - Total: 12.9 km^{2} (5.0 sq mi)
- Time zone: UTC+
- OKTMO ID: 45368000
- Website: http://pokrov-streshnevo.mos.ru/

Pokrovskoye-Streshnevo District (Russian: район Покро́вское-Стре́шнево) is an administrative district (raion) of North-Western Administrative Okrug, and one of the 125 raions of Moscow, Russia.

== See also ==
- Administrative divisions of Moscow
