= Grand Tower (Moscow) =

Skyscraper under construction in Moscow, Russia

Moscow Towers
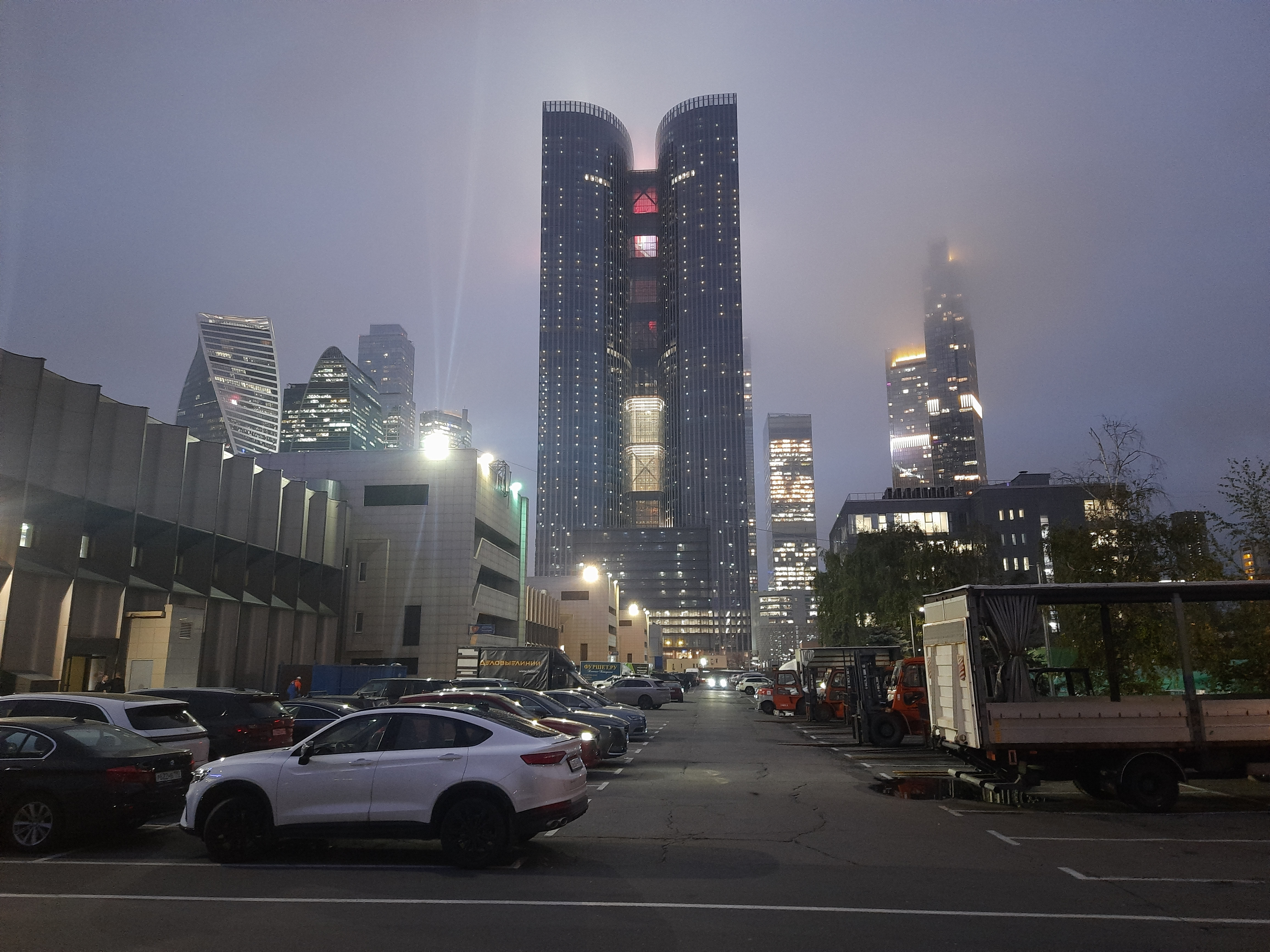
- Interactive map of the Moscow Towers area

General information
- Location: Moscow, Russia
- Coordinates: 55°48′N 37°30′E
- Construction started: 2013
- Completed: 2024
- Owner: Russian Railways

Height
- Height: 283.4 metres (930 ft)

Technical details
- Floor count: 62
- Floor area: 400,000 m^{2}

Design and construction
- Architect: Werner Sobek

Website
- grandtower.moscow

The Moscow Towers is a skyscraper located on plot 15 in the Moscow International Business Center in Moscow, Russia. The tower is 283.4 meters tall with a total of 62 floors and 400,000 m^{2} of floor area.

== Gallery ==
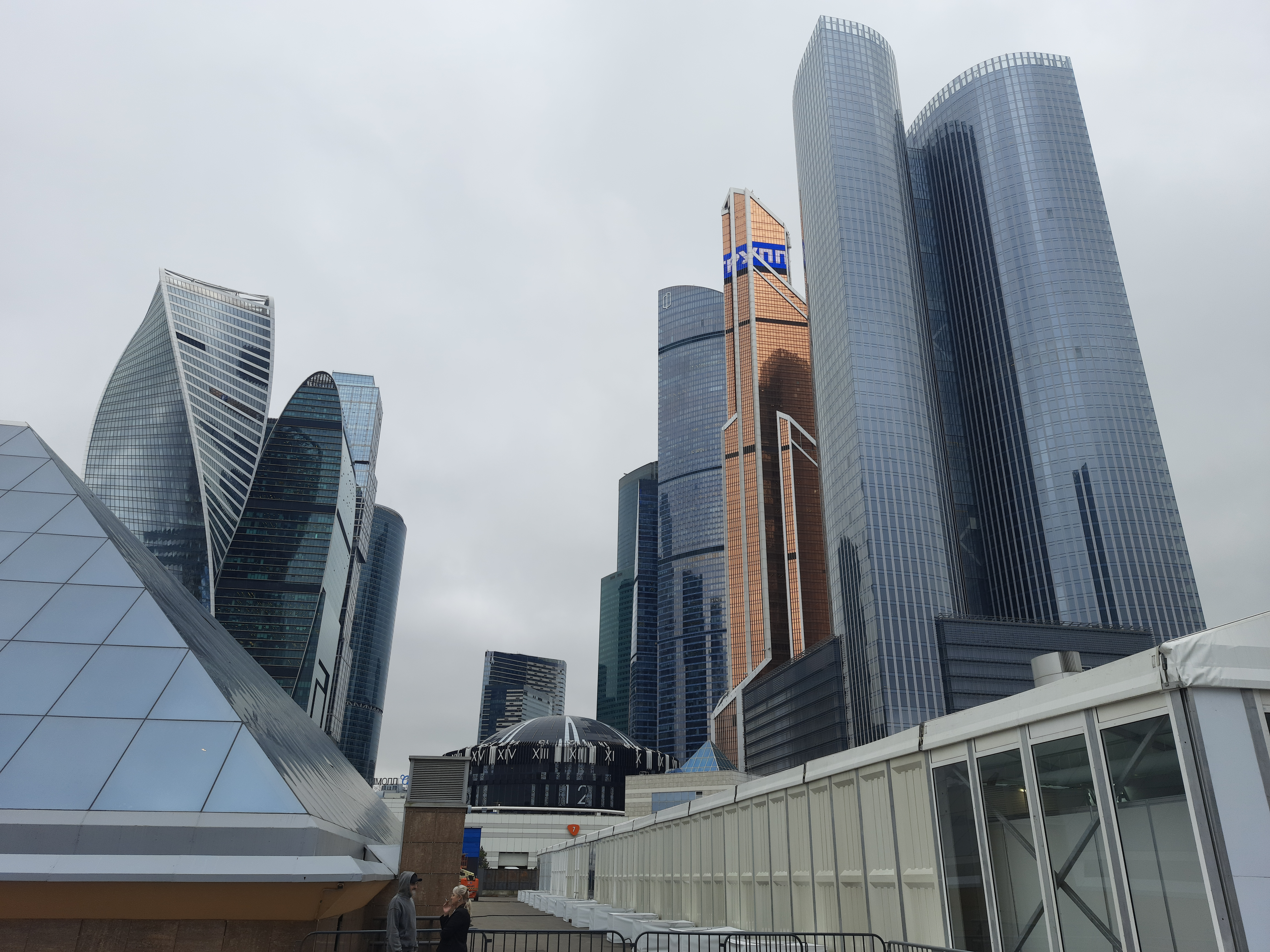

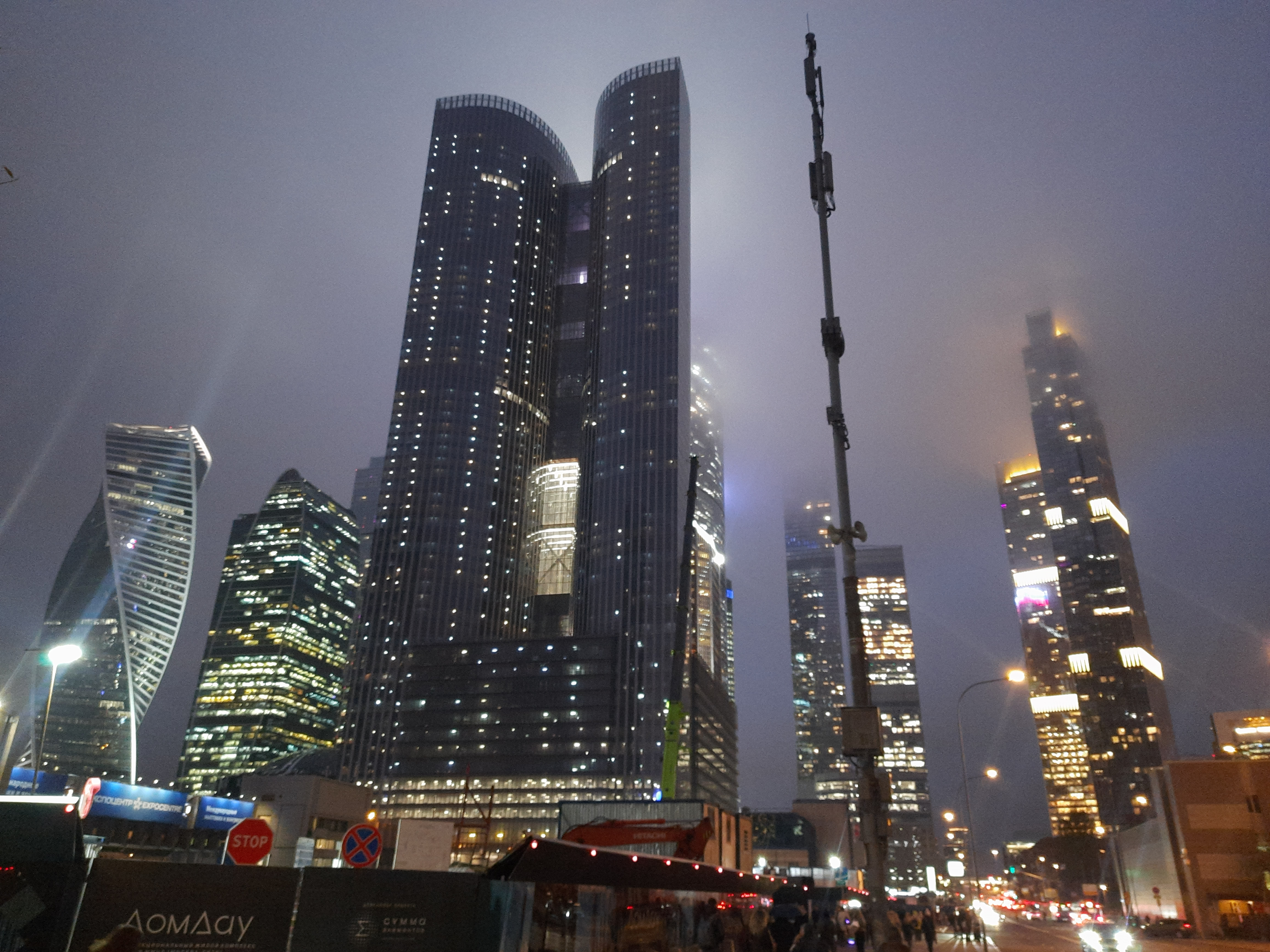

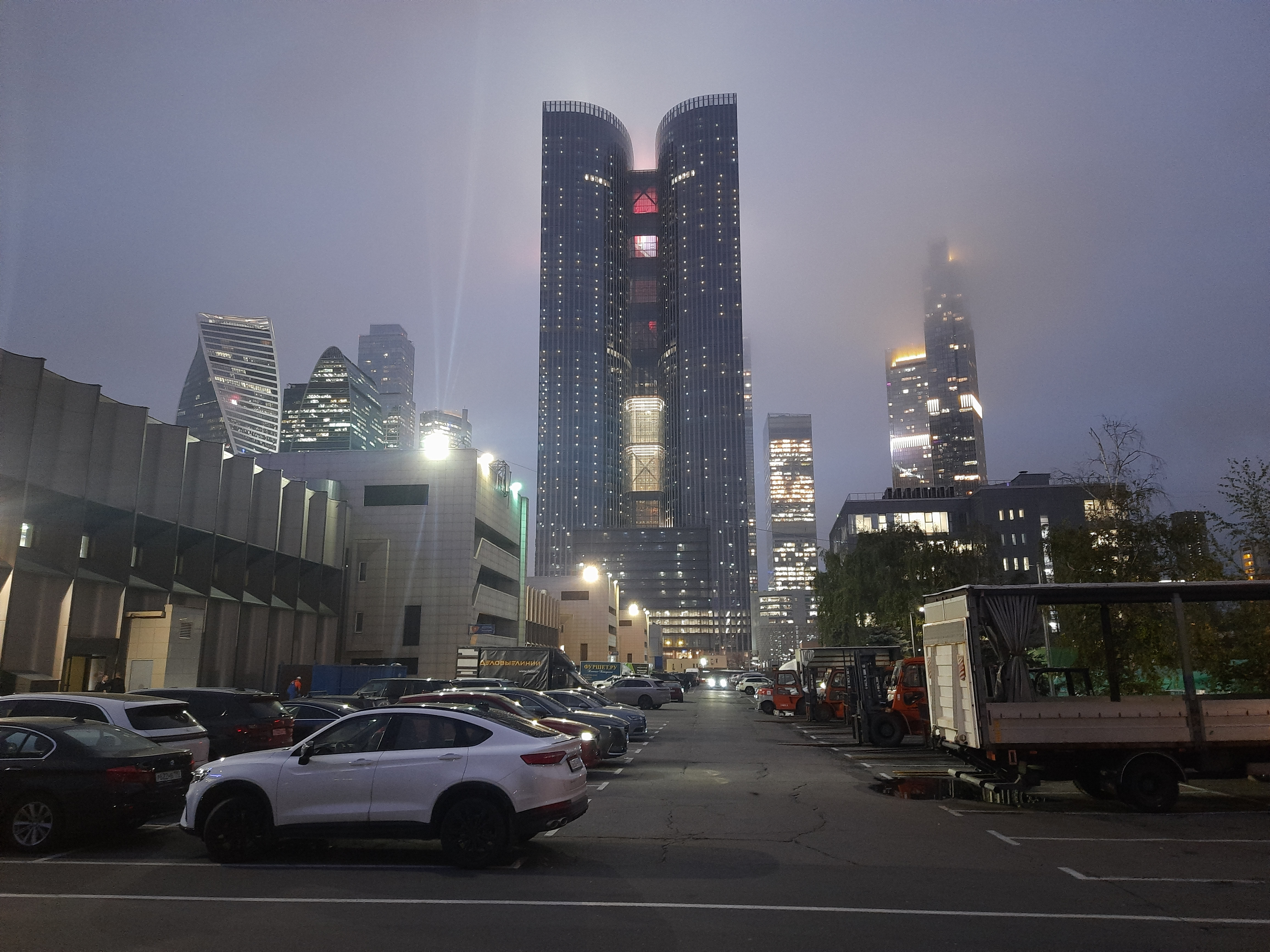
