= Edelweiss (skyscraper) =

Residential in Moscow, Russia

- Эдельвейс
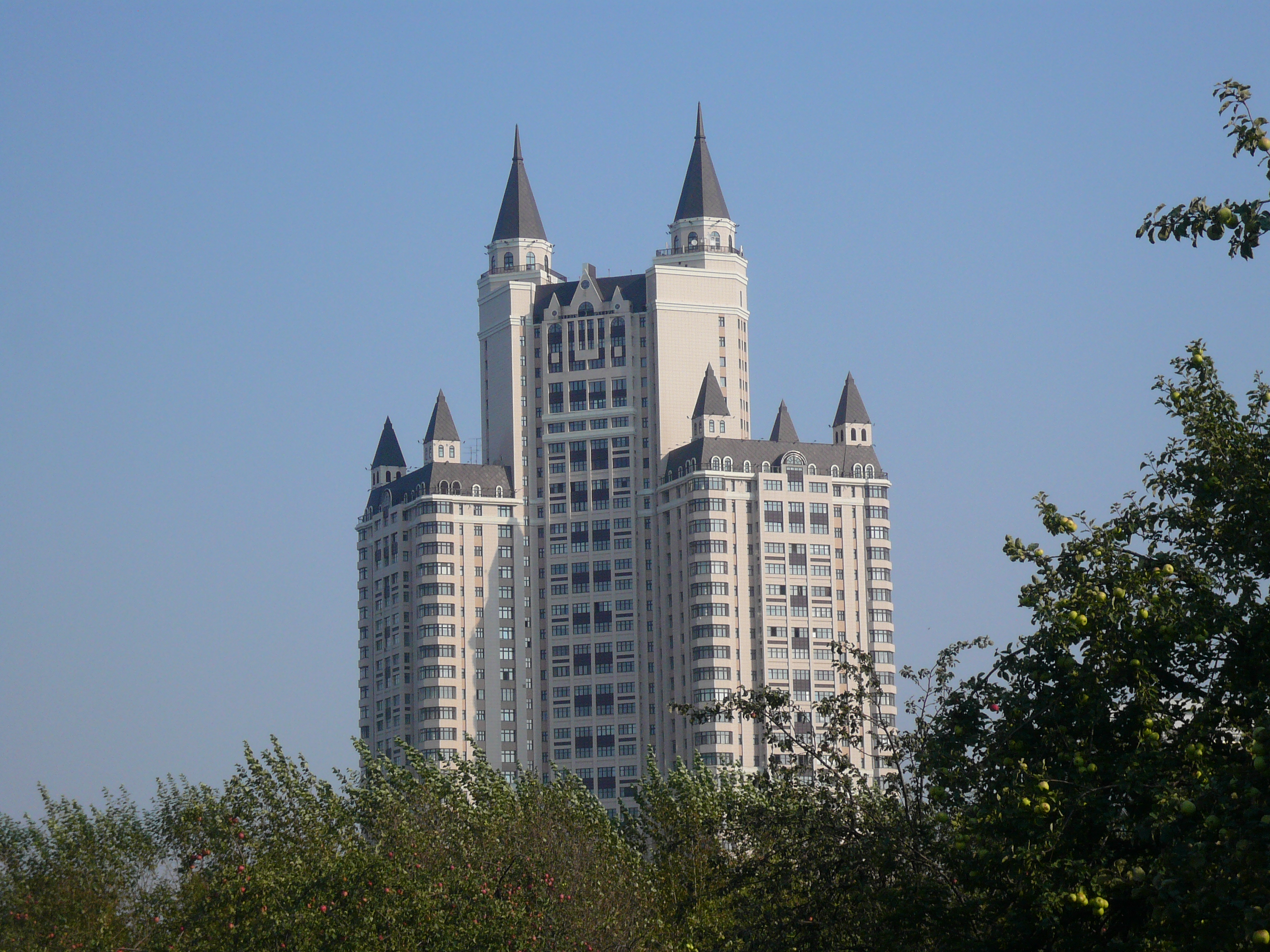

- Location within Moscow
- Alternative names: Edelveis; The 8th Tower of Moscow

General information
- Status: Completed
- Type: Residential
- Location: Moscow, Russia, Russia
- Coordinates: 55°43′38.64″N 37°28′47.64″E
- Construction started: 2000
- Completed: 2003

Height
- Antenna spire: 176 m (577 ft)
- Roof: 157 m (515 ft)

Technical details
- Floor count: 43
- Floor area: 105,000 m^{2} (1,130,000 sq ft)

Edelweiss (Russian: Эдельвейс) is a 43-story residential high-rise in Moscow, completed in 2003.

== Overview ==
The tower stands 157 m (515 ft) tall with a spire extending an additional 19 m (62 ft). The building was designed to be a companion for the Seven Sisters and shares a similar design concept with Triumph-Palace. Edelweiss is the first project in "The New Circle of Moscow" program, in which about sixty high rise multi-use residential complexes will be built on plots around the city which were approved by the Moscow Architecture Committee.

== Facilities ==
Recreational facilities include an aquapark equipped with hydromassage tubs, waterslides, a solarium, a universal gymnasium, a ten-track bowling center, and billiards rooms.
