= Sberbank City =

Building complex in Moscow, Russia

Coordinates: 55°44′30″N 37°31′52″E

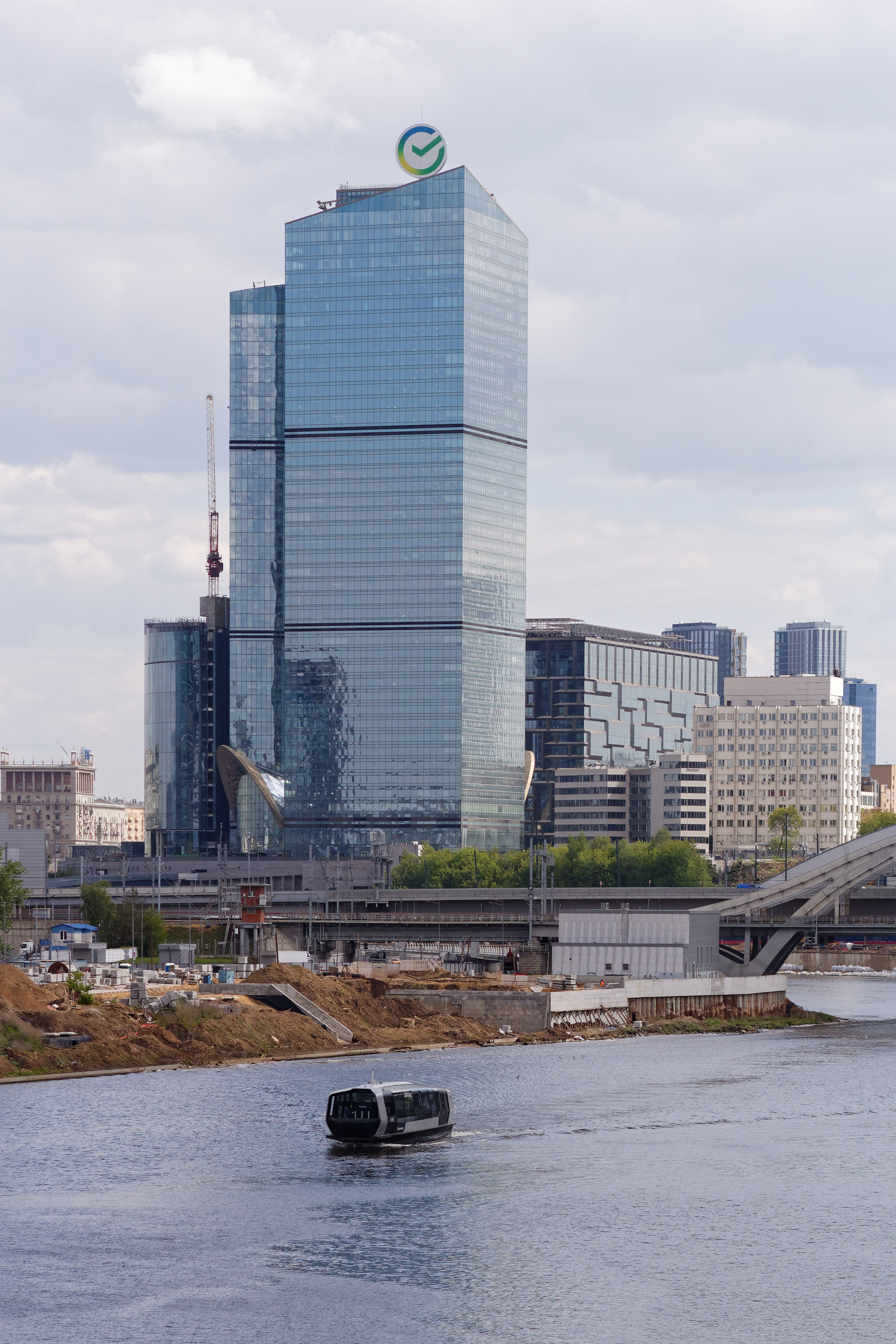
- Interactive map of the Sberbank City area

General information
- Type: Mixed: Office; Parking garage; Residential; Retail
- Location: Kutuzovsky Prospekt, Moscow, Russia
- Construction started: 2006
- Completed: 2021
- Owner: Sberbank

Height
- Roof: 632 ft (193 m) (Tower A); 550 ft (168 m) (Tower B)

Technical details
- Floor count: 47 (Tower A); 41 (Tower B)
- Floor area: 207,700 m^{2} (2,235,664 sq ft)

Design and construction
- Architects: Sergey Kisselev & Partners
- Architecture firm: Eller + Eller GmbH Architekten
- Engineer: Igor Shvarcman, Konstantin Spiridonov

Sberbank City (former Mirax Plaza; Russian: Сбербанк-Сити) is a building complex in Moscow, Russia, that opened in November 2021. It consists of five buildings, including two skyscrapers, with a gross floor area of 207,700 m^{2} (2,235,664 sq ft).

It is located in Moscow Kutuzovsky prospect (crossing with Kulnev street). When planned, the complex was to have a monorail connection crossing the Moskva River to the Federation complex and parking spaces for 2,950 cars. The construction project was led by the Russian project developers Mirax Group, also responsible for the nearby 506 metre-high Federation Tower. Designed by Sergey Kisselev & Partners, the multifunctional complex comprises two towers with 41 and 47 floors, and lower buildings. The complex was to house offices and retail space for national and international companies, as well as restaurants and cafés.
