= List of tallest buildings in Europe by year =

This list of tallest buildings in Europe by year ranks the tallest buildings in Europe by year according to height. Only the ten tallest buildings are included for all decades other than those buildings currently tallest in Europe.

== Current tallest ==
This is a list of the tallest completed buildings in Europe. Heights are measured to the structural height, which includes architectural elements, but not communications spires or antennas. All measurements are according to the Council on Tall Buildings and Urban Habitat. Only the tallest 20 completed buildings in Europe are included.

| Rank | Building | City | Country | Height (m) | Height (ft) | Floors | Completed |
|---|---|---|---|---|---|---|---|
| 1 | Lakhta Center | Saint Petersburg | Russia | 462.5 m | 1516 ft | 87 | 2018 |
| 2 | Federation Tower: East Tower | Moscow | Russia | 373.7 | 1,226 ft | 95 | 2016 |
| 3 | OKO Towers: South Tower | Moscow | Russia | 354 m | 1,160 ft | 85 | 2015 |
| 4 | CBRT Tower | Istanbul | Turkey | 352 m | 1,155 ft | 59 | 2024 |
| 5 | Neva Tower 2 | Moscow | Russia | 345 m | 1,132 ft | 79 | 2019 |
| 6 | Mercury City Tower | Moscow | Russia | 339 m | 1112 ft | 75 | 2013 |
| 7 | Varso Tower | Warsaw | Poland | 310 m | 1,020 ft | 54 | 2021 |
| 8 | The Shard | London | United Kingdom | 309 m | 1017 ft | 85 | 2012 |
| 9 | Eurasia Tower | Moscow | Russia | 309 m | 1013 ft | 72 | 2014 |
| 10 | Neva Tower 1 | Moscow | Russia | 302 m | 991 ft | 69 | 2019 |
| 11 | CoC: Moscow Tower | Moscow | Russia | 302 m | 990 ft | 76 | 2010 |
| 12 | Capital Towers 1 | Moscow | Russia | 295 m | 968 ft | 65 | 2023 |
| 13 | Capital Towers 2 | Moscow | Russia | 295 m | 968 ft | 65 | 2023 |
| 14 | Capital Towers 3 | Moscow | Russia | 295 m | 968 ft | 65 | 2023 |
| 15 | Skyland İstanbul 1 | Istanbul | Turkey | 293.1 m | 932 ft | 65 | 2017 |
| 16 | Skyland İstanbul 2 | Istanbul | Turkey | 293.1 m | 932 ft | 65 | 2017 |
| 17 | Moscow Towers | Moscow | Russia | 283.4 m | 930 ft | 62 | 2024 |
| 18 | Metropol İstanbul | Istanbul | Turkey | 280 m | 919 ft | 66 | 2017 |
| 19 | 22 Bishopsgate | London | United Kingdom | 278 m | 912 ft | 62 | 2019 |
| 20 | Baku Tower | Baku | Azerbaijan | 276 m | 906 ft | 51 | 2020 |
| 21 | Naberezhnaya Tower Block C | Moscow | Russia | 268 m | 881 ft | 61 | 2007 |
| 22 | Triumph Palace | Moscow | Russia | 264 m | 866 ft | 61 | 2005 |
| 23 | Commerzbank Tower | Frankfurt | Germany | 259 m | 850 ft | 56 | 1997 |
| 24 | CoC: St. Petersburg Tower | Moscow | Russia | 257 m | 844 ft | 65 | 2010 |
| 25 | Messeturm | Frankfurt | Germany | 257 m | 842 ft | 64 | 1990 |
| 26 | Nurol Life | Istanbul | Turkey | 252 m | 820 ft | 58 | 2016 |

== Historical tallest ==
This is a list of the tallest completed buildings in Europe at the end of recent decades. Heights are measured to the structural height, which includes architectural elements, but not communications spires or antennas. All measurements are according to the Council on Tall Buildings and Urban Habitat. Only the tallest 10 completed buildings in Europe are included in each section.

=== 2000s ===
| Rank | Building | City | Height (m) | Height (ft) | Built |
|---|---|---|---|---|---|
| 1 | Naberezhnaya Tower Block C | (Russia) Moscow | 268 m | 881 ft | 2007 |
| 2 | Triumph Palace | (Russia) Moscow | 264 m | 866 ft | 2005 |
| 3 | Commerzbank Tower | (Germany) Frankfurt | 259 m | 850 ft | 1997 |
| 4 | MesseTurm | (Germany) Frankfurt | 257 m | 842 ft | 1990 |
| 5 | Torre de Cristal | Spain | 249 m | 817 ft | 2008 |
| 6 | Torre Caja Madrid | Spain | 248 m | 815 ft | 2008 |
| 7 | Federation Towers - Zapad Tower | (Russia) Moscow | 242 m | 795 ft | 2008 |
| 8 | MV Lomonosov State University | (Russia) Moscow | 239 m | 784 ft | 1953 |
| 9 | Torre Sacyr Vallehermoso | (Spain) Madrid | 236 m | 774 ft | 2008 |
| 10 | One Canada Square | (United Kingdom) London | 236 m | 774 ft | 1991 |

=== 1990s ===
| Rank | Building | City | Height (m) | Height (ft) | Built |
|---|---|---|---|---|---|
| 1 | Commerzbank Tower | (Germany) Frankfurt | 259 m | 850 ft | 1997 |
| 2 | Messeturm | (Germany) Frankfurt | 257 m | 842 ft | 1990 |
| 3 | Moscow State University | (Russia) Moscow | 239 m | 784 ft | 1953 |
| 4 | One Canada Square | (United Kingdom) London | 236 m | 774 ft | 1991 |
| 5 | Palace of Culture and Science | (Poland) Warsaw | 231 m | 757 ft | 1955 |
| 6 | Tour Montparnasse | (France) Paris | 209 m | 686 ft | 1973 |
| 7 | Westendstraße 1 | (Germany) Frankfurt | 208 m | 682 ft | 1993 |
| 8 | Warsaw Trade Tower | (Poland) Warsaw | 208 m | 682 ft | 1999 |
| 9 | Ukraina Hotel | (Russia) Moscow | 206 m | 676 ft | 1955 |
| 10 | Millennium Tower | (Austria) Vienna | 202 m | 663 ft | 1999 |

=== 1980s ===
| Rank | Building | City | Height (m) | Height (ft) | Built |
|---|---|---|---|---|---|
| 1 | Moscow State University | (Soviet Union) Moscow | 239 m | 784 ft | 1953 |
| 2 | Palace of Culture and Science | (Poland) Warsaw | 231 m | 757 ft | 1955 |
| 3 | Tour Montparnasse | (France) Paris | 209 m | 686 ft | 1973 |
| 4 | Ukraina Hotel | (Soviet Union) Moscow | 206 m | 676 ft | 1955 |
| 5 | Tower 42 | (United Kingdom) London | 183 m | 600 ft | 1980 |
| 6 | Tour Total Coupole | (France) Paris | 179 m | 587 ft | 1985 |
| 7 | Tour Areva | (France) Paris | 178 m | 584 ft | 1974 |
| 8 | Mersin Complex | (Turkey) Mersin | 177 m | 580 ft | 1987 |
| 9 | Kotelnicheskaya Naberezhnaya | (Soviet Union) Moscow | 176 m | 577 ft | 1952 |
| 10 | Ministry of Foreign Affairs | (Soviet Union) Moscow | 172 m | 564 ft | 1953 |

=== 1970s ===
| Rank | Building | City | Height (m) | Height (ft) | Built |
|---|---|---|---|---|---|
| 1 | Moscow State University | (Soviet Union) Moscow | 239 m | 784 ft | 1953 |
| 2 | Palace of Culture and Science | (Poland) Warsaw | 231 m | 757 ft | 1955 |
| 3 | Tour Montparnasse | (France) Paris | 209 m | 686 ft | 1973 |
| 4 | Ukraina Hotel | (Soviet Union) Moscow | 206 m | 676 ft | 1955 |
| 5 | Tour Areva | (France) Paris | 178 m | 584 ft | 1974 |
| 6 | Kotelnicheskaya Naberezhnaya | (Soviet Union) Moscow | 176 m | 577 ft | 1952 |
| 7 | Ministry of Foreign Affairs | (Soviet Union) Moscow | 172 m | 564 ft | 1953 |
| 8 | Silver Tower | (Germany) Frankfurt | 166 m | 546 ft | 1978 |
| 9 | Tour Gan | (France) Paris | 166 m | 545 ft | 1974 |
| 10 | Tour de Credit Lyonnais | (France) Lyon | 165 m | 541 ft | 1977 |

=== 1960s ===
| Rank | Building | City | Height (m) | Height (ft) | Built |
|---|---|---|---|---|---|
| 1 | Moscow State University | (Soviet Union) Moscow | 239 m | 784 ft | 1953 |
| 2 | Palace of Culture and Science | (Poland) Warsaw | 231 m | 757 ft | 1955 |
| 3 | Ukraina Hotel | (Soviet Union) Moscow | 206 m | 676 ft | 1955 |
| 4 | Kotelnicheskaya Naberezhnaya | (Soviet Union) Moscow | 176 m | 577 ft | 1952 |
| 5 | Ministry of Foreign Affairs | (Soviet Union) Moscow | 172 m | 564 ft | 1953 |
| 6 | Kudrinskaya Square | (Soviet Union) Moscow | 156 m | 512 ft | 1954 |
| 7 | Tour du Midi | (Belgium) Brussels | 148 m | 486 ft | 1966 |
| 8 | Torre de Madrid | (Spain) Madrid | 142 m | 466 ft | 1957 |
| 9 | Red Gate Square | (Soviet Union) Moscow | 138 m | 453 ft | 1953 |
| 10 | Hilton Moscow Leningradskaya | (Soviet Union) Moscow | 136 m | 446 ft | 1954 |

=== 1950s ===
| Rank | Building | City | Height (m) | Height (ft) | Built |
|---|---|---|---|---|---|
| 1 | Moscow State University | (Soviet Union) Moscow | 239 m | 784 ft | 1953 |
| 2 | Palace of Culture and Science | (Poland) Warsaw | 231 m | 757 ft | 1955 |
| 3 | Ukraina Hotel | (Soviet Union) Moscow | 206 m | 676 ft | 1955 |
| 4 | Kotelnicheskaya Naberezhnaya | (Soviet Union) Moscow | 176 m | 577 ft | 1952 |
| 5 | Ministry of Foreign Affairs | (Soviet Union) Moscow | 172 m | 564 ft | 1953 |
| 6 | Kudrinskaya Square | (Soviet Union) Moscow | 156 m | 512 ft | 1954 |
| 7 | Torre de Madrid | (Spain) Madrid | 142 m | 466 ft | 1957 |
| 8 | Red Gate Square | (Soviet Union) Moscow | 138 m | 453 ft | 1953 |
| 9 | Hilton Moscow Leningradskaya | (Soviet Union) Moscow | 136 m | 446 ft | 1954 |
| 10 | Pirelli Building | (Italy) Milan | 127 m | 417 ft | 1958 |

== Timeline of tallest buildings ==
| Name | City | Country | Years tallest | Height | | Floors |
| Name | City | Country | Years tallest | Metres | Feet | Floors |
|---|---|---|---|---|---|---|
| Lakhta Center | Saint Petersburg | Russia | 2017–present | 462.5 | 1,517 | 87 |
| Federation: East Tower | Moscow | Russia | 2016–2017 | 373.7 | 1,226 | 95 |
| OKO: South Tower | Moscow | Russia | 2015–2016 | 354.1 | 1,162 | 85 |
| Mercury City Tower | Moscow | Russia | 2012–2014 | 338.8 | 1,112 | 75 |
| The Shard | London | UK | 2011–2012 | 309.6 | 1,016 | 87 |
| CoC: Moscow Tower | Moscow | Russia | 2009–2011 | 301.6 | 990 | 77 |
| Naberezhnaya Tower C | Moscow | Russia | 2007–2009 | 268.4 | 881 | 59 |
| Triumph-Palace | Moscow | Russia | 2005–2007 | 264.1 | 866 | 57 |
| Commerzbank Tower | Frankfurt | Germany | 1997–2005 | 259 | 850 | 56 |
| Messeturm | Frankfurt | Germany | 1990–1997 | 257 | 843 | 55 |
| Moscow State University | Moscow | Russia | 1953–1990 | 240 | 787 | 42 |
| Kotelnicheskaya Embankment Building | Moscow | Russia | 1952–1953 | 176 | 577 | 32 |
| Tour Perret | Amiens | France | 1949–1952 | 110 | 361 | 26 |
| Terrazza Martini Tower | Genoa | Italy | 1940–1949 | 108 | 354 | 31 |
| New Town Hall (Leipzig) | Leipzig | Germany | 1905–1940 | 114.8 | 377 | |
| Hamburg City Hall | Hamburg | Germany | 1897–1905 | 112 | 367 | |
| City Hall | Vienna | Austria | 1892–1897 | 105 | 344 | |
| Palace of Justice | Brussels | Belgium | 1883–1892 | 104 | 341 | |
| Victoria Tower | London | UK | 1860–1883 | 98.5 | 323 | |
| Augsburg Town Hall | Augsburg | Germany | 1624–1860 | 57 | 187 | 7 |

== See also ==
- List of tallest buildings in Europe
- List of tallest buildings in the World
