= List of tallest buildings in Europe =

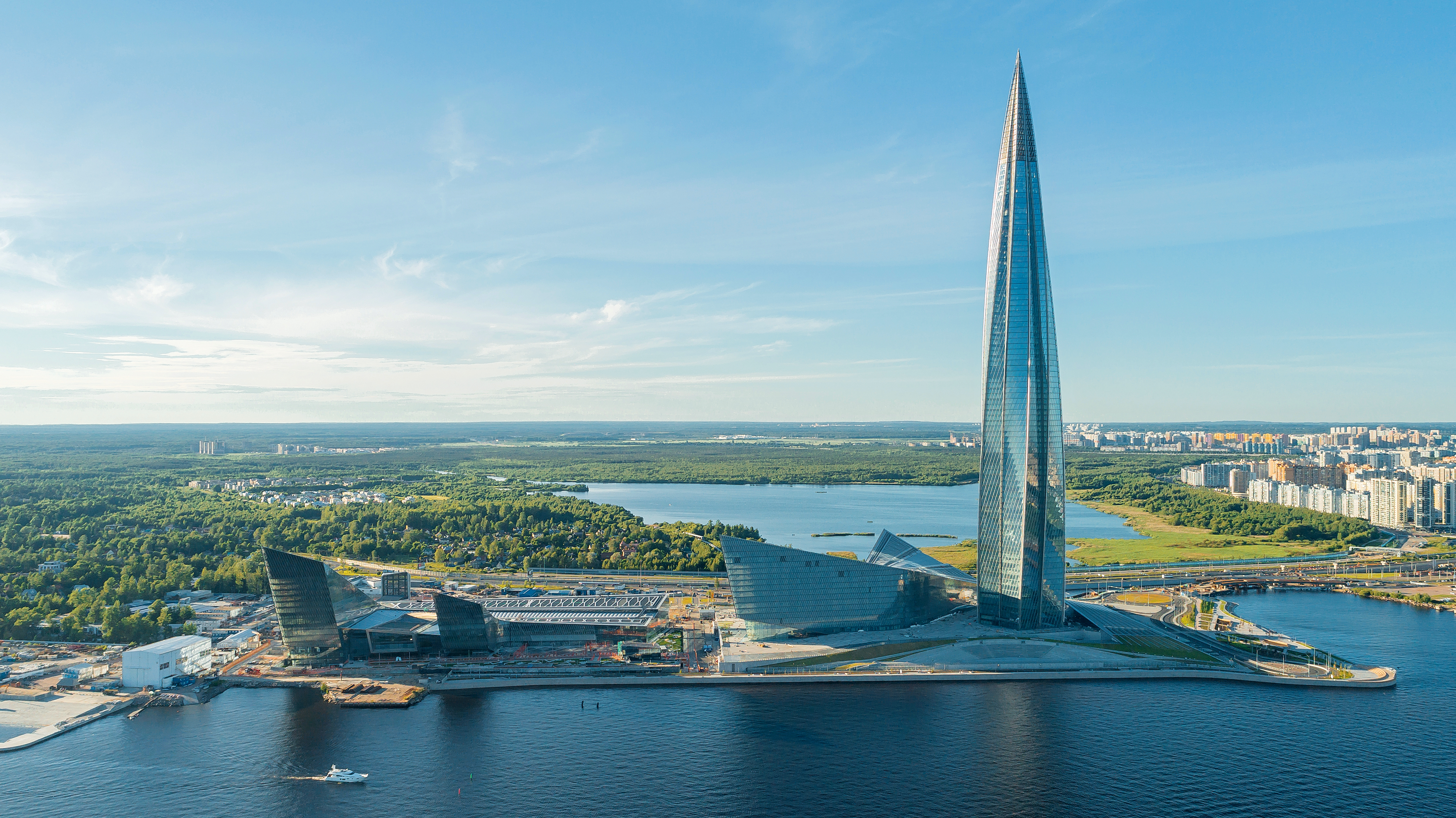
The Lakhta Center in Saint Petersburg is the tallest skyscraper in Europe.

This list of tallest buildings in Europe ranks skyscrapers in Europe by height exceeding 190 metres (623 ft). For decades, only a few major cities, such as Frankfurt, Istanbul, London, Moscow, Paris and Warsaw contained skyscrapers. In recent years, however, construction has spread to many other cities on the continent, including Madrid, Manchester, Milan, Lyon and Rotterdam. The tallest building in Europe is the Lakhta Center, located in Saint Petersburg, Russia.

As of 2026, one European city has 100 or more skyscrapers exceeding 150 metres (490 ft): Moscow (144). Six other European cities have 10 or more skyscrapers exceeding 150 metres (490 ft): Istanbul (56, out of a total of 77 skyscrapers),^{A} London (43), Paris (24), Frankfurt (20), Warsaw (20), and Manchester (11). Additionally, four cities in Europe have supertall skyscrapers: Moscow (6), Saint Petersburg (1), Warsaw (1), and London (1). Istanbul also has one supertall skyscraper, but it is located on the Asian side of the city.

== Tallest buildings ==
This list ranks skyscrapers in Europe that stand at least 190 metres (623 ft) tall, based on standard height measurements. Architectural details do not include antenna masts. Existing structures are included for ranking purposes based on present height. Many non-architectural extensions (such as radio antennas) are easily added and removed from tall buildings without significantly changing the style and design of the building, which is seen as a significant part of the value of these buildings.

† Was Europe's tallest building upon completion
Indicates buildings that have been architecturally topped out but are not yet completed

Rank	Name	Image	City	Country	Height m (ft)	Floors	Year	Notes	Ref.
1	Lakhta Center		Saint Petersburg	Russia	462.5 (1,517)	87	2019	Tallest building in Europe	
2	Federation: East Tower		Moscow	Russia	373.7 (1,226)	97	2017	Briefly the tallest building in Europe until completion of Lakhta Center.	
3	OKO: South Tower		Moscow	Russia	354.2 (1,162)	90	2015	Briefly the tallest building in Europe until completion of Federation: East Tower.	
4	Neva Tower: Tower 2		Moscow	Russia	345 (1,132)	79	2020	Tallest residential building in Europe.	
5	Mercury City Tower		Moscow	Russia	338.8 (1,112)	75	2013	Briefly the tallest building in Europe until completion of OKO: South Tower.	
6	Varso Tower		Warsaw	Poland	310 (1,017)	53	2022	Tallest building in the European Union.	
7	The Shard		London	United Kingdom	309.6 (1,016)	73	2012	Tallest building in the European Union until Brexit, and the completion of Varso Tower. Briefly the tallest building in Europe until completion of Mercury City Tower.	
8	Eurasia		Moscow	Russia	308.9 (1,013)	67	2015		
9	City of Capitals: Moscow Tower		Moscow	Russia	301.8 (990)	76	2010	Briefly the tallest building in Europe until completion of The Shard.	
10	Neva Tower: Tower 1		Moscow	Russia	297 (974)	65	2020		
11	Capital Towers: Park Tower		Moscow	Russia	295 (968)	70	2022		
11	Capital Towers: City Tower		Moscow	Russia	295 (968)	67	2022		
11	Capital Towers: River Tower		Moscow	Russia	295 (968)	67	2022		
14	National Space Center Tower		Moscow	Russia	288.1 (945)	46	2025		
15	Skyland İstanbul: Tower 1		Istanbul^{A}	Turkey	284 (932)	65	2017		
15	Skyland İstanbul: Tower 2		Istanbul^{A}	Turkey	284 (932)	64	2017		
17	Grand Tower		Moscow	Russia	283.4 (930)	62	2022		
18	22 Bishopsgate		London	United Kingdom	278.2 (913)	62	2020		
19	Five Towers		Moscow	Russia	274 (899)	75	2026		
20	Naberezhnaya Tower C		Moscow	Russia	268.4 (881)	61	2007		
21	Triumph Palace		Moscow	Russia	264.1 (866)	57	2005		
22	Istanbul Sapphire		Istanbul^{A}	Turkey	261 (856)	55	2010		
23	Commerzbank Tower		Frankfurt	Germany	259 (850)	56	1997		
24	City of Capitals: Saint Petersburg Tower		Moscow	Russia	257.2 (844)	65	2010		
25	Messeturm	framless	Frankfurt	Germany	256.5 (842)	55	1990		
26	iCity: Space Tower		Moscow	Russia	256 (840)	61	2023		
27	Torre de Cristal		Madrid	Spain	249 (817)	50	2008		
28	Torre Cepsa		Madrid	Spain	248.3 (815)	45	2008		
29	Karlatornet		Gothenburg	Sweden	247 (810)	74	2023		
30	Evolution Tower		Moscow	Russia	245.9 (807)	55	2015		
31	Federation: West Tower		Moscow	Russia	242.5 (796)	62	2007		
31	The Link		Paris	France	242 (794)	52	2026		
33	Moscow State University		Moscow	Russia	240 (787)	39	1953		
34	Imperia Tower	framless	Moscow	Russia	238.6 (783)	59	2011		
35	Palace of Culture and Science		Warsaw	Poland	237 (778)	42	1955		
36	One Canada Square		London	United Kingdom	236 (774)	50	1991		
36	Torre PwC		Madrid	Spain	236 (774)	52	2008		
38	Landmark Pinnacle		London	United Kingdom	233.2 (765)	75	2019		
39	Four I		Frankfurt	Germany	233 (764)	59	2025		
40	Tour First		Paris^{B}	France	231 (758)	56	2011		
41	Unicredit Tower		Milan	Italy	231 (758)	31	2012		
42	Heron Tower		London	United Kingdom	230 (755)	46	2011		
43	Torre Emperador		Madrid	Spain	228 (748)	57	2008		
44	Severny Port; Tower 7.3		Moscow	Russia	228 (748)	58	2028		
45	OKO: North Tower		Moscow	Russia	224.5 (737)	49	2014		
46	Level Yuzhnoportovaya; Tower 1		Moscow	Russia	224.4 (736)	69	2026		
46	Level Yuzhnoportovaya; Tower 3		Moscow	Russia	224.4 (736)	69	2027		
48	Leadenhall Building		London	United Kingdom	224 (735)	48	2014		
48	Olszynki Park		Rzeszów	Poland	220.67 (724)	42	2025		
50	DC Towers: Tower 1		Vienna	Austria	220 (722)	60	2013		
50	Nurol Life		Istanbul^{A}	Turkey	220 (722)	60	2017		
50	Istanbul Tower 205		Istanbul^{A}	Turkey	220 (722)	53	2018		
50	Warsaw Spire		Warsaw	Poland	220 (722)	49	2016		
50	Tour Hekla		Paris^{C}	France	220 (722)	41	2022		
55	Newfoundland		London	United Kingdom	219.7 (721)	58	2019		
56	Aspen at Consort Place		London	United Kingdom	215.8 (708)	64	2023		
57	Zalmhaventoren		Rotterdam	Netherlands	215 (705)	58	2022		
57	Sky Tower		Wrocław	Poland	215 (705)	51	2013		
57	South Quay Plaza I		London	United Kingdom	214.5 (704)	68	2018		
60	House on Mosfilmovskaya: Tower 1		Moscow	Russia	213.3 (700)	54	2011		
61	Tour Montparnasse		Paris	France	210 (689)	59	1972		
62	Allianz Tower		Milan	Italy	209.2 (686)	50	2015		
63	Westend Tower		Frankfurt	Germany	208 (682)	53	1993		
64	Hotel Ukraina		Moscow	Russia	206 (676)	34	1955		
65	Roche Tower 2		Basel	Switzerland	205 (673)	50	2022		
65	Piedmont Region Headquarters		Turin	Italy	205 (673)	42	2022		
67	One Park Drive		London	United Kingdom	204.9 (672)	57	2021		
68	8 Bishopsgate		London	United Kingdom	204 (669)	51	2022		
69	Millennium Tower		Vienna	Austria	202 (663)	50	1999		
70	Intempo		Benidorm	Spain	202.5 (664)	47	2021		
70	Spine Tower		Istanbul	Turkey	202 (663)	47	2013		
72	Deansgate Square South Tower		Manchester	United Kingdom	201 (659)	64	2019		
73	Warsaw Unit		Warsaw	Poland	200.7 (658)	46	2021		
74	Main Tower		Frankfurt	Germany	200 (656)	55	1999		
74	25 Canada Square		London	United Kingdom	200 (656)	45	2001		
74	Tower 185		Frankfurt	Germany	200 (656)	50	2011		
77	Tour Incity		Lyon	France	200 (656)	39	2015		
77	One Nine Elms City Tower		London	United Kingdom	200 (656)	58	2022		
77	MOD Dreiser Tower		Moscow	Russia	200 (656)	55	2023		
77	MOD Mann Tower		Moscow	Russia	200 (656)	55	2023		
77	Obrucheva 30, Tower 1		Moscow	Russia	200 (656)	60	2026		
77	Jois, Tower Anna		Moscow	Russia	200 (656)	57	2027		
83	8 Canada Square		London	United Kingdom	199.5 (655)	45	2002		
84	Will Towers, Tower 3		Moscow	Russia	199 (653)	56	2023		
85	Fili City, Famous Tower		Moscow	Russia	198.1 (650)	57	2025		
86	Upside Towers, Elbrus Tower		Moscow	Russia	198 (650)	57	2026		
87	Veer 1, Tower 5		Moscow	Russia	198 (650)	59	2028		
88	Veer 1, Tower 6		Moscow	Russia	198 (650)	59	2028		
89	Wellton Towers 2		Moscow	Russia	195.2 (640)	58	2020		
90	Skyliner		Warsaw	Poland	195 (640)	45	2021		
90	Queen Central Park		Istanbul	Turkey	195 (640)	52	2018		
92	Anthill Residence 1		Istanbul	Turkey	194.5 (638)	54	2011		
92	Anthill Residence 2		Istanbul	Turkey	194.5 (638)	54	2011		
94	Tour Majunga		Paris^{C}	France	194 (636)	45	2014		
94	Ciftci Tower A		Istanbul	Turkey	194 (636)	45	2018		
94	Ciftci Tower B		Istanbul	Turkey	194 (636)	45	2018		
94	Tricolor: Tower A		Moscow	Russia	194 (636)	58	2013		
98	Sberbank City: Tower A		Moscow	Russia	193 (633)	47	2015		
99	Harcourt Gardens		London	United Kingdom	192 (630)	56	2024		
100	Złota 44		Warsaw	Poland	192 (630)	54	2012		
101	Generali Tower		Milan	Italy	191.5 (628)	44	2018		
102	Continental		Moscow	Russia	191 (627)	48	2011		
102	D1: Kingchess Tower		Moscow	Russia	191 (627)	59	2020		
102	D1: Excelsior Tower		Moscow	Russia	191 (627)	59	2020		
105	ONE		Frankfurt	Germany	190.9 (627)	49	2022		
106	HSB Turning Torso		Malmö	Sweden	190 (623)	57	2005		
106	Tricolor: Tower B		Moscow	Russia	190 (623)	56	2013		
106	The Scalpel		London	United Kingdom	190 (623)	38	2018		
106	Symphony 34: Graphite Tower		Moscow	Russia	190 (623)	54	2023		
106	Omniturm		Frankfurt	Germany	189.9 (623)	45	2019		

== Timeline of tallest buildings ==
Name	City	Country	Years tallest	Height		Floors
Name	City	Country	Years tallest	Metres	Feet	Floors
Lakhta Center	Saint Petersburg	Russia	2017–present	462.5	1,517	87
Federation: East Tower	Moscow	Russia	2016-2017	373.7	1,226	97
OKO: South Tower	Moscow	Russia	2015–2016	354.1	1,162	85
Mercury City Tower	Moscow	Russia	2012–2014	338.8	1,112	75
The Shard	London	United Kingdom	2011–2012	309.6	1,016	87
CoC: Moscow Tower	Moscow	Russia	2009–2011	301.6	990	77
Naberezhnaya Tower C	Moscow	Russia	2007–2009	268.4	881	59
Triumph Palace	Moscow	Russia	2005–2007	264.1	866	57
Commerzbank Tower	Frankfurt	Germany	1997–2005	259	850	56
Messeturm	Frankfurt	Germany	1990–1997	257	843	55
Moscow State University	Moscow	Russia	1953–1990	240	787	42
Kotelnicheskaya Embankment Building	Moscow	Russia	1952–1953	176	577	32
Terrazza Martini Tower	Genoa	Italy	1940–1952	108	354	31
Royal Liver Building	Liverpool	United Kingdom	1911–1940	98 (clock towers)	322	13
Witte Huis	Rotterdam	Netherlands	1898–1904	43	141	10

== Under construction, approved and proposed ==
Construction on hold

Name	City	Country	Height	Floors	Estimated completion	Status
Lakhta Center 2	Saint Petersburg	Russia	703 m (2,306 ft)	146	2035	Under construction
Wildberries Tower	Moscow	Russia	440 m (1,440 ft)	80	2030	Under construction
Akhmat Tower	Grozny	Russia	435 m (1,427 ft)	102	(On-hold)	On hold
Aurus, Tower 1	Moscow	Russia	395 m (1,296 ft)	96	2031	Under construction
One Tower	Moscow	Russia	379 m (1,243 ft)	91	2030	Under construction
Aurus, Tower 2	Moscow	Russia	343.6 m (1,127 ft)	85	2031	Under construction
Dom Dau	Moscow	Russia	340 m (1,120 ft)	87	2027	Under construction
Torre Madrid Nuevo Norte 1	Madrid	Spain	330 (or 340) m (1,082 ft)	77	2030	Under construction
Slava, Tower 5	Moscow	Russia	310 m (1,020 ft)	65		Approved
Tirana Society Towers	Tirana	Albania	300 m (980 ft)			Proposed
TPU Park Pobedy, Residential Tower	Moscow	Russia	300 m (980 ft)			Approved
Top Tower	Moscow	Russia	298.8 m (980 ft)	64	2029	Under construction
Grand Park Skyline I	Tirana	Albania	266 m (873 ft)	71		Approved
Torre Madrid Nuevo Norte 2	Madrid	Spain	265 m (869 ft)		2030	Under construction
Stone Khodynka, Tower F1	Moscow	Russia	255 m (837 ft)	55	2032	Under construction
Alana's Tower	Tirana	Albania	250 m (820 ft)	62		Approved
Kutuzovskiy Prospekt, Tower 1	Moscow	Russia	250 m (820 ft)	65	2037	Under construction
Kutuzovskiy Prospekt, Tower 2	Moscow	Russia	250 m (820 ft)	65	2037	Under construction
Sezar Tower	Moscow	Russia	249 m (817 ft)	52	2030	Under construction
Elbtower	Hamburg	Germany	245 m (804 ft)	57	(On hold)	On hold
Torre Madrid Nuevo Norte 3	Madrid	Spain	240 (787)		2030	Under construction
Level Zvenigorodskaya, Tower 3	Moscow	Russia	240 m (790 ft)	66		Proposed
RZhD, Tower 1	Moscow	Russia	240 m (790 ft)			Proposed
Veer 2, Tower 3	Moscow	Russia	237 m (778 ft)	70	2029	Under construction
Vysotka na Zhukova	Moscow	Russia	233 m (764 ft)	49	2029	Under construction
FM Tower	Pristina	Kosovo	230 m (750 ft)	47		Under construction
TM Tower	Benidorm	Spain	230 m (750 ft)	64	2028	Under construction
Level Yuzhnoportovaya, Tower 10	Moscow	Russia	225 m (738 ft)	69	2029	Under construction
Bell	Moscow	Russia	225 m (738 ft)	50	2029	Under construction
Ice Towers, Tower 1	Moscow	Russia	224 m (735 ft)	58	2028	Under construction
Torre Chamartín I (part of MNN)	Madrid	Spain	220 m (721 ft)		2030	Under construction
Kod Sokolniki, Tower 1	Moscow	Russia	220 m (720 ft)	55	2030	Proposed
Ultima City, Tower 7	Moscow	Russia	220 m (720 ft)	56		Proposed
Ice Towers, Tower 2	Moscow	Russia	217 m (712 ft)	57	2028	Under construction
Zilart, Tower 24	Moscow	Russia	216.5 m (710 ft)			Proposed
Tower on Butyrsky Val	Moscow	Russia	215 m (705 ft)			Under construction
High Rise Tower	Tirana	Albania	212 m (696 ft)	47		Approved
Severny Port, Tower 6.4	Moscow	Russia	212 m (696 ft) (approx.)	54	2030	Proposed
Era, Tower 1	Moscow	Russia	210 m (690 ft)	54	2029	Under construction
Nachalo	Moscow	Russia	210 m (690 ft)	48	2030	Under construction
Level Nizhegorodskaya, Tower 2	Moscow	Russia	209.6 m (688 ft)	58		Proposed
Level Nizhegorodskaya, Tower 3	Moscow	Russia	209.6 m (688 ft)	58		Proposed
Paveletskaya City	Moscow	Russia	206.7 m (678 ft)	56		Proposed
Mount Tirana	Tirana	Albania	206.4 m (677 ft)	58	2030	Under construction
Reeds Towers	Tirana	Albania	205 m (673 ft)	60		Approved
Papuli Tower	Tirana	Albania	205 m (673 ft)	58		Approved
Central Business Tower	Frankfurt	Germany	205 m (673 ft)	52	2028	Under construction
Ice Towers, Tower 3	Moscow	Russia	205 m (673 ft)	53	2028	Under construction
Lana Riverside Tower	Tirana	Albania	204.45 m (670.8 ft)	56		Under construction
Barcelona Tower	Tirana	Albania	202 m (663 ft)	53		Approved
Sky Fort Business Center	Sofia	Bulgaria	202 m (663 ft)	52	2026	Under construction
Amber City, Tower 5	Moscow	Russia	200 m (660 ft) (approx.)	57	2028	Under construction
Sydney City, Tower 1	Moscow	Russia	200 m (660 ft)	55		Proposed
Kutuzovskiy Prospekt, Tower 3	Moscow	Russia	200 m (660 ft)	53	2037	Under construction
Kutuzovskiy Prospekt, Tower 4	Moscow	Russia	200 m (660 ft)	53	2037	Under construction
Sezar Future	Moscow	Russia	200 m (660 ft)	59	2029	Under construction
Upside Towers, Everest Tower	Moscow	Russia	200 m (660 ft)	58	2027	Under construction
RZhD, Tower 2	Moscow	Russia	200 m (660 ft)			Proposed
Fort, Tower 1	Moscow	Russia	200 m (660 ft)		2034	Approved
Fort, Tower 2	Moscow	Russia	200 m (660 ft)		2034	Approved
Towers on Novodanilovskaya Embankment, Tower 1	Moscow	Russia	200 m (660 ft) (approx.)	53	2030	Proposed
MyPriority Presnya	Moscow	Russia	199.65 m (655.0 ft)	42	2029	Under construction
Bond Tower	Tirana	Albania	199.5 m (655 ft)	55		Under construction
City Bay, Pacific Tower 1	Moscow	Russia	199 m (653 ft)	59	2028	Under construction
City Bay, Pacific Tower 4	Moscow	Russia	199 m (653 ft)	59	2028	Under construction
Set, Tower 2	Moscow	Russia	199 m (653 ft)	59	2028	Under construction
Set, Tower A	Moscow	Russia	199 m (653 ft) (approx.)	59	2028	Under construction
Level Zvenigorodskaya, Tower 1	Moscow	Russia	199 m (653 ft)	65	2028	Under construction
Riviera Tower	Athens	Greece	198 m (650 ft)	50	2026	Under construction
Hard Rock Hotel & Casino	Athens	Greece	197 m (646 ft)	42	2026	Under construction
Indy Towers, Tower D1	Moscow	Russia	195.7 m (642 ft)	55	2029	Under construction
Amber City, Tower 3	Moscow	Russia	194 m (636 ft)	55	2029	Proposed
Stone Blick, Tower A	Moscow	Russia	193 m (633 ft)	50	2030	Under construction
Grand Park Skyline II	Tirana	Albania	192 m (630 ft)	51		Approved

== See also ==
- List of tallest structures in Europe
- List of tallest buildings in Europe by year
- List of tallest buildings in the Balkans
- List of tallest buildings in Africa
- List of tallest buildings in Asia
- List of tallest buildings in Oceania
- List of tallest buildings in Scandinavia
- List of tallest buildings

== Notes ==
- ^A Only skyscrapers located in the European part of Istanbul are included. See Europe for more details.
- ^B Specifically located in the La Défense district, commune of Courbevoie, in the inner suburbs of Paris
- ^C Specifically located in the La Défense district, commune of Puteaux, in the inner suburbs of Paris
