= Triumph Palace =

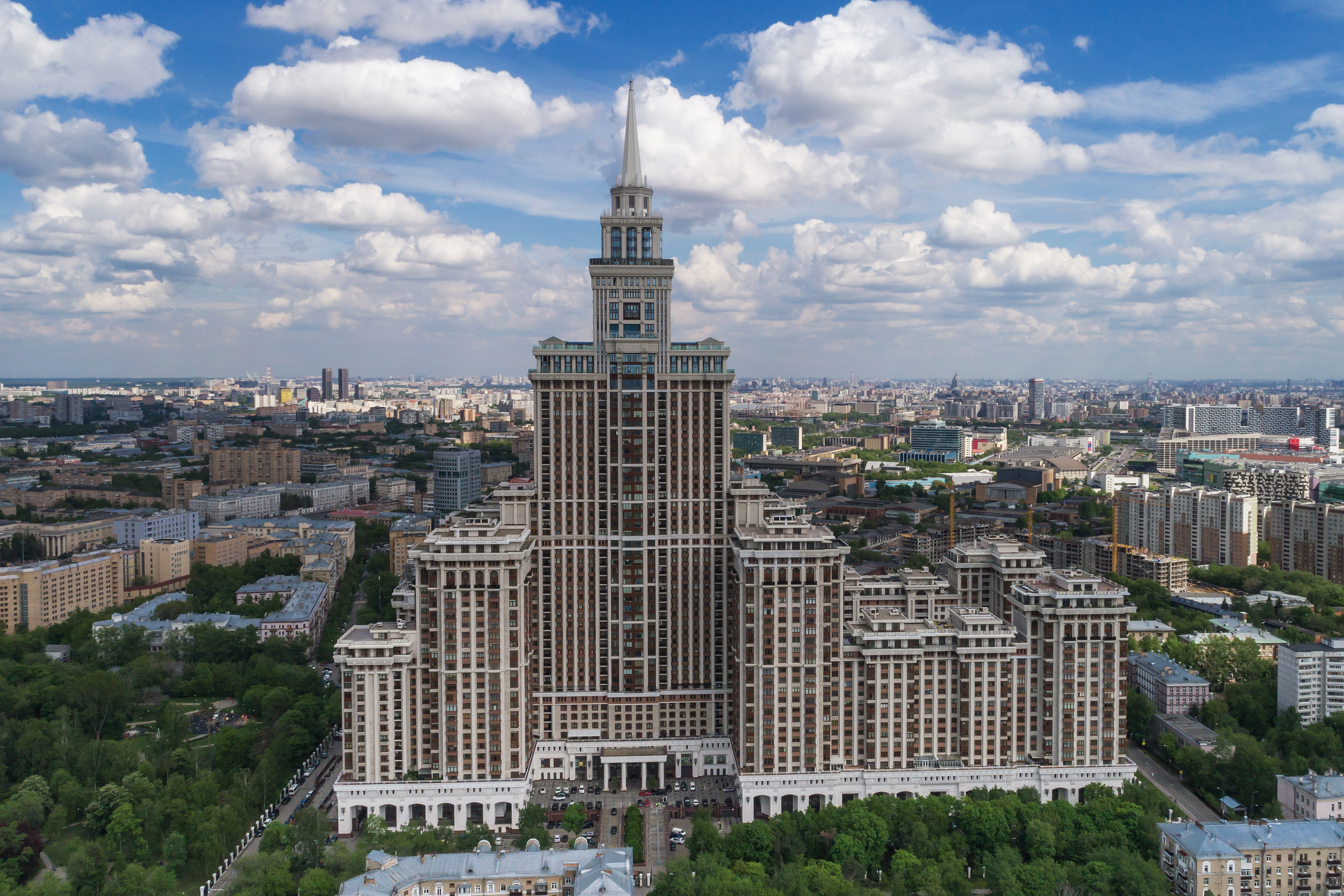
- Triumph Palace
- Location in Moscow

General information
- Type: Residential
- Location: Chapayevsky Pereulok, 3 Moscow, Russia
- Coordinates: 55°47′54″N 37°31′15″E
- Construction started: 2001
- Completed: 2006

Height
- Roof: 264.1 metres (866 ft)

Technical details
- Floor count: 57
- Floor area: 168,633 square metres (1,815,150 sq ft)

Triumph Palace (Russian: Триу́мф-Пала́с, transliterated as Triumf Palas) is the tallest apartment building in Moscow and all of Europe. It is sometimes called the Eighth Sister because it is similar in appearance to the Seven Sisters skyscrapers built in Moscow under Joseph Stalin through the 1950s. Construction began in 2001 and was completed in 2006.

The 57-storey building, containing 987 apartments, was topped out on 20 December 2003, making it Europe's and Russia's tallest skyscraper at 264.1 metres (866 ft) until the inauguration in 2007 of Moscow's 268-metre Naberezhnaya Tower block C.

Triumph Palace is featured in detail in the 2009 Channel 4 series Vertical City (series 1, episode 8).

== Residents ==
Russian figures Dima Bilan, Marina Abrosimova, Alsu Abramova, Marina Zudina (theater and film actress), Alexey Pushkov (member of the Federation Council), Maxim Fadeev (producer) have apartments in Triumph Palace.

== See also ==
- List of skyscrapers
- List of skyscrapers in Europe

Records
Preceded by Commerzbank Tower	Tallest building in Europe; 2003–2007	Succeeded by Naberezhnaya Tower
Preceded by Main building of Moscow State University	Tallest building in the former Soviet Union; 2003–2007	Succeeded by Naberezhnaya Tower
Preceded by Main building of Moscow State University	Tallest building in Russia; 2003–2007	Succeeded by Naberezhnaya Tower
Preceded by Main building of Moscow State University	Tallest building in Moscow; 2003–2007	Succeeded by Naberezhnaya Tower
