= Naberezhnaya Tower =

- Башня на Набережной
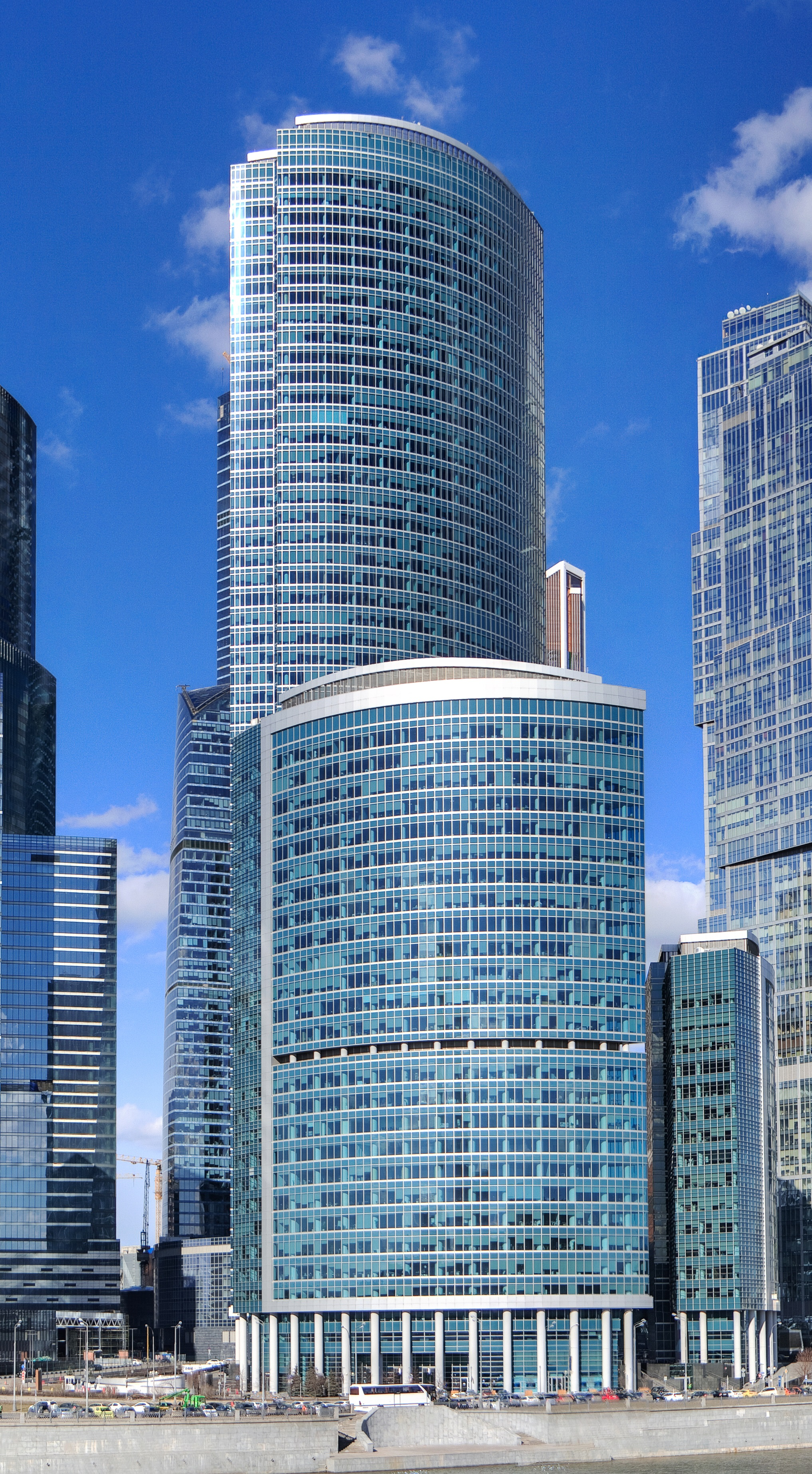
- Interactive map of the Naberezhnaya Tower area

General information
- Status: Completed
- Type: Office
- Architectural style: Postmodernism
- Location: Moscow International Business Center, Moscow, Russia
- Coordinates: 55°44′48″N 37°32′13″E
- Construction started: 2003
- Completed: 2007
- Owner: City Center Investment B.V.

Height
- Antenna spire: 285 m (935 ft)
- Roof: Tower A: 85 m (279 ft); Tower B: 127 m (417 ft); Tower C: 268 m (879 ft)

Technical details
- Floor count: Tower A: 17; Tower B: 27; Tower C: 59
- Floor area: 254,000 m^{2} (2,730,000 sq ft)
- Lifts/elevators: 45

Design and construction
- Architects: RTKL Associates; Enka Design
- Developer: Enka
- Structural engineer: Thornton-Tomasetti Engineers; Enka Design
- Main contractor: Enka

Naberezhnaya Tower (Russian: Башня на Hабережной, romanized: Bashnya na Naberezhnoy, literally means Tower on the Embankment) is an office complex composed of two skyscrapers and a high-rise located on plot 10 in the Moscow International Business Center (MIBC) in Moscow, Russia with a total area of 254,000 m^{2} (2,730,000 sq ft). The buildings are named after the first three letters of the alphabet and from the lowest height to the tallest: the 17-story tall Tower A, the 27-story tall Tower B, and the 59-story tall Tower C. Construction of the complex started in 2003, with Tower A being completed in 2004, Tower B in 2005, and Tower C in 2007.

Tower C is the tallest building out of the complex, with a height of 268.4 metres (881 ft) and 59 stories. It is formerly the tallest building in Russia and Europe, surpassing the Triumph Palace, also in Moscow, in August 2007. Tower C was surpassed by its neighboring skyscraper Moscow Tower of the City of Capitals complex as the tallest building in July 2008.

== History ==
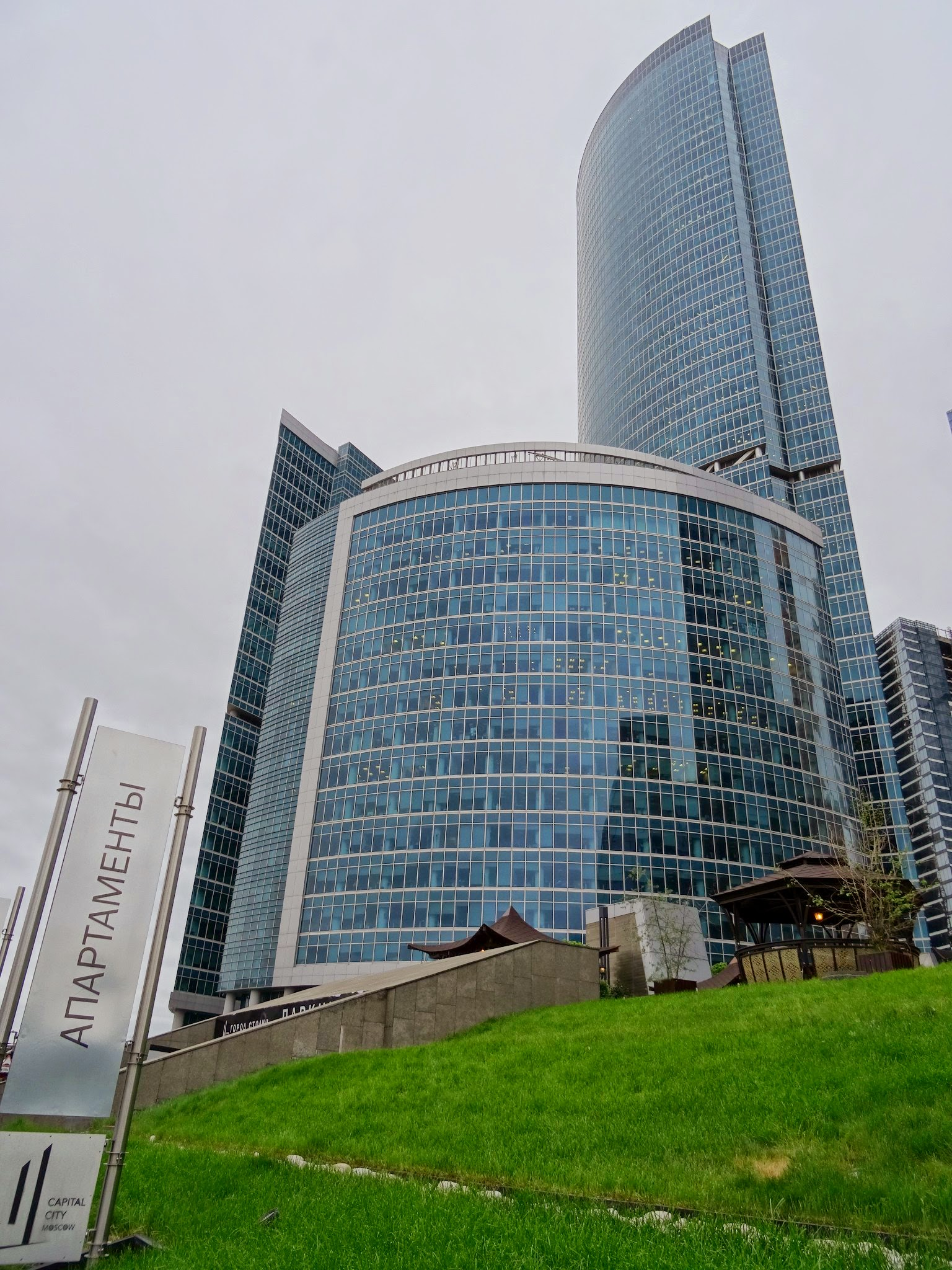
Naberezhnaya Tower from the ground

In the summer of 2003, the Turkish company Enka started construction of the 17-story Tower A, designed by architects Inan Vehbi and Ertürk Olcay. Tower A, covering a total area of 39,800 m^{2} (428,000 sq ft) and standing 85 metres (279 ft), opened on 11 October 2004. Since the Naberezhnaya Tower was divided into three stages, Enka was able to start construction earlier, postponing construction of the tallest building in the complex, Tower C. Tower A became the first building completed in the central area of the MIBC. Due to the demand, the developer managed to sell all of available office space 4 months before the opening of Tower A.

Construction of Tower B started in the same year as Tower A. Tower B, covering a total area of 29,202 m^{2} (314,330 sq ft) and standing 135.7 metres (445 ft), opened in 2006. By the beginning of 2007, when the Naberezhnaya Tower was still the only operating complex in the central area of the MIBC, Tower A and Tower B were occupied by about 40 companies, including Alcoa, Citibank, IBM, GE, KPMG, Lucent, and Procter & Gamble. However, tenants faced the underdeveloped infrastructure of the MIBC that was currently under construction and the fact that 7,000 of their workers only have 1200 parking spaces in a 4-level underground parking lot.

Construction of Tower C started in 2005, way later than Tower A and Tower B. It was completed in 2007. Standing 268.4 metres (881 ft) tall, the 59-story skyscraper surpassed the Triumph Palace, also in Moscow, by four meters as the tallest building in Russia and Europe. Tower C kept its rank until the neighboring Moscow Tower of the City of Capitals complex surpassed it in July 2008 as the tallest in Russia and Europe. The building includes 1,100 m^{2} (12,000 sq ft) of retail space and 108,000 m^{2} (1,160,000 sq ft) of leased space.

Possessing its own production base, Enka did not use a loan and built the Naberezhnaya Tower using its own funds. The total investment is estimated at $200 million. By the beginning of the Great Recession, almost all the areas in the complex had already been opened.

== Construction gallery ==
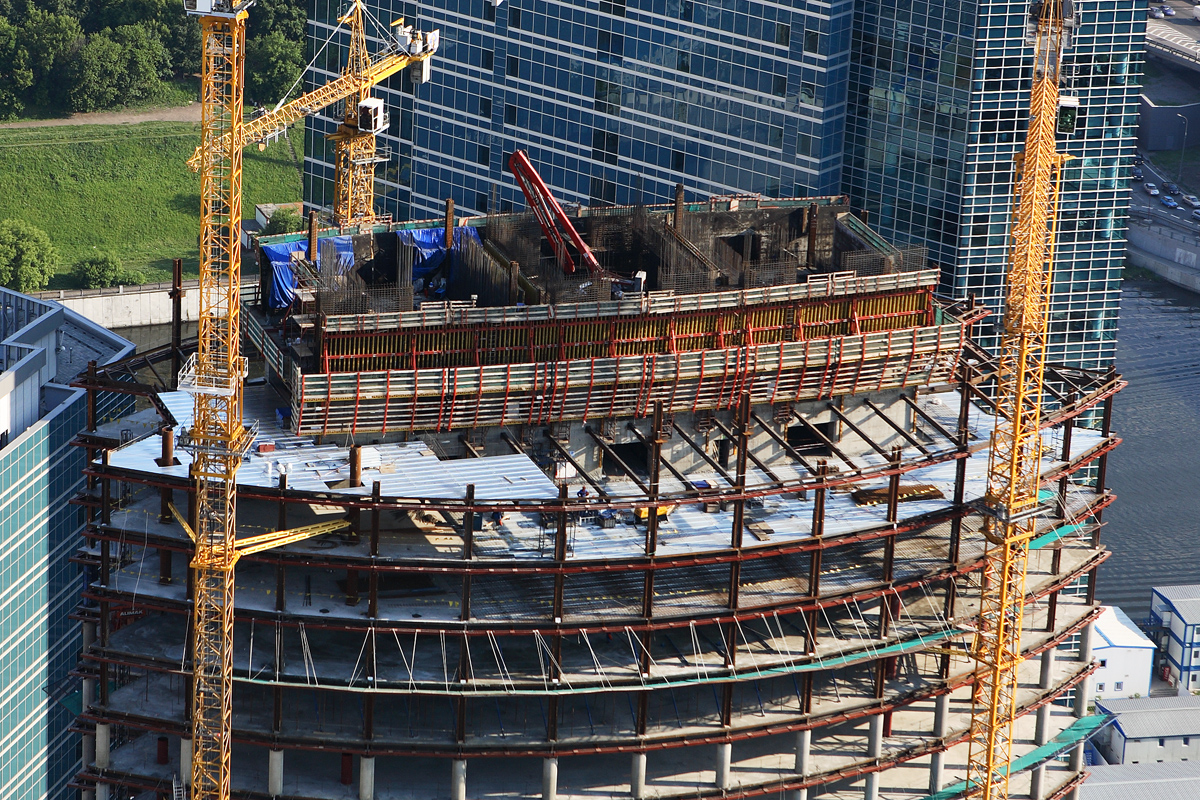
Tower C, 20 June 2006

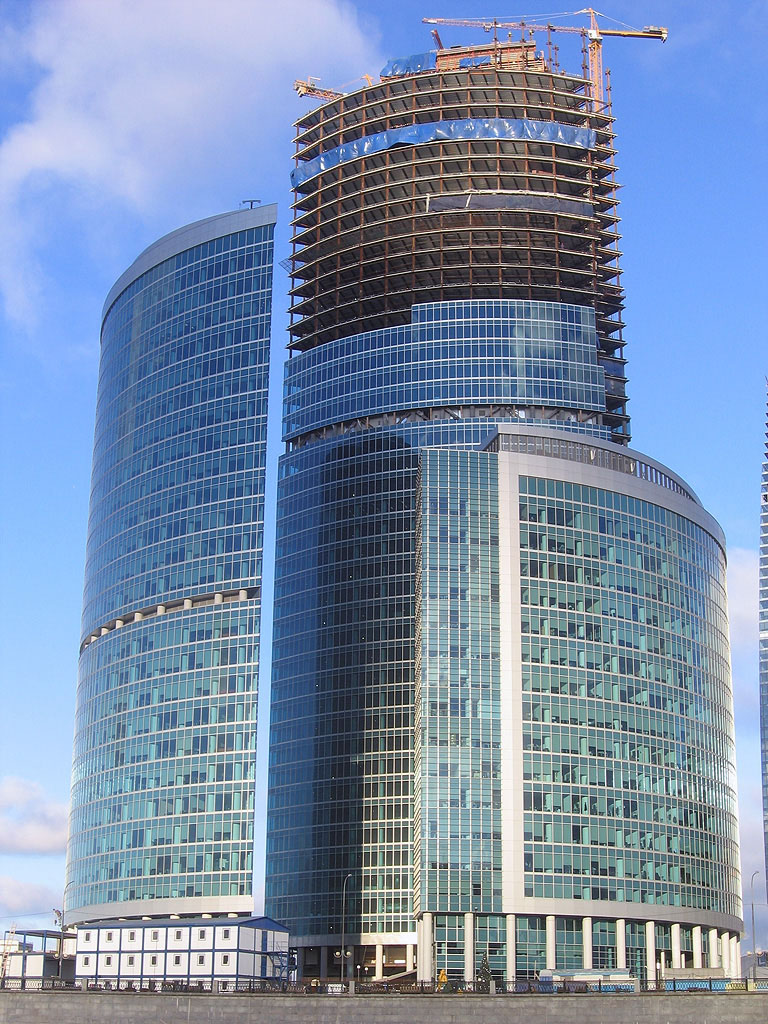
19 December 2006

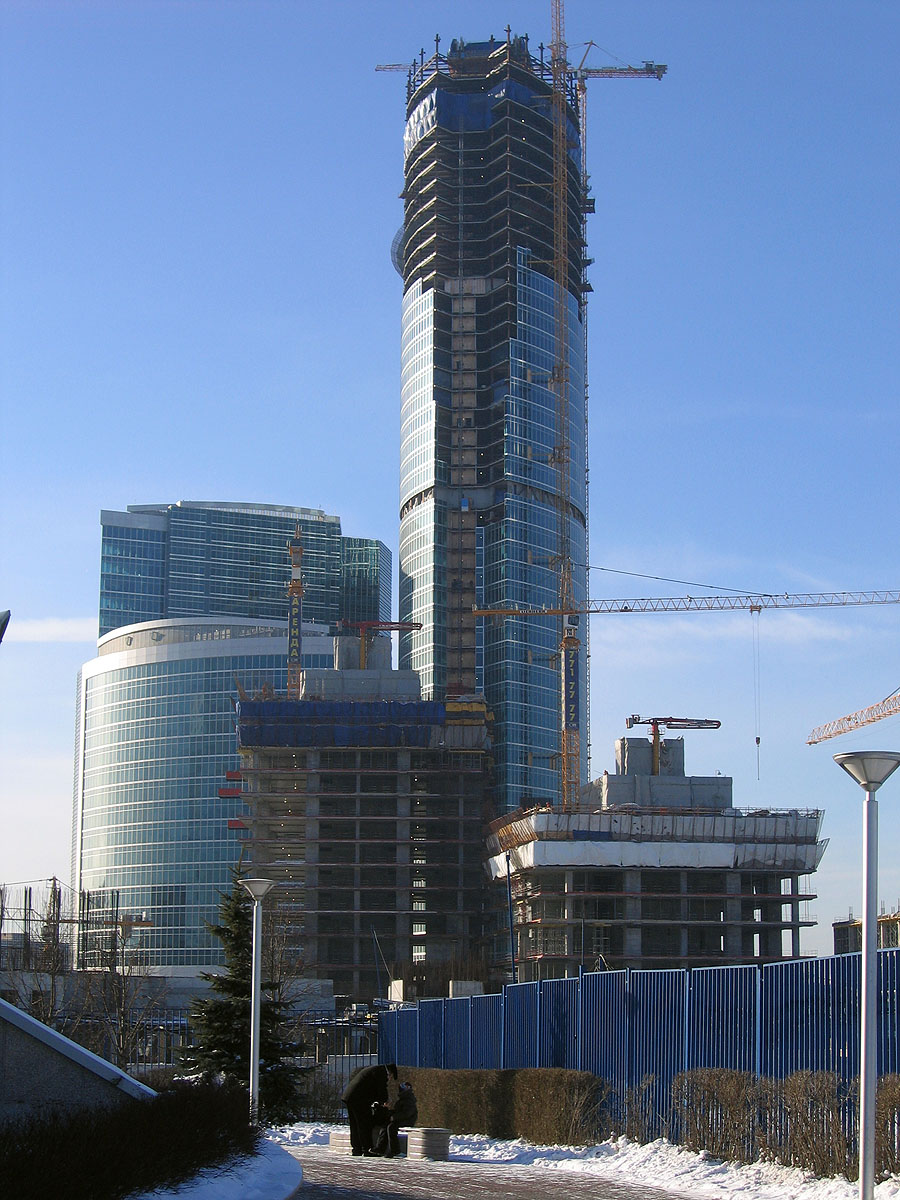
30 January 2007

== See also ==
- List of tallest buildings in Moscow
- List of tallest buildings in Russia
- List of tallest buildings in Europe
- List of tallest structures in the former Soviet Union

Records
Preceded by Triumph Palace	Tallest Building in Europe; 2007—2009; 268 m	Succeeded by City of Capitals
Preceded by Triumph Palace	Tallest Building in the Former Soviet Union; 2007—2009; 268 m	Succeeded by City of Capitals
Preceded by Triumph Palace	Tallest Building in Russia; 2007—2009; 268 m	Succeeded by City of Capitals
Preceded by Triumph Palace	Tallest Building in Moscow; 2007—2009; 268 m	Succeeded by City of Capitals
