= City of Capitals =

Mixed-use complex in Moscow, Russia

- Город Столиц
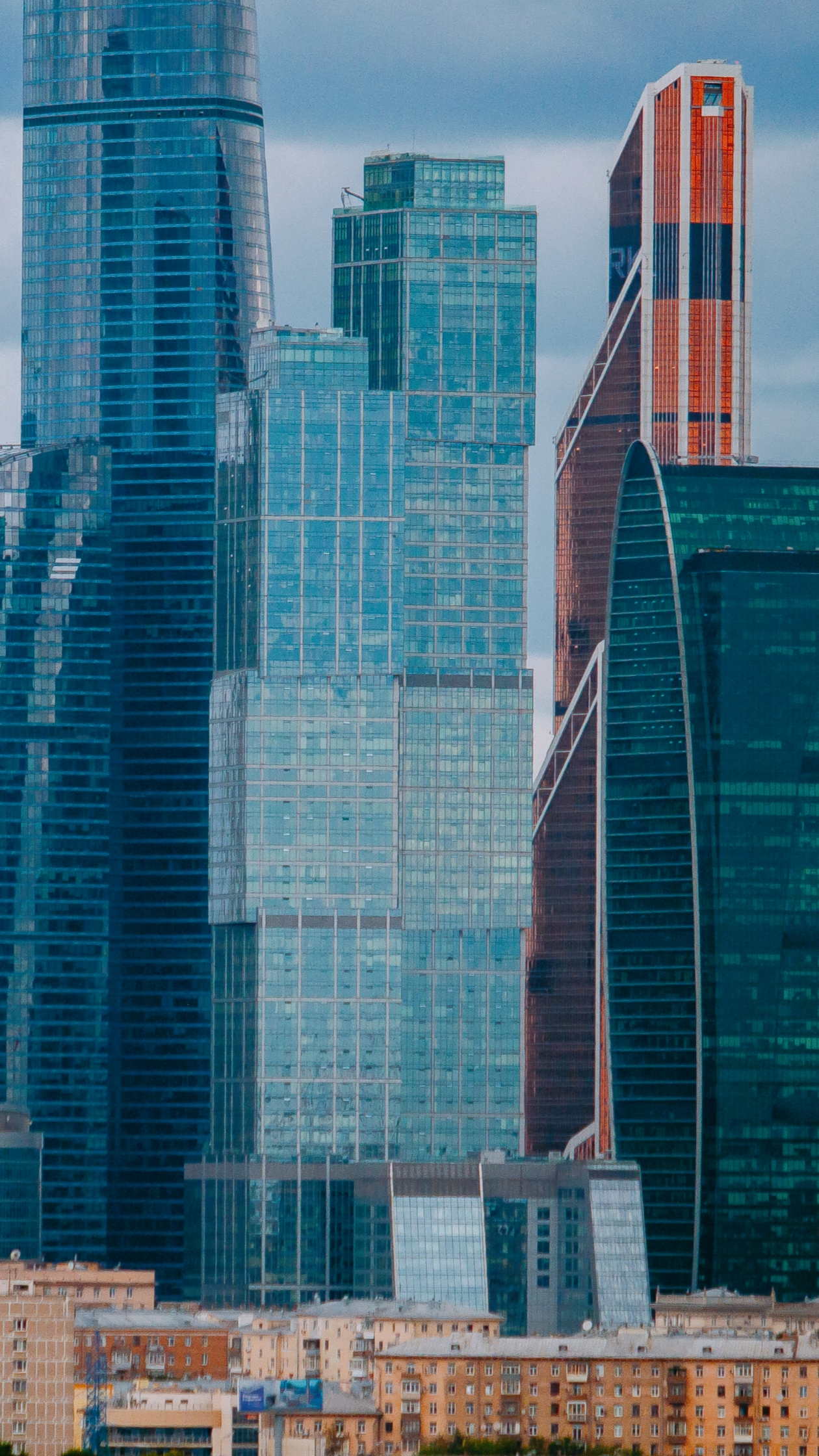
- Interactive map of the City of Capitals area
- Alternative names: Capital City

General information
- Status: Completed
- Type: Mixed-use
- Architectural style: Deconstructivism
- Location: Moscow International Business Center, Moscow, Russia
- Coordinates: 55°44′50″N 37°32′20″E
- Construction started: 18 August 2005
- Completed: 5 March 2010
- Cost: RUB73.641 billion US$1 billion
- Owner: Capital Group

Height
- Architectural: Moscow: 301.6 m (989.5 ft); St. Petersburg: 256.9 m (842.8 ft)
- Antenna spire: Moscow: 309.8 m (1,016.4 ft); St. Petersburg: 257.2 m (843.8 ft)
- Top floor: Moscow: 300.8 m (986.9 ft); St. Petersburg: 250.1 m (820.5 ft)

Technical details
- Floor count: Moscow: 76; St. Petersburg: 65
- Floor area: 288,680 m^{2} (3,107,300 sq ft)
- Lifts/elevators: 8

Design and construction
- Architect: NBBJ
- Developer: Capital Group
- Structural engineer: Arup
- Main contractor: Ant Yapi Sanayi ve Ticaret A.Ş.

Website
- www.antyapi.com.tr/en/projeler/capital-city/

The City of Capitals (Russian: Город Столиц, romanized: Gorod Stolits) is a mixed-use complex composed of two skyscrapers and an office building located on plot 9 in the Moscow International Business Center in Moscow, Russia with a total area of 288,680 square metres (3,107,300 ft^{2}). The two skyscrapers are named after the two historical capitals of Russia: Moscow and Saint Petersburg. Construction of the complex began in 2005, with the office building completed in 2008 and the two skyscrapers completed in 2009.

Moscow Tower is the taller of the two skyscrapers, with a height of 301.6 metres (990 ft) and 73 stories, surpassing the Naberezhnaya Tower as the tallest building in Russia and Europe in 2008, until it was surpassed by The Shard in London, United Kingdom in 2012. St. Petersburg Tower has a height of 256.9 metres (843 ft) and 65 stories while the office building serves as a stylobate with a height of 76 metres (249 ft) with 18 floors. As of 2022, Moscow Tower is the eighth-tallest building in Russia and the 21st-tallest residential building in the world.

== History ==
Construction of the complex was first proposed in 2003. Due to the Capital City complex needed to be built in a quick schedule, a design team was gathered from a span of 11 time zones from Seattle to Moscow. An obstacle for planning of the skyscraper was the absence of applicable local building codes since the current codes dated back to 1950 did not apply for tall buildings. As a result, codes of the complex were modeled off after British standards, which established high standards for fire safety, such as 4-hour structural fire resistance and the use of 30-minute fire-rated glass. According to the schedule, NBBJ and the Arup Group were to focus on completing the structural design while the architectural design was being worked on. After this was completed, the design team worked with the Moscow government to fulfill the building codes for the complex.

Construction of the complex started in 2005. The office building which served as a stylobate for the complex was completed in 2008. In July 2008, the Moscow Tower surpassed the Naberezhnaya Tower as the tallest building in Russia and Europe. In 2009, construction of the complex was completed. In 2012, The Shard in London, United Kingdom surpassed Moscow Tower as the tallest building in Europe, but only held that position for a few months as the Capital City complex's neighboring Mercury City Tower surpassed The Shard's height.

== Design ==
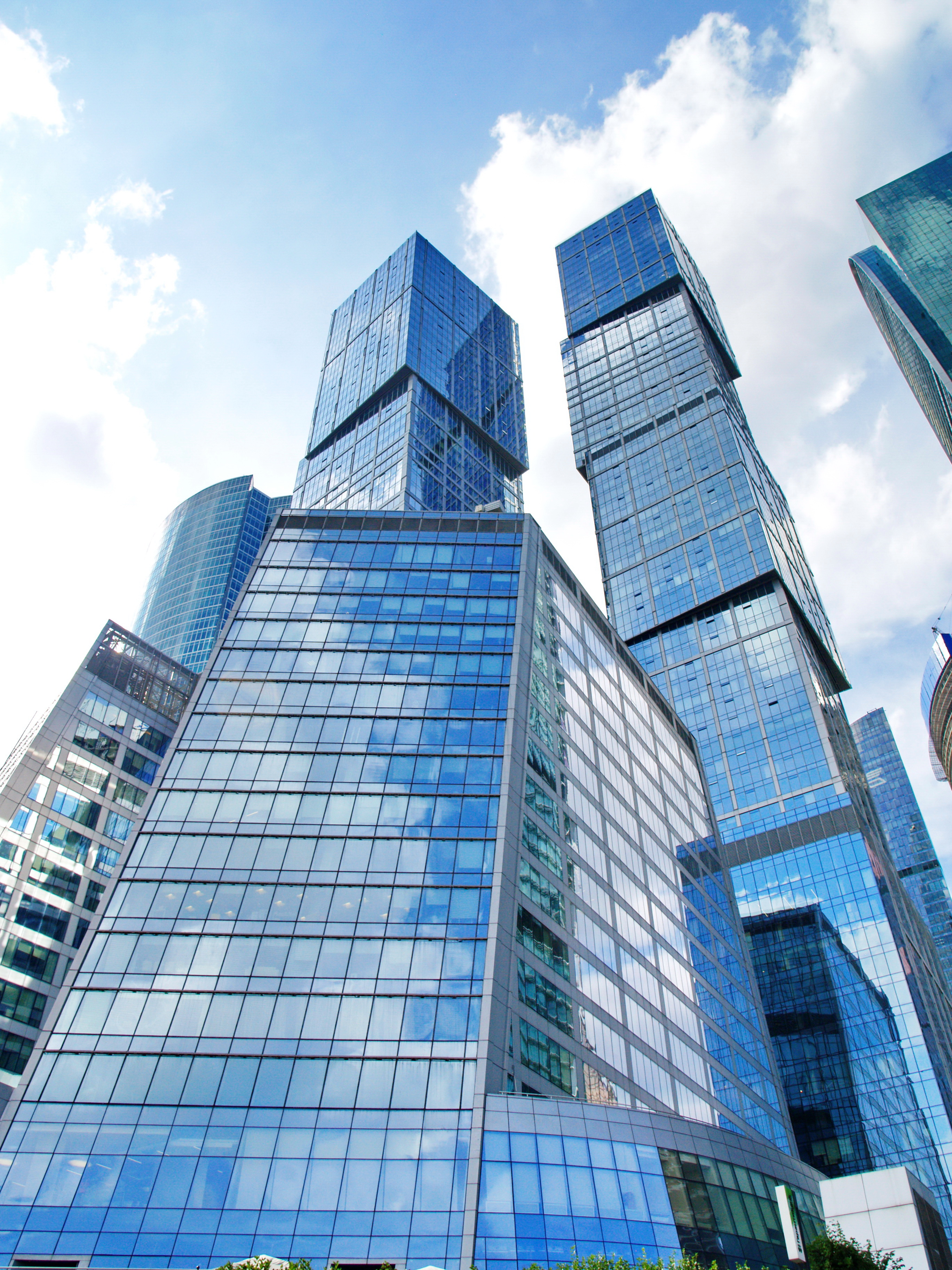
City of Capitals from the ground

According to Yuri Starodubtsev of the Capital Group and Joey Myers and Larry Goetz of the NBBJ, the design complex of the Capital City complex was inspired after Vladimir Tatlin's "Corner Counter Relief" (1914). Tatlin's work in the early 20th century was to redesign the project in order to accommodate more space. One concept approached by Tatlin was a tightly drawn interstitial shape through the orthogonal geometry of a typical room. The Capital City complex uses this concept by the offset rotation of the tower segments to create a dynamic departure from the square's stability. This rotational effect, achieved through a slight cantilever on only two façades of each vertical segment, does not compromise the regularity of the towers' structure.

Reinforced concrete is to be used for the foundation due to its abundance in the region. Despite this, construction of the complex was carried out in atypical conditions. The tower pile caps were each installed during continuous, 33-hour mid-winter pours in temperatures ranging from −32 to −34 °C (−26 to −29 °F), under a large heated tent to keep the concrete from freezing. Running five meters deep and measuring 6,500 and 6,000 cubic meters (230,000 and 210,000 ft^{3}), the foundation utilized a relatively standard rebar cage and wooden form work.

The design team collaborated with German curtain wall specialist Schüco to create a dynamic facade for the towers and podium building. The towers are enclosed in a unitized panel system with four-sided structural-silicone glazing. The aluminum panels compose a shifting super grid that resonates with the towers' shifting blocks. The panels also shift in plan, some protruding outward while others are slightly inset to accommodate vertical LED lighting.

The City of Capitals is to serve as a mixed-use complex, featuring apartments, office space, retail, restaurants, fitness center, and a garden. The complex also features a six-level basement that includes more than 2,200 parking spaces, electrical equipment and enlarged fire compartments.

Each tower is separated into several levels. For the Moscow Tower, the top four levels which served as residences are named from bottom to top: Beleveue, Sky, Star, and Galaxy. The same applies to St. Petersburg Tower, except it only has three levels rather than four. As a result, it does not have a level named Galaxy. Apartments cover floors 18-72 of Moscow Tower and floors 18-61 of the St. Petersburg Tower.

== Notable residents ==
- Former Syrian President Bashar al-Assad is said to own several apartments in this complex.

== Construction gallery ==
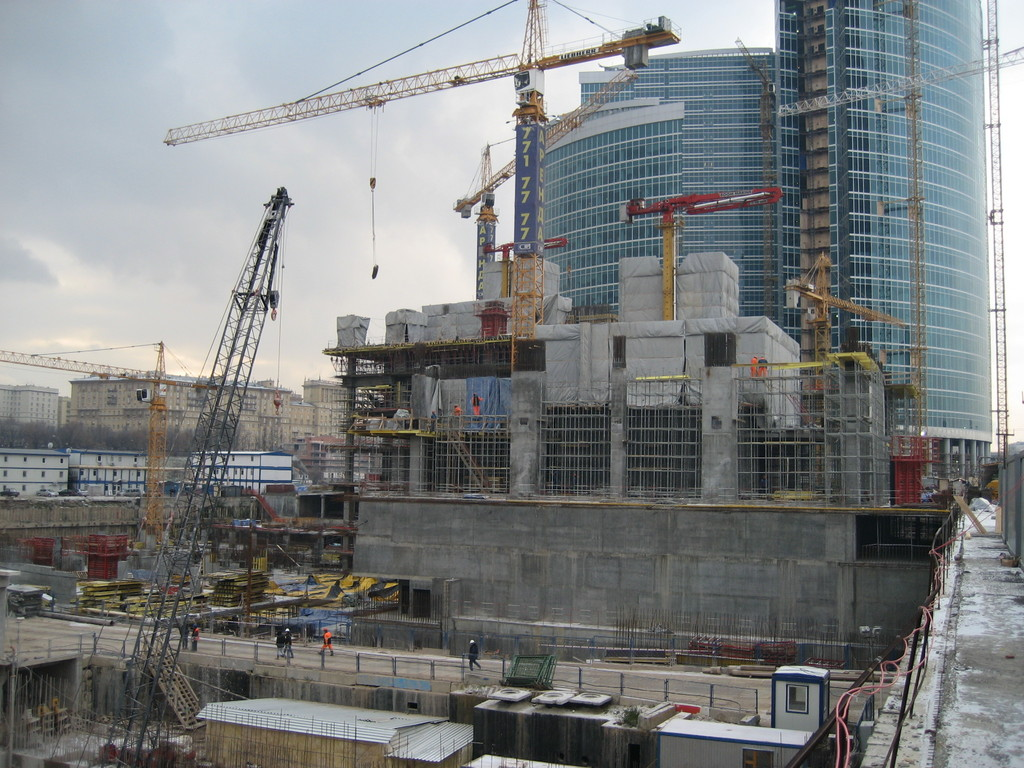
2005

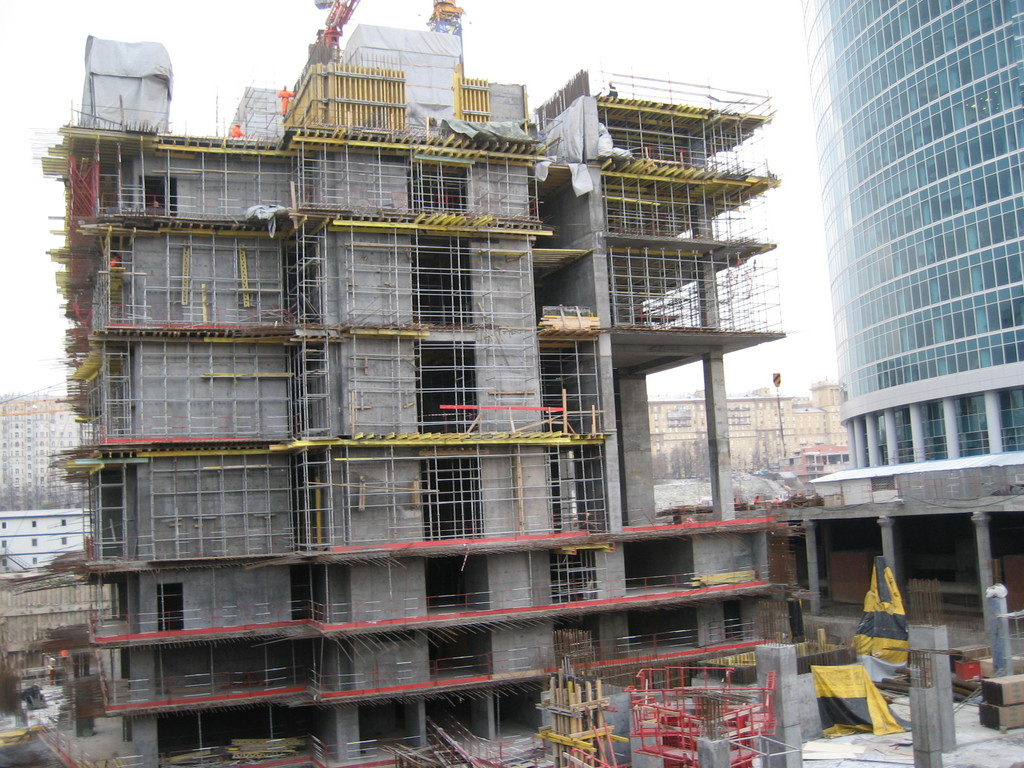
2006

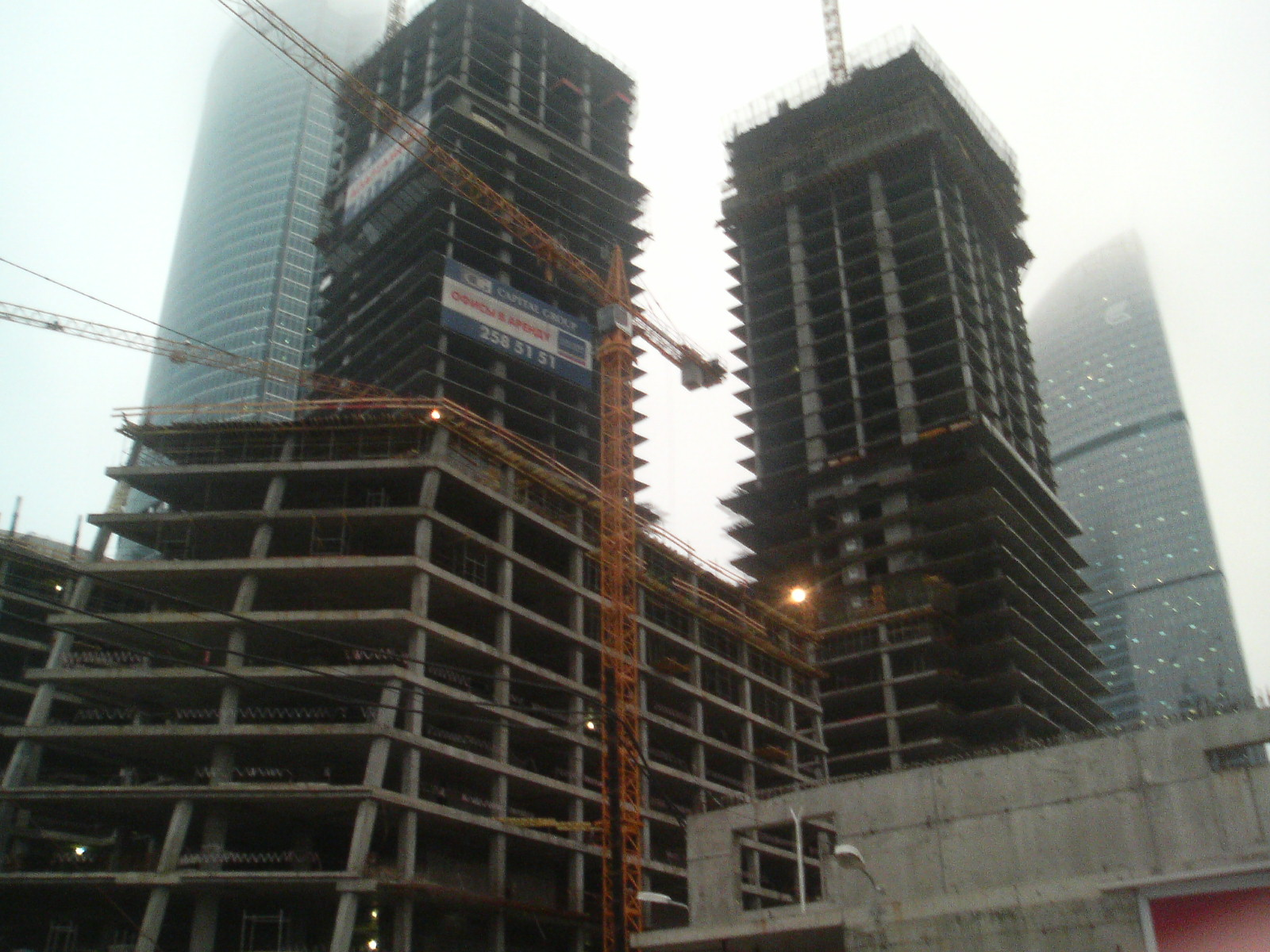
November 2006

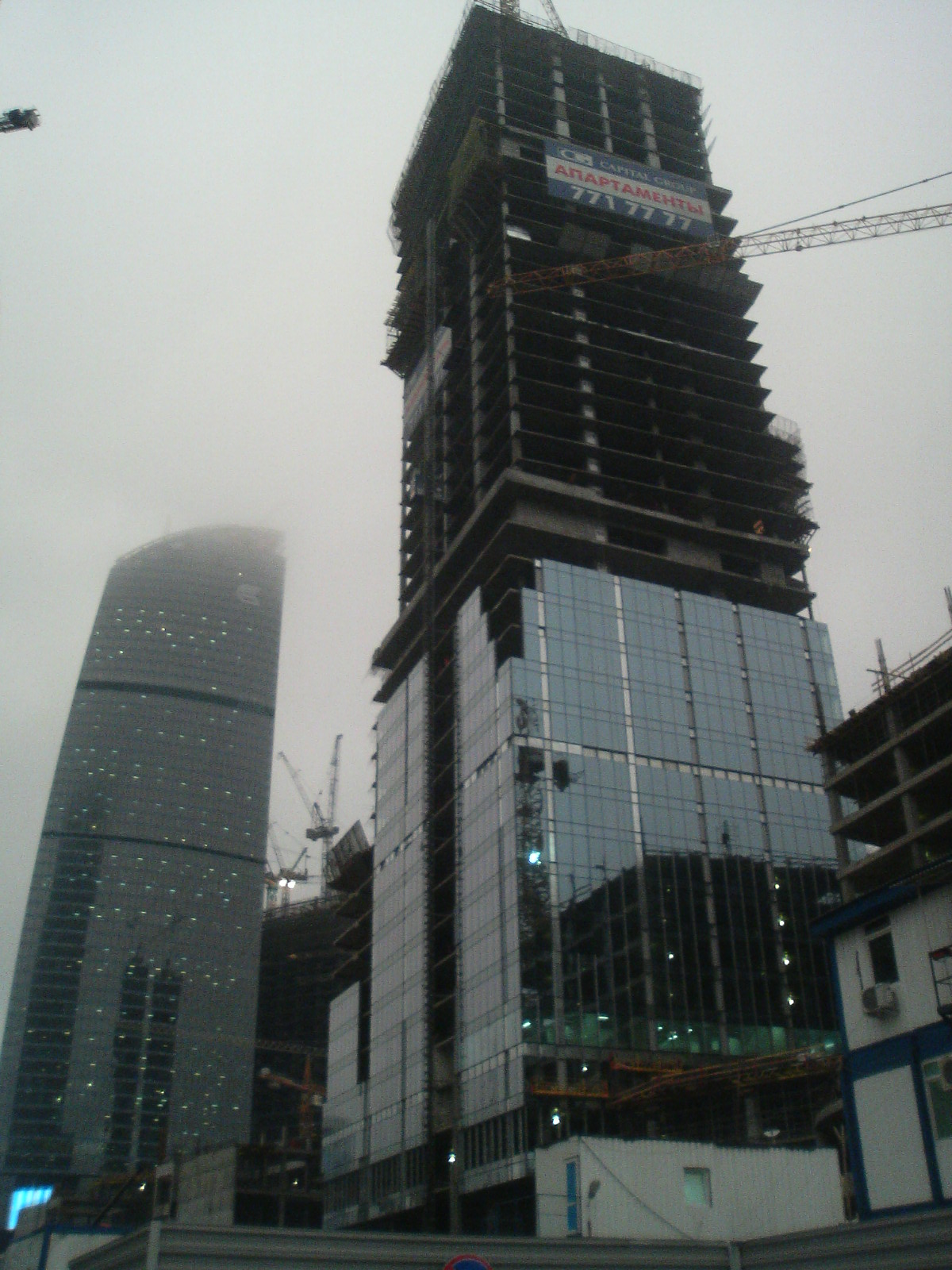
5 October 2007

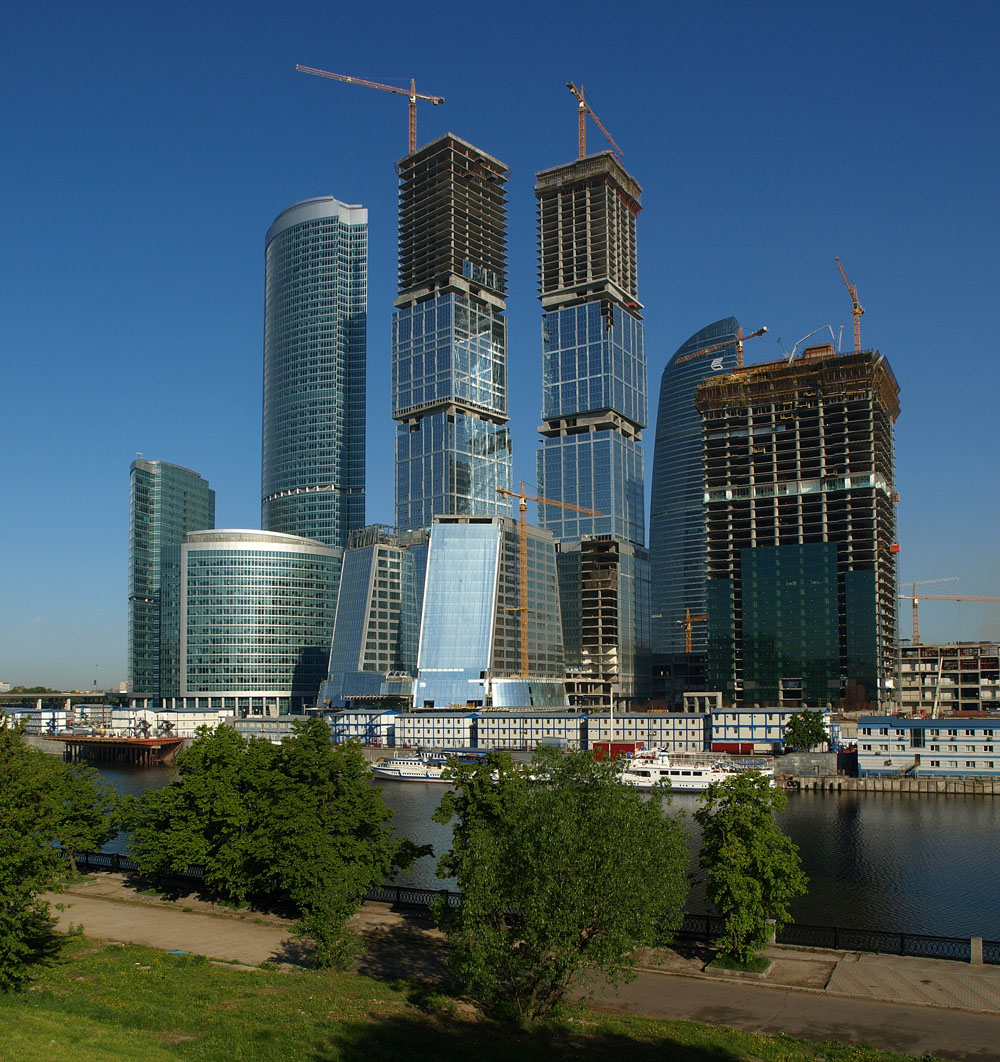
16 June 2008

== Awards ==
- In 2010, Moscow Tower was awarded by Emporis the Emporis Skyscraper Award for its aesthetic appearance and compatibility with the urban environment.

== See also ==
- List of tallest buildings in Moscow
- List of tallest buildings in Russia
- List of tallest buildings in Europe
- List of tallest structures in the former Soviet Union
- List of tallest residential buildings

Records
Preceded by Naberezhnaya Tower	Tallest Building in Europe; 2009—2012; 301.6 m	Succeeded by The Shard
Preceded by Naberezhnaya Tower	Tallest Building in the Former Soviet Union; 2009—2012; 301.6 m	Succeeded by Mercury City Tower
Preceded by Naberezhnaya Tower	Tallest Building in Russia; 2009—2012; 301.6 m	Succeeded by Mercury City Tower
Preceded by Naberezhnaya Tower	Tallest Building in Moscow; 2009—2012; 301.6 m	Succeeded by Mercury City Tower
