= Mercury City Tower =

Supertall skyscraper in Moscow, Russia

- Меркурий Cити Tауэр
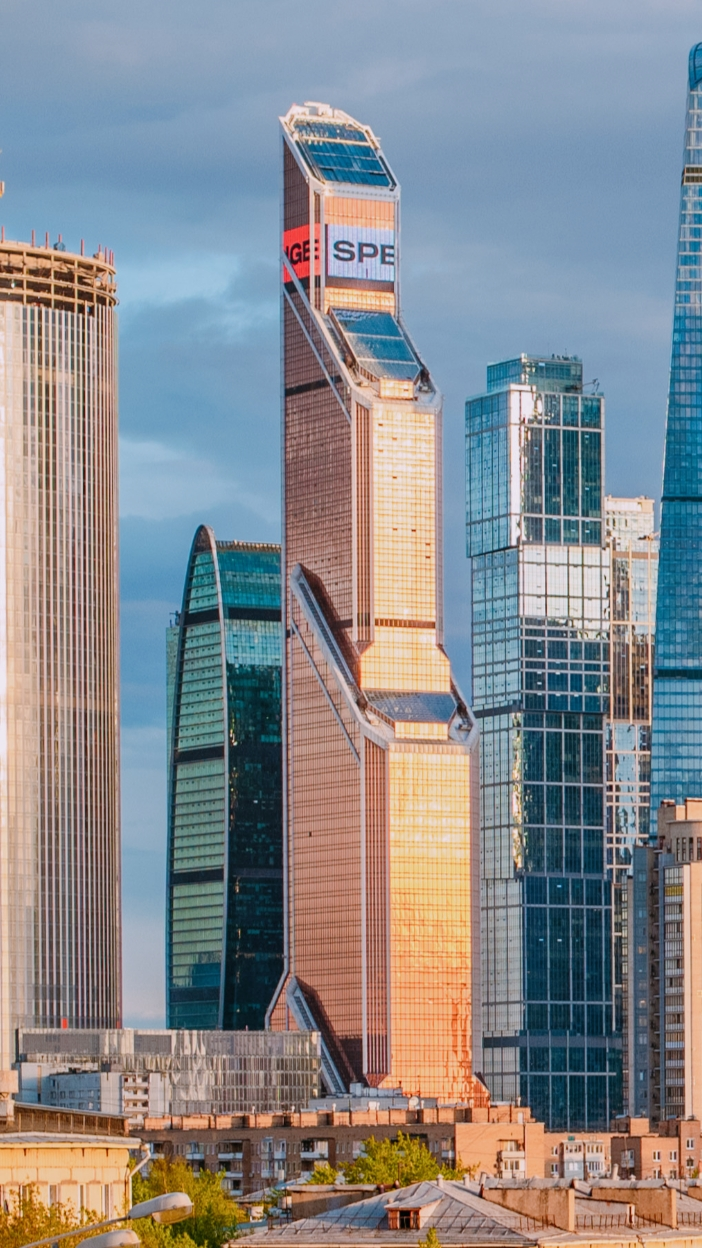
- Interactive map of the Mercury City Tower area
- Alternative names: Mercury City, Mercury Office Tower

General information
- Status: Completed
- Type: Mixed-use
- Architectural style: Structural Expressionism
- Location: Moscow International Business Center; Moscow, Russia
- Coordinates: 55°45′2″N 37°32′22″E
- Construction started: 2006
- Completed: 2013
- Cost: US$1 billion
- Owner: Igor Kesaev

Height
- Roof: 338.8 m (1,112 ft)

Technical details
- Floor count: 75; 5 below ground
- Floor area: 173,960 m^{2} (1,872,500 sq ft)
- Lifts/elevators: 29

Design and construction
- Architects: M.M. Posokhin; Frank Williams and Associates; G.L. Sirota
- Developer: LLC Rasen Stroy
- Structural engineer: Mosproject-2
- Main contractor: Rasen Construction

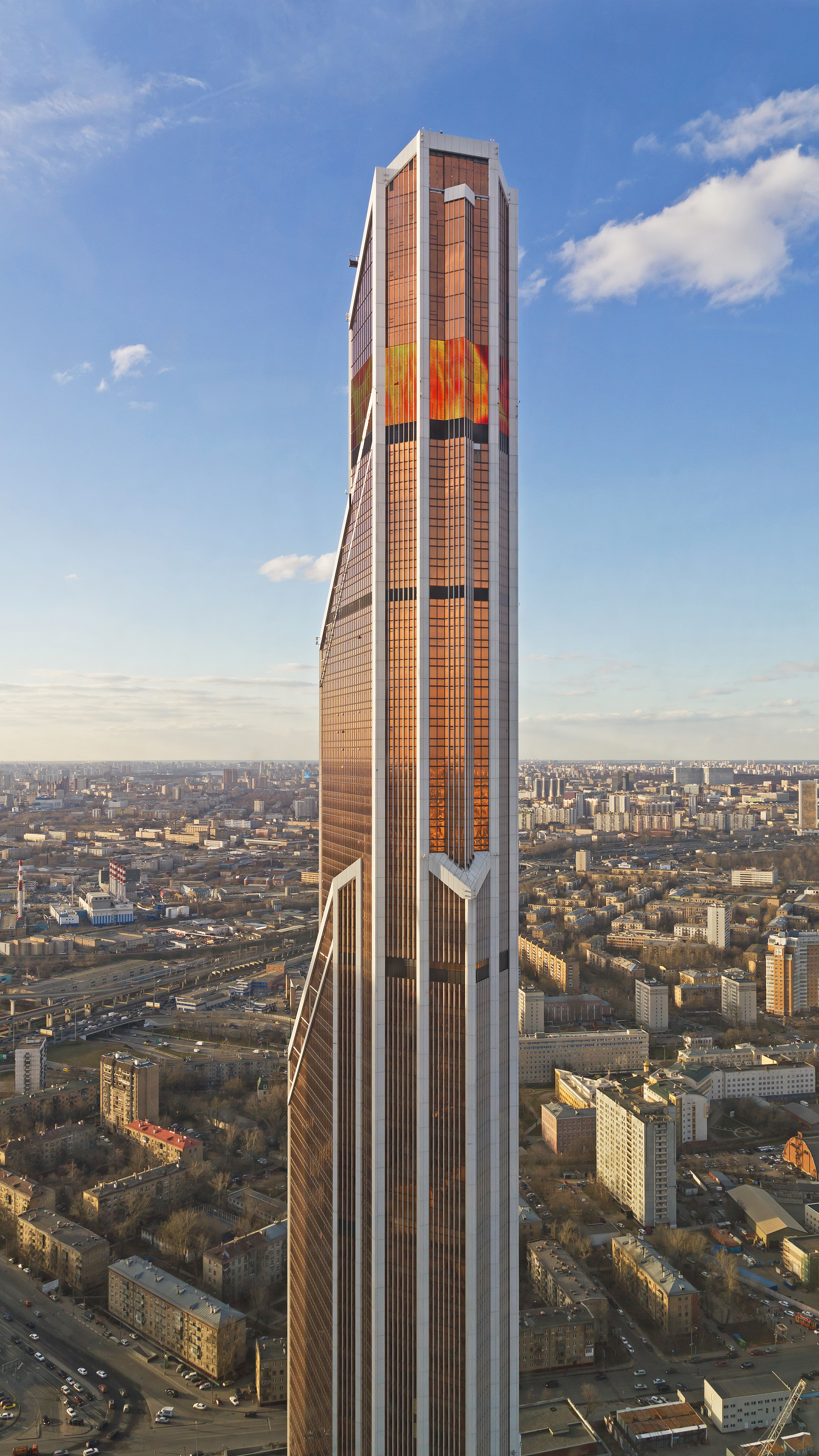
Mercury City Tower

Mercury City Tower (Russian: Меркурий Сити Тауэр, romanized: Merkuriy Siti Tauer) is a supertall skyscraper located on plot 14 in the Moscow International Business Center (MIBC), in Moscow, Russia. Occupying a total area of 173,960 square metres (1,872,500 ft^{2}), the mixed-use building houses offices, apartments, a fitness center, and retail stores.

Rising 338.8 m (1,112 ft) tall, the Mercury City Tower was formerly the tallest building of Russia and Europe, having surpassed the Moscow Tower of the neighboring City of Capitals complex (also in the MIBC) as the tallest of Russia and The Shard in London as Europe's tallest building. The Mercury City Tower kept this record from late 2012 to the summer of 2014, in which it was surpassed by the South Tower of the neighboring OKO complex (also on the MIBC) as the tallest building in Russia and Europe. Currently, it is the fifth-tallest building in Europe.

== History ==
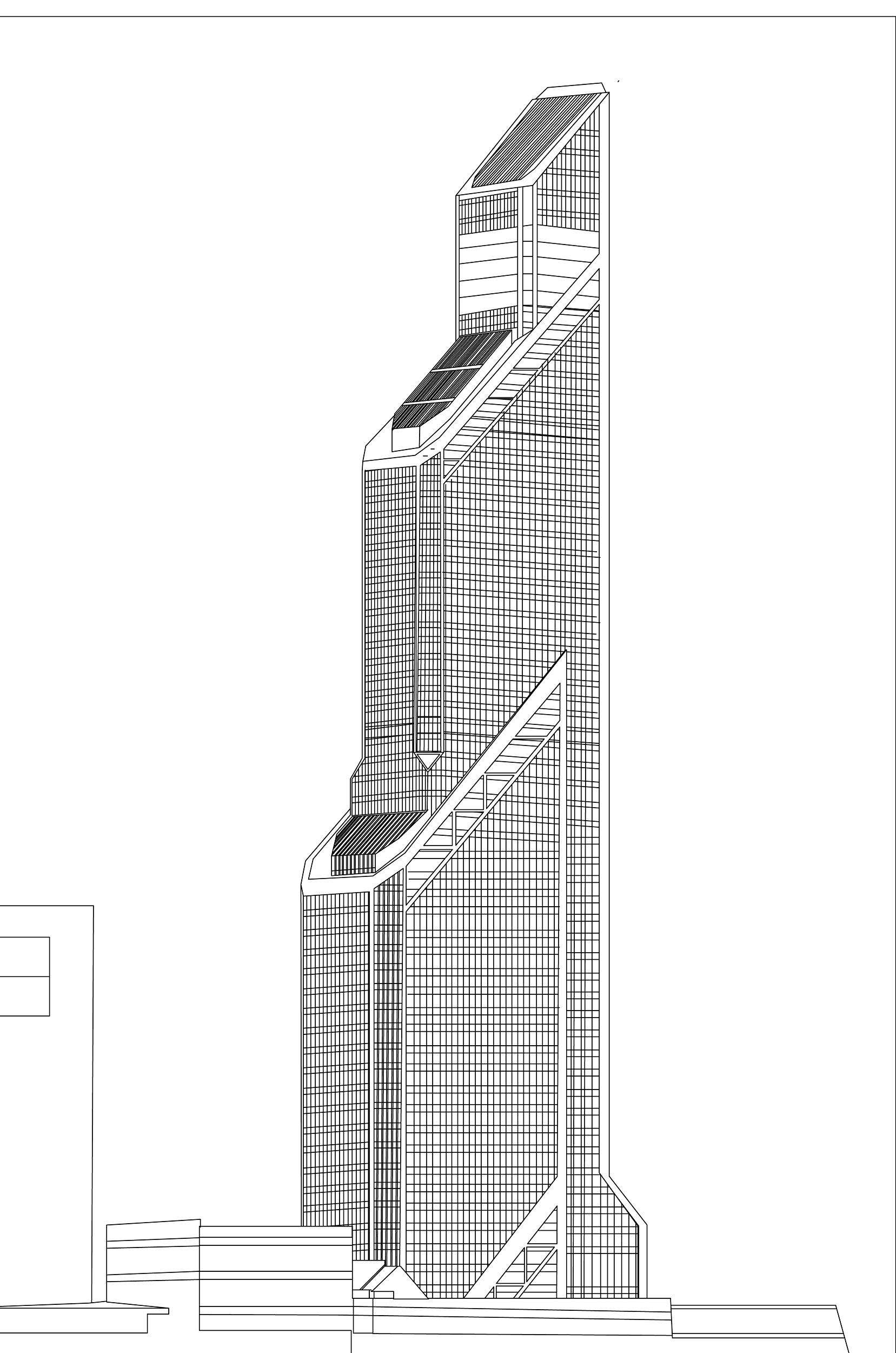
Wireframe version of the tower

Mercury City Tower was jointly developed by the American architect Frank Williams and the Russian engineering team Mosproject-2 under the leadership of architect Mikhail Posokhin. After the death of Williams in 2010, the Russians were able to convince Dutch architect Erick van Egeraat to succeed him and thus finish Williams' work.

Construction of Mercury City Tower began in 2006. The project was estimated to be completed by 2009, but developers Mercury Development and Liedel Investments Limited preferred to slow down the project in order to not bring the building to the housing market during the Great Recession. By 21 April 2009, Mercury City Tower had just finished foundation work: finishing earthworks and five underground floors, and was ready for construction over ground. The estimated completion date was then pushed to 2010.

On 1 November 2012, the Mercury City Tower topped out at 338.8 m (1,112 ft), overtaking the Moscow Tower of the neighboring City of Capitals complex as the tallest building of Russia and The Shard in London as tallest building of Europe. It also became the world's tallest building built of reinforced concrete.

Construction was finished in 2013.

On the summer of 2014, the South Tower of the neighboring OKO complex surpassed the Mercury City Tower as the tallest building in Russia and Europe as well as the tallest building built of reinforced concrete.

Construction was conducted with the help of a US$300 million loan from Sberbank, which created the ground for speculation about the possible transition of the building into ownership of the bank in 2015–2016. The loan was restructured in 2016. The whole cost of the project was estimated by business publications to range between US$650 million and US$1 billion.

In May 2021 this building, alongside the Chinese and Russian diplomatic facilities in Australia, were the targets of a bomb threat posted on Dutch sports site Sportnieuws.nl that was hacked by persons calling themselves 'Encore Ong' and 'Zehang T'.

== Design ==
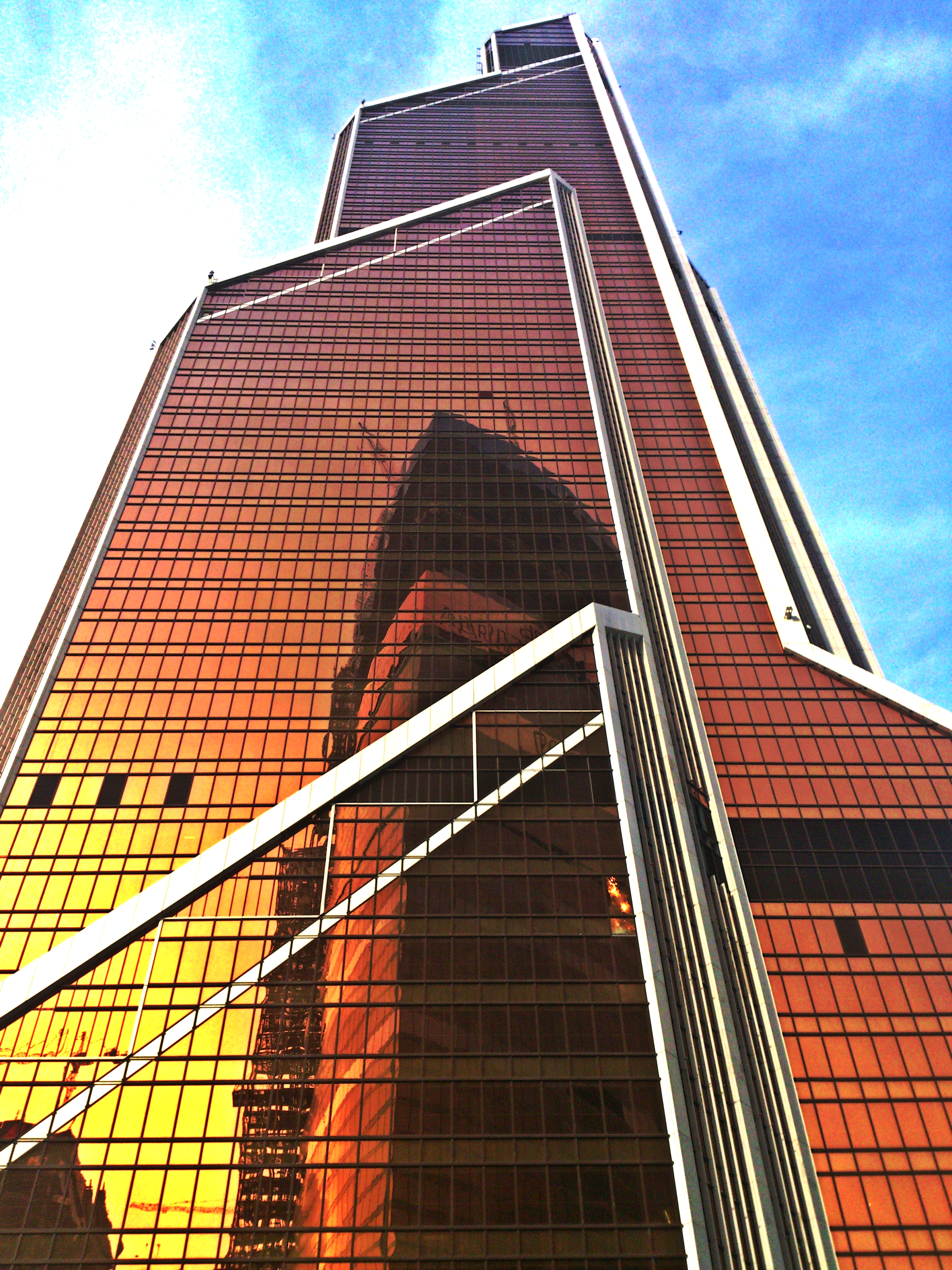
Mercury City Tower from the ground

=== Overview ===
The Mercury City Tower's distinctive copper-colored cladding makes the building stand out among its neighboring skyscrapers in the MIBC as well as the entirety of Moscow. The building was originally designed to be surfaced in reflective silver glass in order to mirror the buildings surrounding it, but this eventually was replaced by an equally reflective bronze-tinted glass. This gives the building a constant orange glow that makes it appear as it is embracing itself with the sunlight on the horizon. This was according to Egeraat in an interview with Arch.ru introduced by Egeraat's Russian colleagues. A media facade of two million LEDs was installed on the exterior of the 67th and 68th floors of the building, the tallest media facade in Europe.

The Mercury City Tower also has a unique setback shape, in which the building steps back twice along its northwestern facade, creating a tapering effect that extends the building's height in conjunction with the vertical skeletal striping that show its corners. Each setback has a slanted roof that supports the illusion of added height. For greater reliability, two independent reinforced concrete skeletons were provided to make the Mercury City Tower resistant against a 6.0 magnitude earthquake. This as a result gives the building a futuristic and high-tech look, fitting it in the Structural Expressionist architectural style.

After Williams' death on 25 February 2010, his successor Egeraat stated it would be improper to make significant changes to the tower and focused on improving the upper levels of the building, elaborating a functional solution for the skyscraper, and developing interiors of public spaces.

=== Environmental ===
The building is claimed by architect Frank Williams as the first environmentally friendly building in Russia, since it was designed to collect melting snow water, as well as provide 70% of the workplaces with access to daylight. The building also features a smart "energy cycle" system that regulates energy usage, ambient temperatures, and hot water distribution throughout the development.

=== Features ===
Mercury City Tower is a mixed-use building, featuring offices, apartments, retail, restaurants, a fitness center, conference rooms, and parking spaces. The apartments are located on the topmost floors of the building, and was designed to merge units, adding to the tower's overall space efficiency.

The building has a total of 29 elevators, in which two of them are high-speed elevators travelling at a maximum speed of 7 m/s. Out of the 29 elevators, 20 are passenger elevators and 9 are service elevators. 10 of the passenger elevators operate with the TWIN system.

== Construction gallery ==
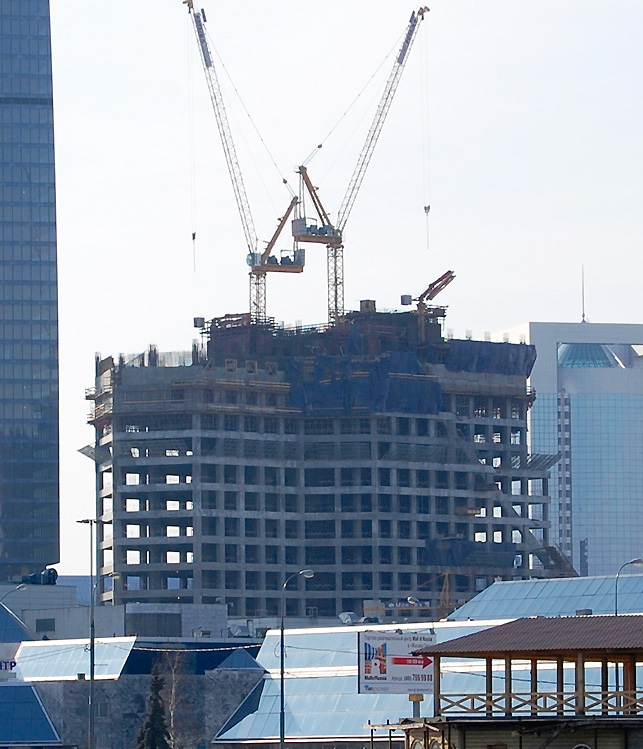
March 2010

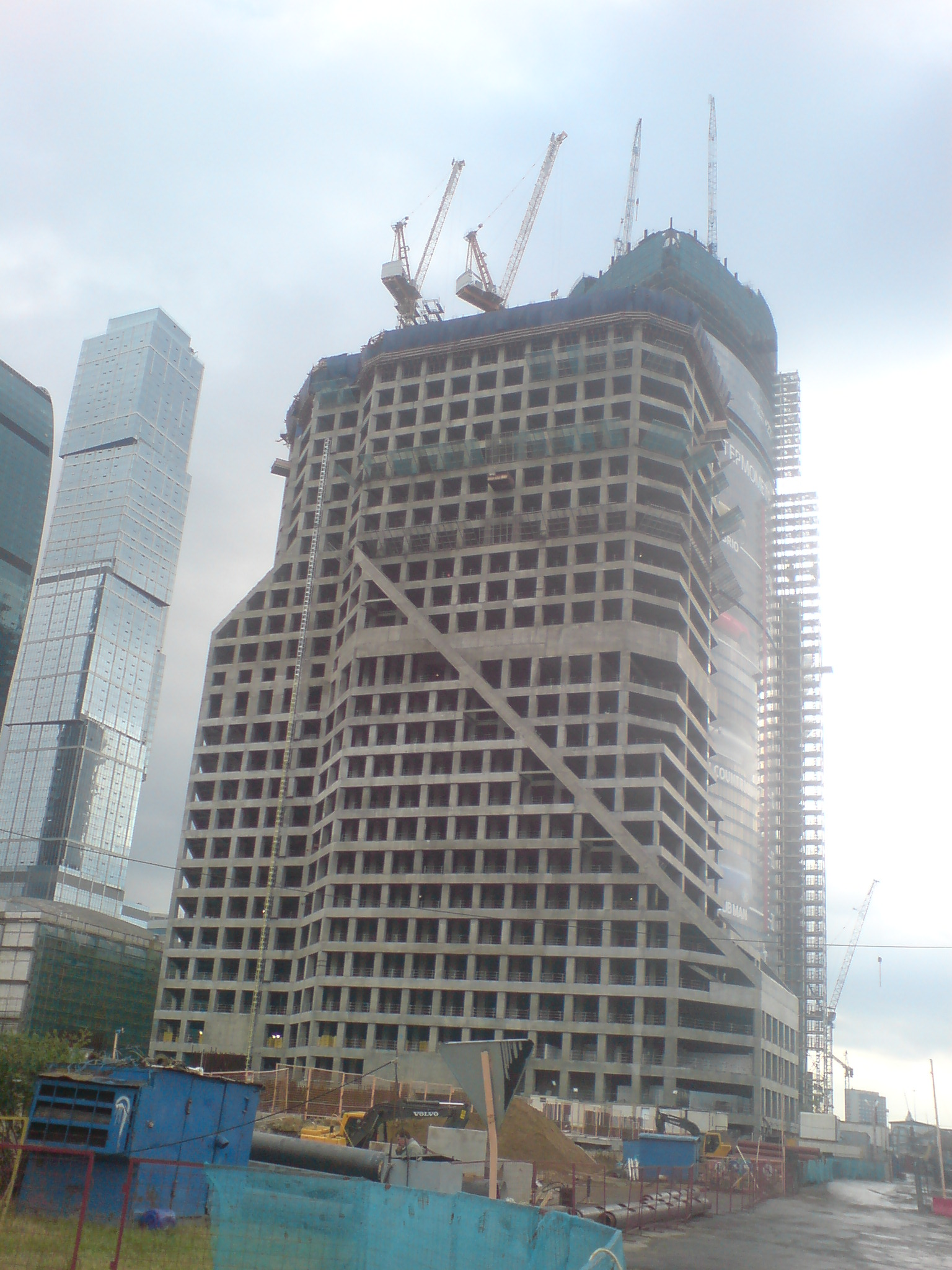
August 2010

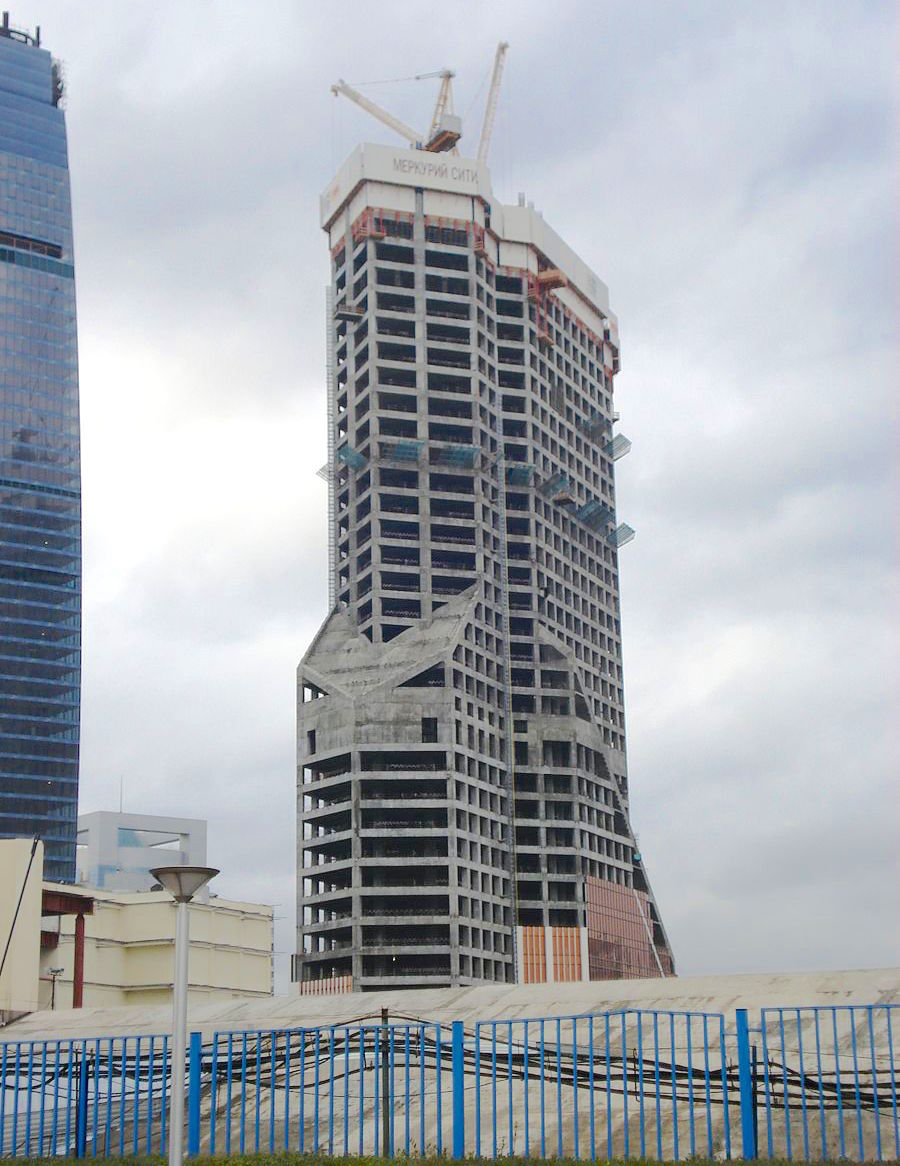
November 2010

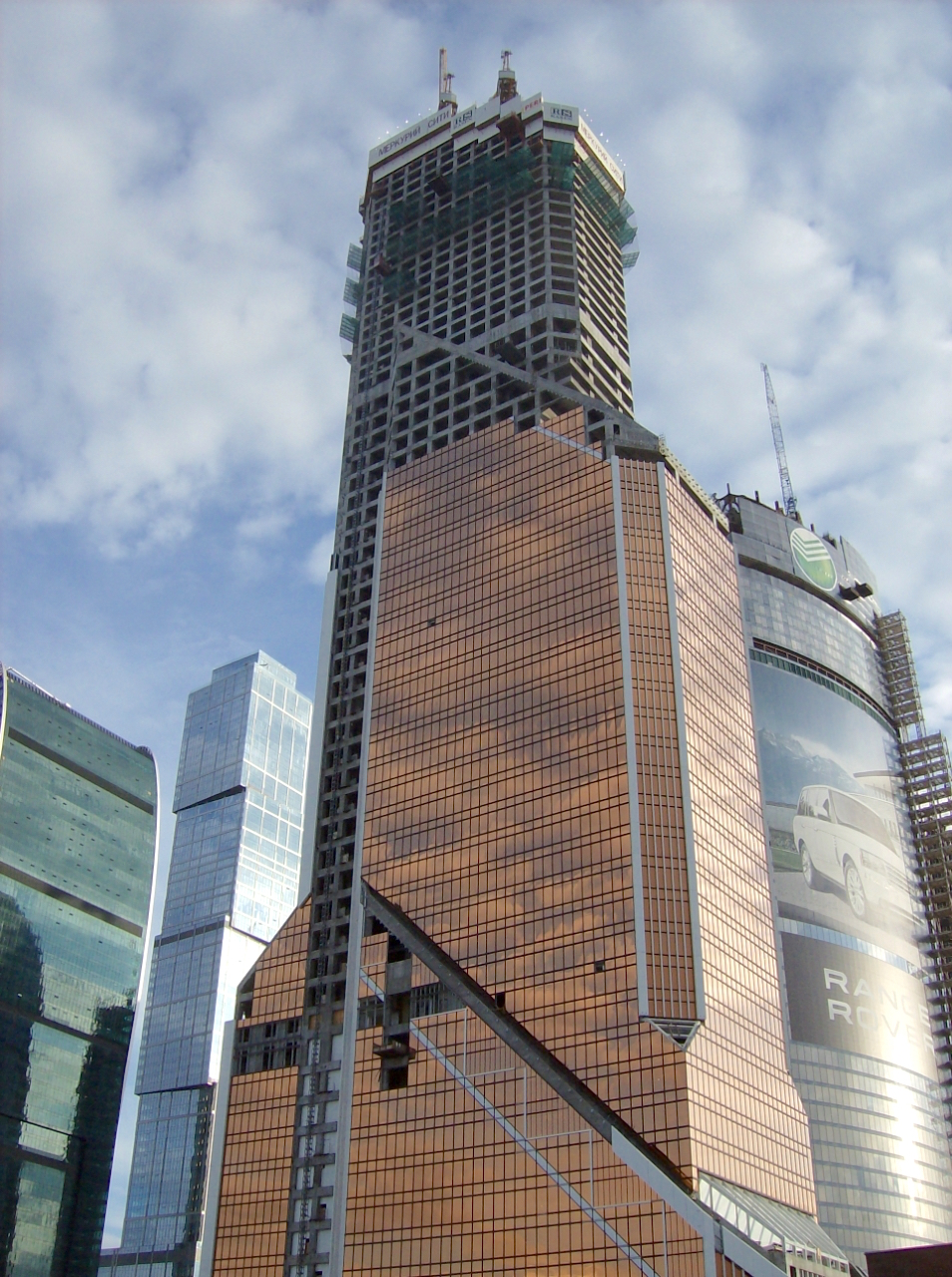
August 2011

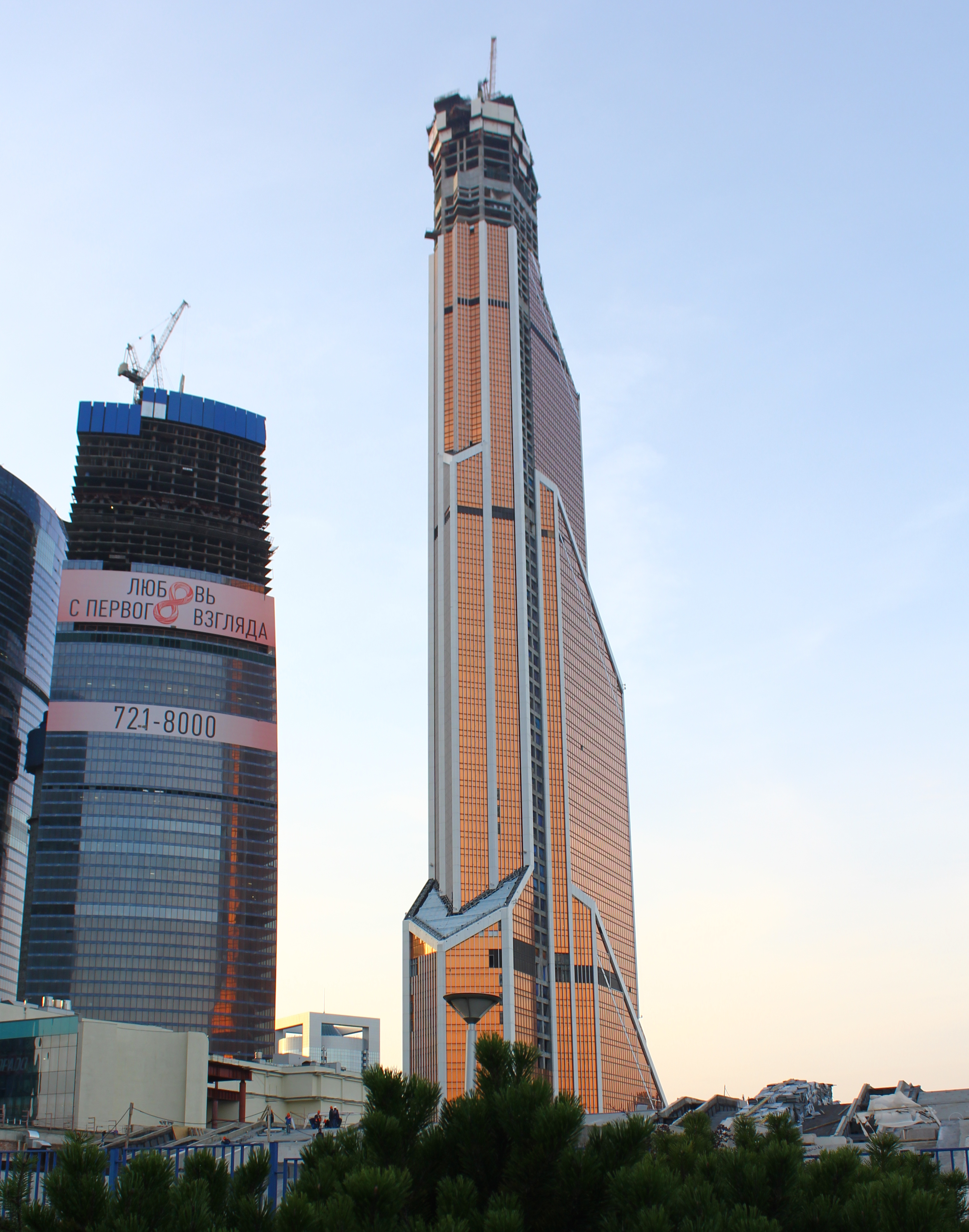
October 2012

== Awards ==
- Mercury City Tower earned 7th place of the Emporis Skyscraper Award Year 2013.

Records
Preceded by The Shard	Tallest Building in Europe; 2012—2014; 338.8 m	Succeeded by OKO South Tower
Preceded by City of Capitals Moscow Tower	Tallest Building in the Former Soviet Union; 2012—2014; 338.8 m	Succeeded by OKO South Tower
Preceded by City of Capitals Moscow Tower	Tallest Building in Russia; 2012—2014; 338.8 m	Succeeded by OKO South Tower
Preceded by City of Capitals Moscow Tower	Tallest Building in Moscow; 2012—2014; 338.8 m	Succeeded by OKO South Tower
