= Capital Towers (Moscow) =

Residential skyscrapers in Moscow

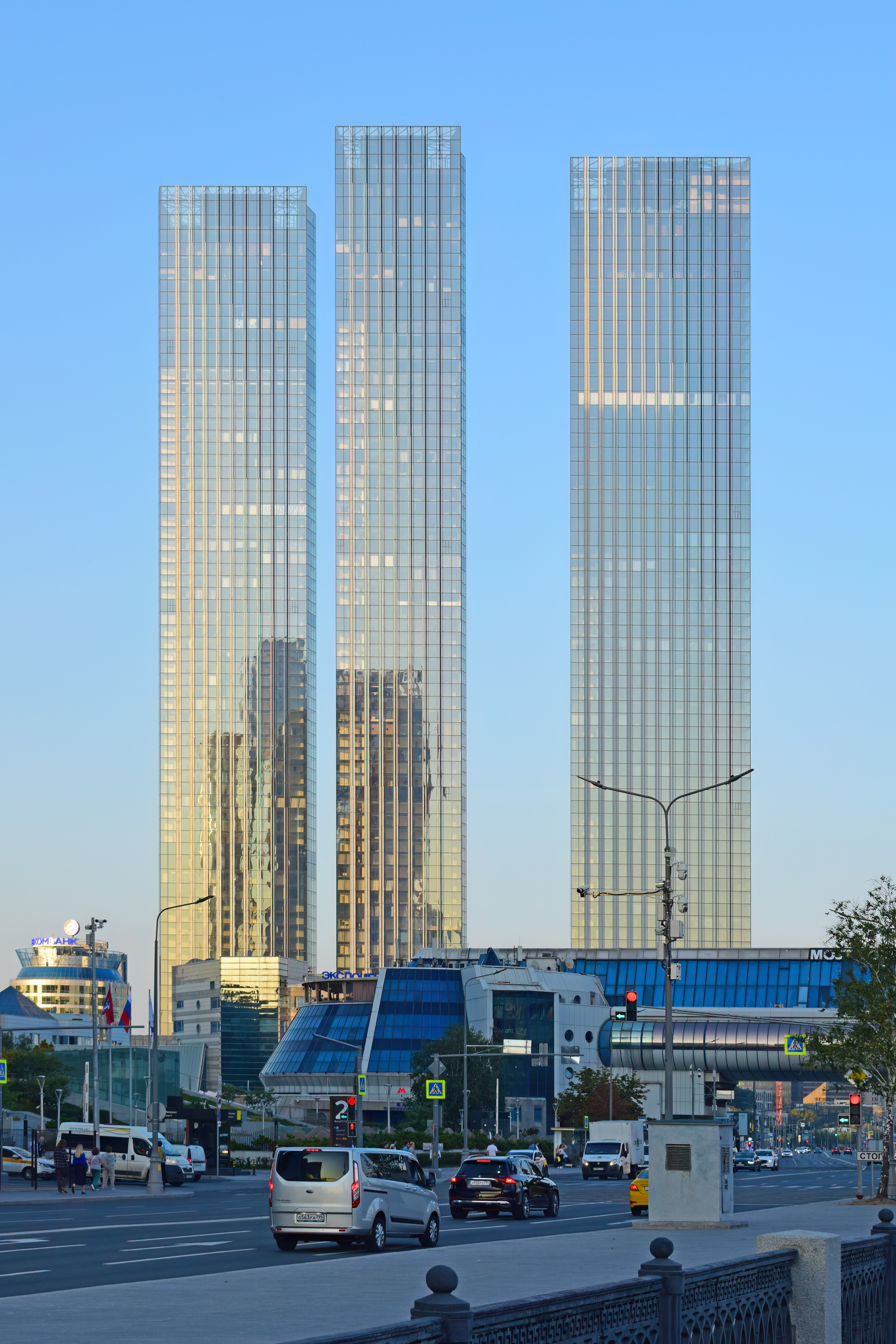
- Park Tower, City Tower and River Tower
- Interactive map of the Capital Towers area

General information
- Status: Completed
- Location: Moscow, Russia
- Coordinates: 55°45′5.360″N 37°32′54.910″E
- Construction started: 2017
- Opened: 2023
- Owner: Capital Group

Height
- Height: 295 metres (968 ft)

Technical details
- Floor count: 61
- Lifts/elevators: 10

Design and construction
- Architect: Sergey Skuratov Architects
- Developer: Capital Group

Website
- capitaltowers.ru

Capital Towers is a complex of three residential skyscrapers in Moscow, Russia. The towers are located near the Moscow International Business Center on a Moskva River bank. The three skyscrapers are named Park Tower, City Tower and River Tower. The construction started in 2017 and ended in 2023. Having been completed, at a height of 295 metres (968 ft) each, the Capital Towers are among the tallest buildings in Moscow and in Europe.
