= Neva Towers =

Coordinates: 55°45′05″N 37°32′04″E

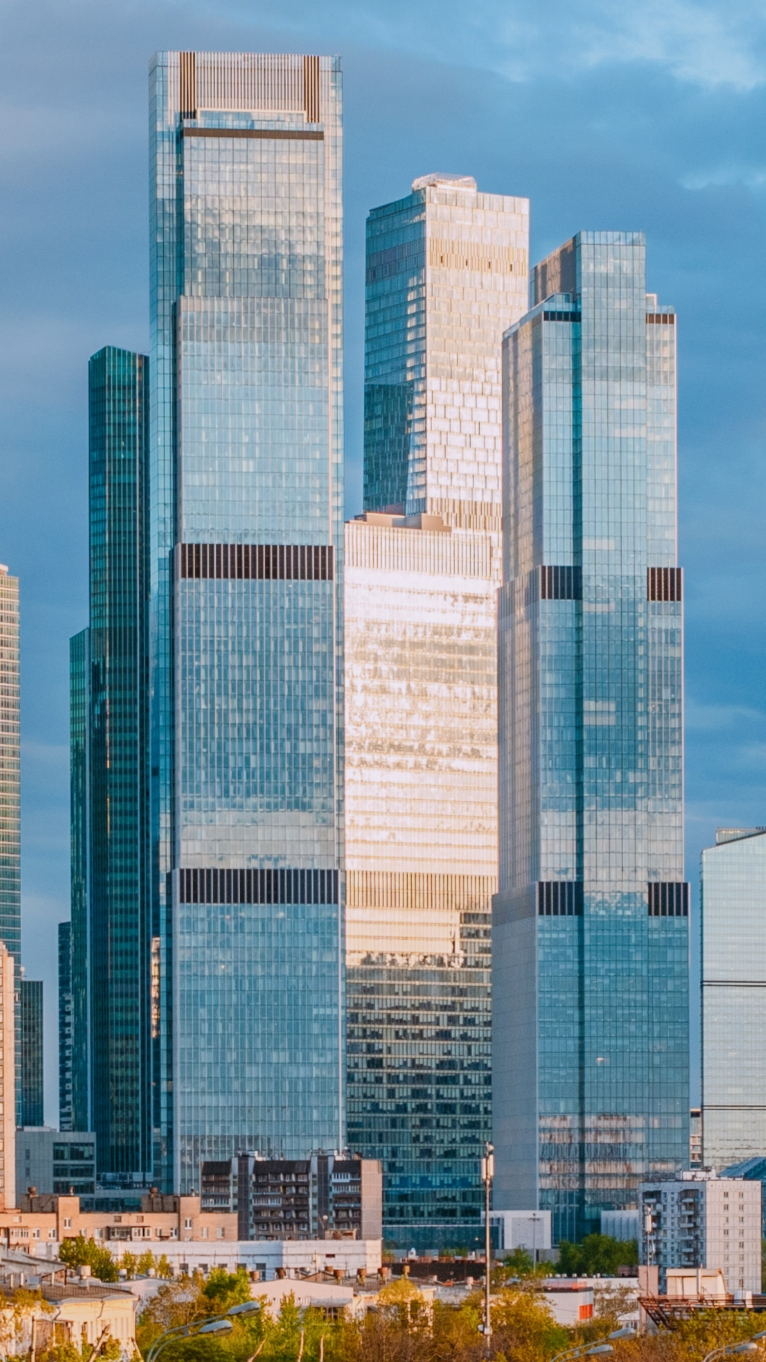
- Neva Towers in Moscow
- Interactive map of the Neva Towers area
- Former names: Renaissance Moscow Towers

General information
- Status: Completed
- Location: Moscow-City, Moscow, Russia
- Construction started: August 21, 2013
- Completed: 2020
- Cost: US$ 1 billion

Height
- Top floor: 302 m (991 ft) (Tower 1); 345 m (1,132 ft) (Tower 2)

Technical details
- Floor count: 65 (Tower 1); 79 (Tower 2)
- Floor area: 349,232 m^{2} (3,759,100 sq ft)

Design and construction
- Developer: ST Towers
- Main contractor: Rönesans Holding

The Neva Towers, formerly the Renaissance Moscow Towers, is a complex of two skyscrapers located on plots 17 and 18 of the Moscow International Business Center (MIBC) in Moscow, Russia. Tower 1, at 302 metres (991 feet) tall with 65 floors, is the ninth-tallest building in Europe. Tower 2, at 345 metres (1,132 feet) tall with 79 floors, is the tallest residential building in Europe and the sixth-tallest building in Europe. The complex was completed in 2020.

== History ==
=== Origins ===
Plots 17 and 18 of the MIBC were to be used originally for the Russia Tower, a supertall skyscraper designed by Norman Foster, but the Great Recession and issues with investors forced development of the project to be cancelled. In 2014, ownership of half of the plot was transferred to Turkish company Rönesans Holding.

As general contractor, Rönesans Holding hired ST Towers LLC to develop a new complex, the Renaissance Moscow Towers, later renamed the Neva Towers. The project would also be developed by the SPEECH Architectural Bureau, in partnership with American companies HOK and FXCollaborative, with public spaces designed by Hirsch Bedner Associates. The management of the complex claimed to receive a LEED Gold certificate.

=== Construction ===
Sales of the apartments in the complex opened in September 2016. Investments for the complex exceeded $1 billion later in November 2016.

On 15 October 2018, Tower 2 of the Neva Towers was architecturally topped out when work on the 79th floor was completed. Construction of the first stage of the project was 70% completed.

== Design ==
The plots Neva Towers are built on have a total area of 2.41 hectares. The total area of the complex is 349.2 thousand square metres. The complex is composed of a single four-storey stylobate where the two towers are built on top. Tower 2 is a 79-storey residential skyscraper with a height of 345 metres. Tower 1 is a 69-storey skyscraper with a height of 302 metres with office space on the 28th floor. Within the complex is a private park with an area of seven thousand square metres. In addition, the complex has a hotel and fitness centre with a swimming pool located in Tower 2. There is also a parking lot with a capacity of 2,040 cars for workers and residents of the complex. Stone plates of light stone were used to decorate the skyscrapers.

== Gallery ==
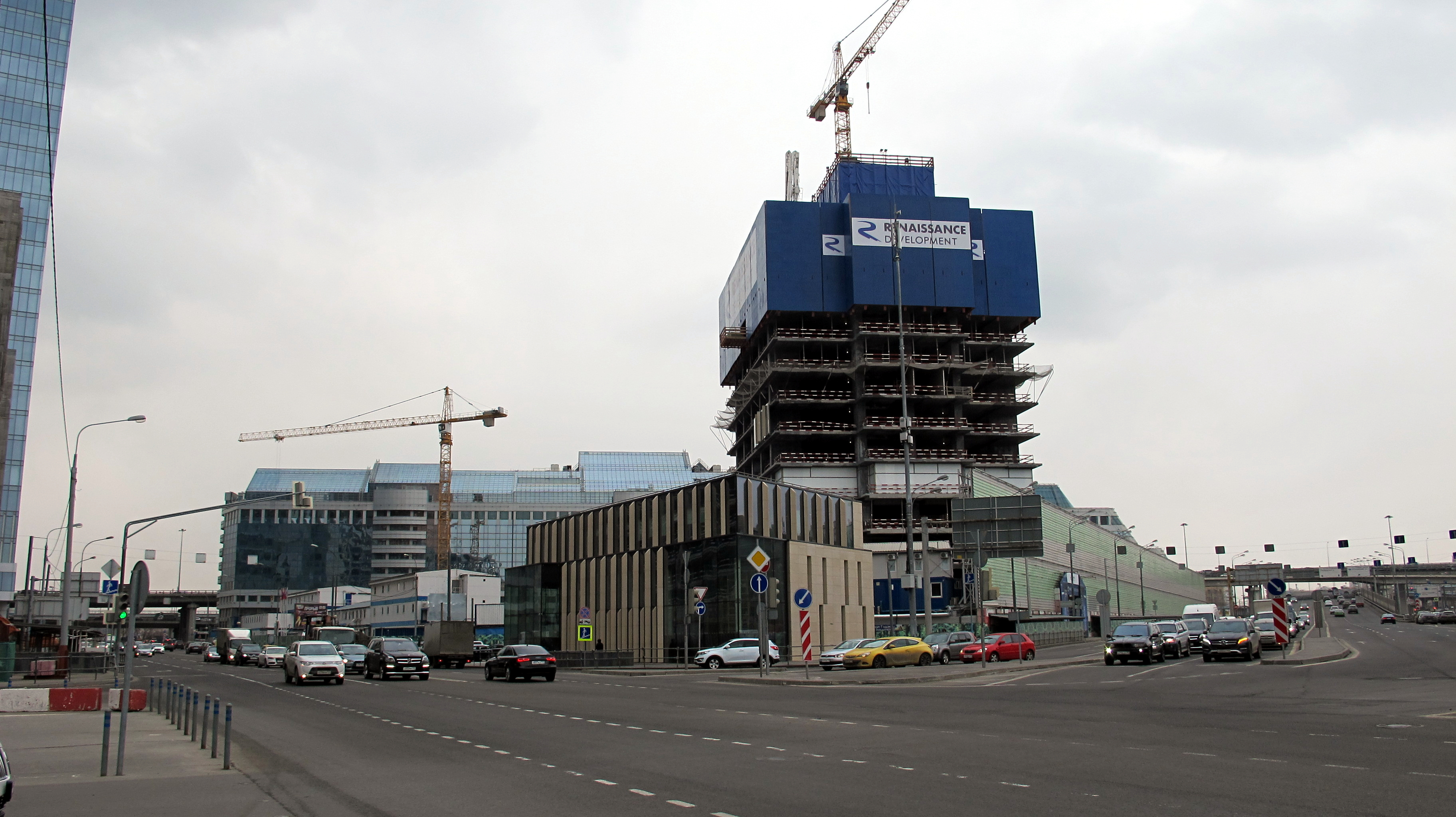
March 22, 2016

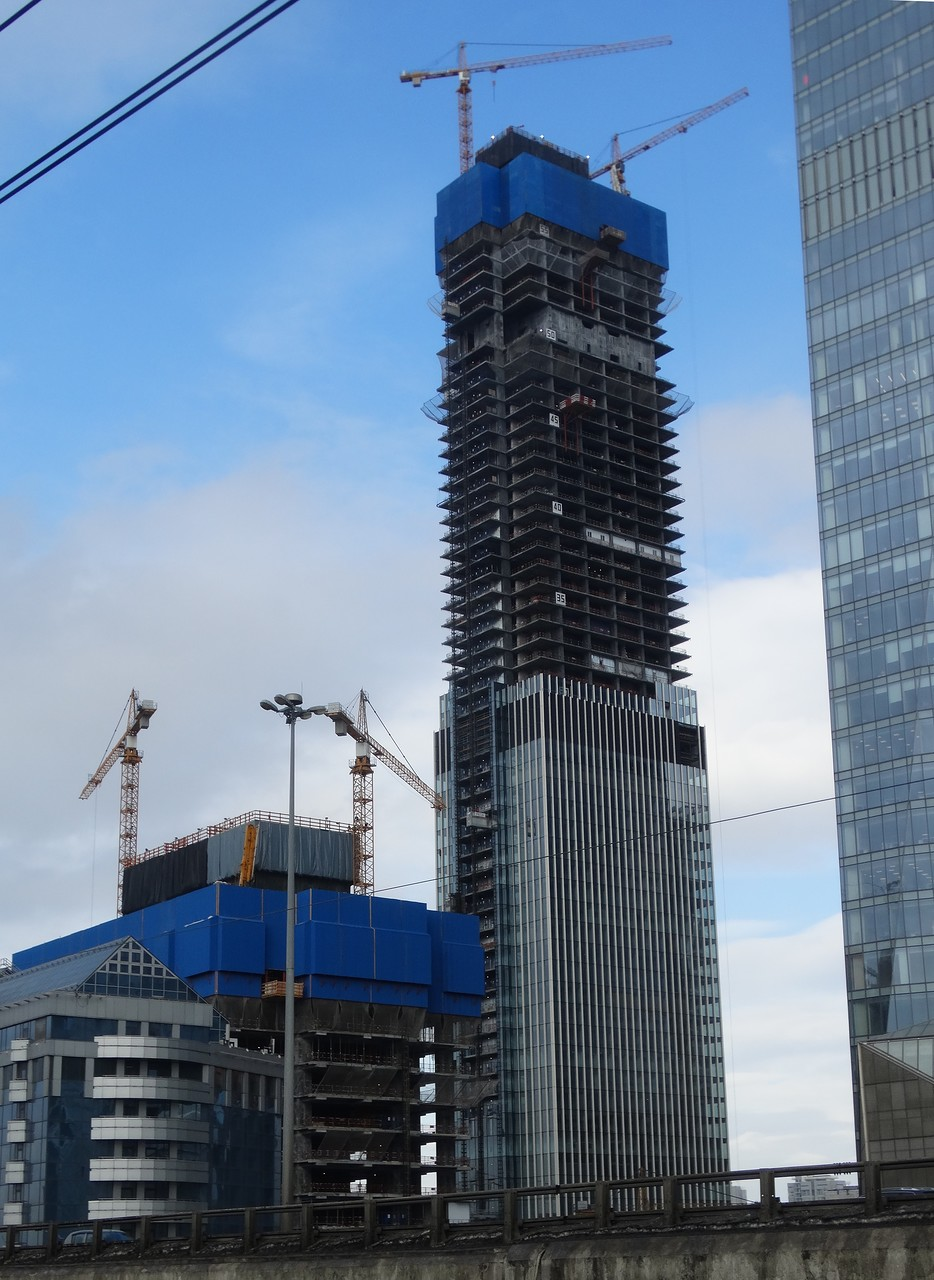
March 11, 2018

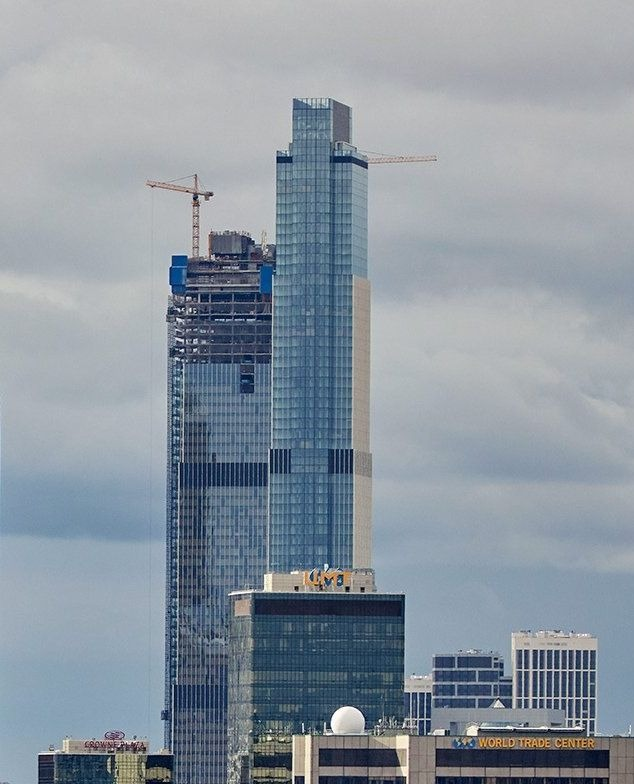
January 28, 2020

== See also ==
- List of tallest buildings in Moscow
- List of tallest buildings in Russia
- List of tallest residential buildings
