= List of tallest buildings in Russia =

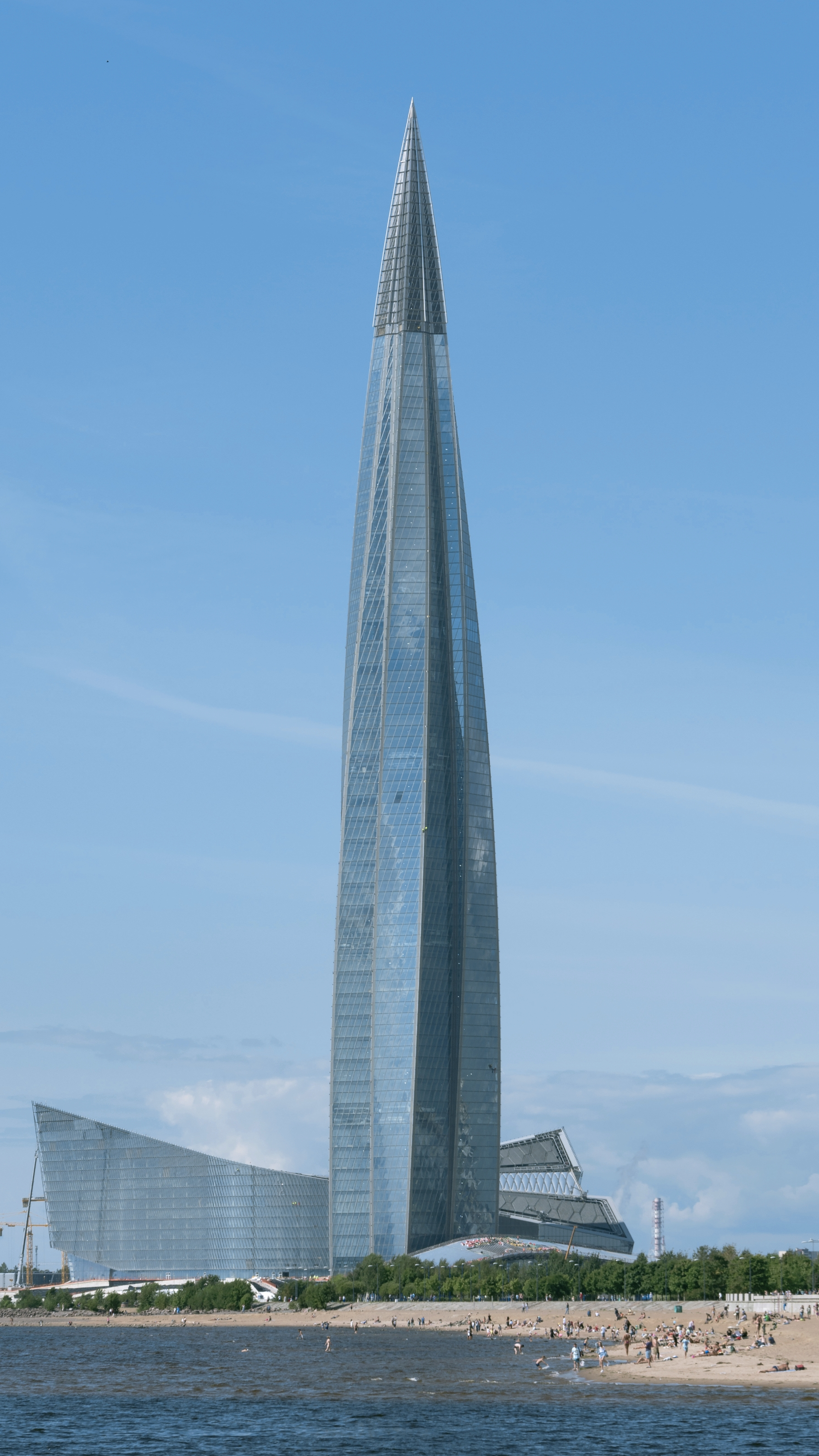
Lakhta Center in Saint Petersburg is the tallest building in Russia.

The first skyscrapers in Russia were built during the Stalinist Era in the Soviet Union. These skyscrapers are known as the Seven Sisters, which were built in the Stalinist architectural style. The first skyscraper to be constructed in Russia was the Kotelnicheskaya Embankment Building. Skyscrapers in Russia are among the tallest in Europe and the Eastern Hemisphere, the vast majority of them are located in the MIBC, in the nation's capital of Moscow, which is home to 7 out of the 10 tallest skyscrapers in Europe.

As of 2022, the Lakhta Center in Saint Petersburg is the tallest skyscraper in Russia and Europe, with a height of 462 metres (1,516 ft). It is followed by four skyscrapers in the MIBC, Federation Tower Vostok (or "East"), OKO, Neva Tower 2, and Mercury City Tower, the tallest buildings in both Russia and Europe.

Russia is currently going through a skyscraper construction boom; with multiple skyscrapers under construction and planned. It is the first European nation with over roughly 300 skyscrapers completed over 100 metres.

The list does not include Ostankino Tower (540 m), the tallest free-standing structure in Russia and Europe. For this kind of buildings, see List of tallest structures built in the Soviet Union.

== Tallest buildings ==
This list ranks all topped out buildings in Russia that stand at least 150 metres (490 ft) tall, based on standard height measurement. This includes all architectural details as well as antenna spires.

An asterisk (*) indicates that a building has been topped out, but not completed.

: Was Europe's tallest building upon completion
: Was Europe's tallest structures upon completion
Indicates was the tallest buildings that have been architecturally topped out but not completed

Rank	Name	Image	Height m (ft)	Floors	Year	Notes	Location	Ref.
N/A	Ostankino Tower		540.1 (1,772)	120 equiv.	1967	Tallest free-standing structure in Europe. Between 1967 and 1974, it was the tallest free-standing structure in the world. The tower was the first free-standing structure to exceed 500 m (1,600 ft) in height.	Moscow	
1	Lakhta Center		462 (1,516)	87	2019	Reached its design height in 2017, topped out in 2018, and was completed in 2019. Upon completion, it became the tallest building in Russia and Europe, surpassing the East Tower of the Federation Tower.	Saint Petersburg 59°59′13.7″N 30°10′37.3″E	
2	Federation, East Tower		373.7 (1,226)	97	2017	Also known as Vostok (Russian for 'East'). Tallest building in Europe from 2016 to 2017, when it was surpassed by Lakhta Center in Saint Petersburg. 14 thousand cubic meters of concrete were used for its pouring, an achievement recorded in the Guinness Book of Records. Designed by Sergei Tchoban.	Moscow 55°44′59″N 37°32′16″E	
3	OKO, South Tower		354.2 (1,162)	85	2015	Tallest building in Europe from 2015 to 2016, when it was surpassed by the neighboring Federation Tower. Designed by Skidmore, Owings and Merrill.	Moscow 55°44′57″N 37°32′2″E	
4	Neva Towers, Tower 2		345 (1,132)	79	2019	Upon completion, it became the tallest residential building in Europe. Designed by SPEECH architectural office in partnership with HOK and FXCollaborative, with public spaces designed by Hirsch Bedner Associates.	Moscow 55°45′05″N 37°32′06″E	
5	Mercury City Tower		338.8 (1,112)	75	2013	Tallest building in Europe from 2013 to 2014, when it was surpassed by OKO, South Tower. Designed by Frank Williams.	Moscow 55°45′2″N 37°32′23″E	
6	Eurasia		308.9 (1,013)	70	2014	Also known as Steel Peak. Designed by Swanke Hayden Connell Architects.	Moscow 55°44′56″N 37°32′07″E	
7	City of Capitals, Moscow Tower		301.8 (990)	76	2010	Tallest building in Europe from 2010 to 2011. First "supertall" in Moscow and Europe. Tallest residential building in Europe from 2010 to 2011. Surpassed by The Shard in London, United Kingdom. Designed by NBBJ and Erick van Egeraat.	Moscow 55°44′49″N 37°32′20″E	
8	Neva Towers, Tower 1		297 (974)	65	2020	Design by SPEECH architectural office with in partnership with American companies HOK and FXCollaborative, with public spaces designed by Hirsch Bedner Associates.	Moscow 55°45′04″N 37°32′01″E	
9 =	Capital Towers, River Tower		295 (968)	70	2023	The original height of the towers was planned to be 267 meters, but was increased to 295 meters. Designed by Sergey Skuratov.	Moscow 55°45′4″N 37°32′59″E	
9 =	Capital Towers, City Tower		295 (968)	67	2023	The original height of the towers was planned to be 267 meters, but was increased to 295 meters. Designed by Sergey Skuratov.	Moscow 55°45′5″N 37°32′55″E	
9 =	Capital Towers, Park Tower		295 (968)	67	2023	The original height of the towers was planned to be 267 meters, but was increased to 295 meters. Designed by Sergey Skuratov.	Moscow 55°45′7″N 37°32′55″E	
12	National Space Center Tower		288.1 (945)	47	2025	Named after Valentina Tereshkova, the Soviet cosmonaut and first woman in space; the headquarters of Roscosmos. Designed by UNK.	Moscow 55°45′44″N 37°29′37″E	
13	Moscow Towers		283.4 (930)	62	2024	Formerly known as Grand Tower. Designed by Werner Sobek.	Moscow 55°45′3″N 37°32′27″E	
14*	Five Towers		274 (899)	75	2026	Designed by Oleg Klodt, VSA studio and Leila Ulukhanli.	Moscow 55°42′11″N 37°35′33″E	
15	Naberezhnaya Tower, Tower C		268.4 (881)	59	2007	Tallest building in Europe from 2007 to 2010; surpassed by the Moscow Tower of City of Capitals. Designed by RTKL Associates and ENKA.	Moscow 55°44′48″N 37°32′13″E	
16	Triumph Palace		264.1 (866)	57	2006	Tallest building in Europe from 2005 to 2007; surpassed by Naberezhnaya Tower. Tallest residential building in Europe from 2006 to 2010, surpassed by the Moscow Tower of City of Capitals. Designed by Tromos.	Moscow 55°47′54″N 37°31′15″E	
17	City of Capitals, Saint Petersburg Tower		257.2 (844)	65	2010	Designed by NBBJ and Erick van Egeraat.	Moscow 55°44′51″N 37°32′21″E	
18	iCity, Space Tower		256 (840)	61	2025	The complex containing two towers was designed by a German-American architect Helmut Jahn and his firm Jahn Architecture. The atrium is designed by a German architect Werner Sobek.	Moscow 55°45′19″N 37°31′49″E	
19	Evolution Tower		245.9 (807)	55	2015	Earned the 2nd place title in the Emporis Skyscraper Award 2015 competition for world's best skyscraper. It became a finalist for the 2016 MIPIM Awards and for the 2015 CTBUH Best Tall Building Awards. Designed by RMJM, Tony Kettle in collaboration with University of Edinburgh's Professor of Art Karen Forbes, and Philipp Nikandrov.	Moscow 55°44′54″N 37°32′30″E	
20	Federation, West Tower		242.5 (796)	62	2008	Designed by Sergei Tchoban.	Moscow 55°44′59″N 37°32′14″E	
21	Moscow State University		240 (787)	36	1953	The headquarters of Moscow State University, and the tallest among the "Seven Sisters". It was the tallest building in Europe from 1953 to 1990, surpassed by the Messeturm in Germany. The tallest educational building in the world. Designed by Boris Iofan, Lev Rudnev, Sergey Chernyshyov, Pavel Abrosimov, Alexander Khryakov, and Vsevolod Nasonov.	Moscow 55°42′11″N 37°31′51″E	
22	Imperia Tower	framless	238.6 (783)	60	2011	Designed by NBBJ.	Moscow 55°44′53″N 37°32′25″E	
23*	Severny Port, Tower 7.3		228 (748)	58	2028		Moscow 55°51′55″N 37°27′32″E	
24	OKO, North Tower		224.5 (737)	49	2014	Designed by Skidmore, Owings and Merrill.	Moscow 55°45′0″N 37°32′4″E	
25 =	Level Yuzhnoportovaya, Tower 1		224.4 (736)	69	2026	Designed by SPEECH architectural office.	Moscow 55°42′21″N 37°41′38″E	
25* =	Level Yuzhnoportovaya, Tower 3		224.4 (736)	69	2027	Designed by SPEECH architectural office.	Moscow 55°42′21″N 37°41′44″E	
27	House on Mosfilmovskaya, Tower 1		213.3 (700)	54	2011	Arch Moscow 2005 winner. Sculpturally twisted "living snail" form by Sergey Skuratov.	Moscow 55°43′24″N 37°31′41″E	
28	Iset Tower		212.8 (698)	52	2016		Yekaterinburg	
29	Hotel Ukraina		206 (676)	34	1957	One of the "Seven Sisters". It was the tallest hotel in the world from 1955 until the Westin Peachtree Plaza Hotel opened in 1976. Designed by Arkady Mordvinov, Vyacheslav Oltarzhevsky, and Pavel Krasilnikov.	Moscow 55°45′5″N 37°33′55″E	
30 =	MOD, Tower 7 (Dreiser Tower)		200 (656)	55	2025	Tallest twin towers in Moscow, along with MOD Mann Tower. Designed by Kleinewelt Architekten.	Moscow 55°47′54″N 37°37′28″E	
30 =	MOD, Tower 3 (Mann Tower)		200 (656)	55	2025	Tallest twin towers in Moscow, along with MOD Dreiser Tower. Designed by Kleinewelt Architekten.	Moscow 55°47′52″N 37°37′31″E	
30* =	Obrucheva 30, Tower 1		200 (656)	60	2026		Moscow 55°39′22″N 37°31′50″E	
30* =	Jois, Tower Anna		200 (656)	57	2027	Designed by Andy Snow and Genpro.	Moscow 55°46′26″N 37°30′26″E	
34	Will Towers, Tower 3		199 (653)	56	2024	Designed by Sergei Tchoban and SPEECH architectural office.	Moscow 55°42′29″N 37°29′33″E	
35	Fili City, Famous Tower		198.1 (650)	57	2025	Designed by ADM architects.	Moscow 55°44′32″N 37°30′35″E	
36 =	Upside Towers, Elbrus Tower		198 (650)	55	2026		Moscow 55°48′42″N 37°36′24″E	
36* =	Veer 1, Tower 5		198 (650)	59	2028		Moscow 55°42′29″N 37°26′19″E	
36* =	Veer 1, Tower 6		198 (650)	59	2028		Moscow 55°42′32″N 37°26′20″E	
39	Wellton Towers, Tower 2		195.2 (640)	58	2022	Designed by Yulia Soldatenkova and A-Project.	Moscow 55°46′25″N 37°28′28″E	
40	Tricolor, Tower A		194 (636)	58	2015		Moscow 55°50′08″N 37°39′30″E	
41	Sberbank City, Tower A		193 (633)	47	2021	Designed by Eller + Eller GmbH Architekten.	Moscow 55°44′34″N 37°31′50″E	
42 =	Continental		191 (627)	48	2011		Moscow 55°46′49″N 37°26′59″E	
42 =	D1, Kingchess Tower		191 (627)	60	2021	Designed by KAMEN architects.	Moscow 55°48′32″N 37°34′43″E	
42 =	D1, Excelsior Tower		191 (627)	59	2021	Designed by KAMEN architects.	Moscow 55°48′31″N 37°34′42″E	
45 =	Tricolor, Tower B		190 (623)	56	2015		Moscow 55°50′04″N 37°39′29″E	
45 =	Symphony 34, Graphite Tower		190 (623)	54	2024	Designed by Kleinewelt Architekten.	Moscow 55°48′22″N 37°34′16″E	
47	Vysotsky		188.3 (618)	53	2011		Yekaterinburg	
48	Sparrow Hills, Tower 2		188.2 (617)	49	2005		Moscow 55°42′51″N 37°30′20″E	
49 =	Level Michurinsky, Tower 1		186 (610)	54	2025		Moscow 55°41′16″N 37°28′24″E	
49* =	High Life, K4 Sense Tower		186 (610)	48	2027		Moscow 55°43′29″N 37°38′48″E	
51 =	Will Towers, Tower 1		184.8 (606)	52	2024	Designed by Sergei Tchoban and SPEECH architectural office.	Moscow 55°42′34″N 37°29′36″E	
51 =	Will Towers, Tower 2		184.8 (606)	52	2024	Designed by Sergei Tchoban and SPEECH architectural office.	Moscow 55°42′32″N 37°29′36″E	
53	AFI Tower		182.4 (598)	53	2024		Moscow 55°50′56″N 37°39′1″E	
54* =	River Park Kutuzovsky, Tower 1 (Topaz)		179.9 (590)	46	2026	Designed by ADM architects.	Moscow 55°44′44″N 37°31′16″E	
54* =	River Park Kutuzovsky, Tower 2 (Emerald)		179.9 (590)	46	2026	Designed by ADM architects.	Moscow 55°44′42″N 37°31′20″E	
54* =	River Park Kutuzovsky, Tower 3 (Diamond)		179.9 (590)	46	2027	Designed by ADM architects.	Moscow 55°44′41″N 37°31′22″E	
54* =	River Park Kutuzovsky, Tower 4 (Lazur)		179.9 (590)	46	2027	Designed by ADM architects.	Moscow 55°44′40″N 37°31′17″E	
54* =	River Park Kutuzovsky, Tower 5 (Amber)		179.9 (590)	46	2026	Designed by ADM architects.	Moscow 55°44′42″N 37°31′15″E	
59 =	City Bay, Indian Ocean Tower 1		179 (587)	52	2024		Moscow 55°49′50″N 37°24′13″E	
59 =	City Bay, Indian Ocean Tower 6		179 (587)	52	2024		Moscow 55°49′51″N 37°24′05″E	
59 =	City Bay, Atlantic Ocean Tower 1		179 (587)	53	2025		Moscow 55°49′52″N 37°23′58″E	
59 =	City Bay, Atlantic Ocean Tower 2		179 (587)	53	2025		Moscow 55°49′50″N 37°23′56″E	
59* =	City Bay, Atlantic Ocean Tower 3		179 (587)	53	2026		Moscow 55°49′49″N 37°23′55″E	
64* =	Sobytye-4, Tower 1		178.4 (585)	51	2027		Moscow 55°41′32″N 37°28′37″E	
64 =	Sobytye-4, Tower 2		178.4 (585)	51	2025		Moscow 55°41′34″N 37°28′38″E	
64 =	Sobytye-4, Tower 3		178.4 (585)	51	2025		Moscow 55°41′36″N 37°28′35″E	
67	Wave, Tower Azure		178 (584)	52	2026		Moscow 55°38′14″N 37°42′21″E	
68	IQ-quarter, Tower 2		177.5 (582)	42	2017	Designed by NBBJ.	Moscow 55°44′52″N 37°32′5″E	
69	Wellton Towers, Tower 1		177.2 (581)	53	2022	Designed by Yulia Soldatenkova and A-Project.	Moscow 55°46′26″N 37°28′24″E	
70	Sparrow Hills, Tower 1		176.5 (579)	42	2004		Moscow 55°42′53″N 37°30′17″E	
71 =	Kotelnicheskaya Embankment Building		176 (577)	32	1952	First skyscraper in Moscow and Europe. One of the "Seven Sisters". Tallest building in Europe from 1952 to 1953, surpassed by the Moscow State University. Tallest residential building in the world from 1952 to 1960. First residential skyscraper. First skyscraper outside the US. Designed by Dmitry Chechulin and Andrey Rostkovsky.	Moscow 55°44′50″N 37°38′34″E	
71 =	Edelweiss		176 (577)	43	2004		Moscow 55°43′39″N 37°28′48″E	
71 =	Nebo, Tower 1		176 (577)	53	2020	Designed by "Reserv".	Moscow 55°41′44″N 37°29′9″E	
71 =	Nebo, Tower 2		176 (577)	53	2020	Designed by "Reserv".	Moscow 55°41′47″N 37°29′7″E	
71 =	Nebo, Tower 3		176 (577)	53	2020	Designed by "Reserv".	Moscow 55°41′45″N 37°29′4″E	
71 =	Rezhisser, Tower 1		176 (577)	49	2024	Designed by "Meerson and Voronova".	Moscow 55°50′6″N 37°38′21″E	
77	Alye Parusa, Tower 4		175.6 (576)	48	2003		Moscow 55°48′24″N 37°27′0″E	
78*	Level Nizhegorodskaya, Tower 1		175 (574)	47	2026		Moscow 55°44′10″N 37°44′34″E	
79 =	Headliner, Tower 1		174.9 (574)	53	2019	Designed by Moscow's oldest architectural bureau "Ostozhenka".	Moscow 55°45′17″N 37°31′27″E	
79 =	Headliner, Tower 6		174.9 (574)	53	2025	Designed by Moscow's oldest architectural bureau "Ostozhenka".	Moscow 55°45′17″N 37°31′33″E	
79 =	Headliner, Tower 8		174.9 (574)	53	2023	Designed by Moscow's oldest architectural bureau "Ostozhenka".	Moscow 55°45′10″N 37°31′38″E	
82	Symphony 34, Crystal Tower		173.8 (570)	49	2024	Designed by Kleinewelt Architekten.	Moscow 55°48′21″N 37°34′12″E	
83	Sparrow Hills, Tower 3		172.2 (565)	42	2004		Moscow 55°42′53″N 37°30′23″E	
84	Ministry of Foreign Affairs		172 (564)	27	1953	The headquarters of the Ministry of Foreign Affairs of Russia. One of the "Seven Sisters". Designed by Vladimir Helfreich and Mikhail Minkus.	Moscow 55°44′46″N 37°35′3″E	
85	Nordstar Tower		171.5 (563)	42	2008		Moscow 55°46′34″N 37°33′11″E	
86 =	Architektor, Tower 1		169.2 (555)	47	2024		Moscow 55°39′24″N 37°31′19″E	
86 =	Architektor, Tower 2		169.2 (555)	47	2024		Moscow 55°39′23″N 37°31′24″E	
88	Architektor, Tower 3		168.7 (553)	46	2024		Moscow 55°39′22″N 37°31′20″E	
89*	Jois, Tower Leo		168.4 (552) appr.	48	2027		Moscow 55°46′25″N 37°30′25″E	
90	Alcon Tower		168 (551)	36	2023	The initial height of the towers was planned to be 33 floors and 150 meters, but was increased to 39 floors and 168 meters. Designed by Evgeniy Gerasimov.	Moscow 55°47′7″N 37°34′5″E	
91	Sberbank City, Tower B		167.6 (550)	41	2021	Designed by Eller + Eller GmbH Architekten.	Moscow 55°44′33″N 37°31′53″E	
92	Crystal, Tower 8		167.5 (550)	47	2023		Moscow 55°46′55″N 37°27′49″E	
93 =	Swissôtel Krasnye Holmy		165 (541)	34	2005	Designed by TTA and Woods Bagot.	Moscow 55°44′0″N 37°38′38″E	
93 =	Oruzheyniy		165 (541)	27	2016	The building’s height is officially recorded as 120 metres (394 ft) by the CTBUH, but it reaches 165 metres (541 ft) due to a decorative spire, first introduced in 2014 and installed in 2016 at the initiative of Moscow’s Deputy Mayor for Urban Development, Marat Khusnullin. Designed by Mikhail Posokhin.	Moscow 55°46′25″N 37°36′19″E	
93 =	Zagorye		165 (541)	48	2013	Designed by Central Research Institute of Building Structures named after V. A. Kucherenko JSC "Research Center "Construction"" (TsNIISK).	Moscow 55°34′47″N 37°40′16″E	
93 =	Paveletskaya City, Marlon Tower		165 (541)	46	2023		Moscow 55°43′6″N 37°38′10″E	
93 =	Paveletskaya City, Frank Tower		165 (541)	46	2023		Moscow 55°43′7″N 37°38′14″E	
98	MOD, Tower 5		164.6 (540)	44	2025	Designed by Kleinewelt Architekten.	Moscow 55°47′48″N 37°37′29″E	
99*	City Bay, North Ocean 8 Tower		163 (535) appr.	49	2027		Moscow 55°49′46″N 37°24′19″E	
100 =	WellHouse na Leninskom		162 (531)	47	2010		Moscow 55°39′42″N 37°30′34″E	
100* =	Upside Towers, Atlas Tower		162 (531)	46	2027		Moscow 55°48′40″N 37°36′27″E	
102*	Polar, Tower 1.5		161.6 (530)	50	2027		Moscow 55°53′37″N 37°38′44″E	
103* =	Level Michurinsky, Tower 8		161 (528)	48	2026		Moscow 55°41′12″N 37°28′0″E	
103* =	Upside Towers, Monte Bianko Tower		161 (528)	45	2027		Moscow 55°48′43″N 37°36′34″E	
105 =	Seliger City, Van Gogh Tower		160 (525)	43	2023		Moscow 55°51′38″N 37°32′50″E	
105 =	Sydney City, Tower 2.2		160 (525)	46	2025		Moscow 55°46′4″N 37°30′16″E	
105* =	City Bay, North Ocean 1 Tower		160 (525) appr.	48	2027		Moscow 55°49′47″N 37°24′27″E	
105* =	Paveletskaya City, Impulse Tower		160 (525)	45	2027		Moscow 55°42′54″N 37°38′7″E	
109	Headliner, Tower 4		158.5 (520) appr.	48	2019	Designed by Moscow's oldest architectural bureau "Ostozhenka".	Moscow 55°45′5″N 37°31′40″E	
110	Wellton Towers, Tower 3		157.2 (516)	48	2022	Designed by Yulia Soldatenkova and A-Project.	Moscow 55°46′24″N 37°28′29″E	
111	Serdtse Stolicy, Tower 1		156.6 (514)	44	2023	Designed by Sergei Tchoban.	Moscow 55°45′50″N 37°30′35″E	
112	Level Michurinsky, Tower 4		156.5 (513)	45	2025		Moscow 55°41′16″N 37°28′16″E	
113 =	Kudrinskaya Square Building		156 (512)	22	1954	One of the "Seven Sisters". Designed by Mikhail Posokhin and Ashot Mndoyants.	Moscow 55°45′33″N 37°34′51″E	
113 =	Presnya City, Tower 1		156 (512)	44	2018		Moscow 55°46′13″N 37°33′50″E	
113 =	Presnya City, Tower 2		156 (512)	44	2018		Moscow 55°46′15″N 37°33′51″E	
113 =	Presnya City, Tower 3		156 (512)	44	2018		Moscow 55°46′15″N 37°33′54″E	
117 =	Savyolovskiy City, Tower B2 Ellington		155.6 (510)	47	2017		Moscow 55°48′13″N 37°35′28″E	
117 =	Savyolovskiy City, Tower C1 Contraine		155.6 (510)	47	2017		Moscow 55°48′11″N 37°35′29″E	
117 =	Savyolovskiy City, Tower C2 Armstrong		155.6 (510)	47	2018		Moscow 55°48′9″N 37°35′31″E	
120*	Akvamarin		155.5 (510)	44	2021		Vladivostok	
121 =	Avenue 77, Tower A		155 (509)	45	2009		Moscow 55°38′12″N 37°35′56″E	
121 =	Avenue 77, Tower B		155 (509)	45	2009		Moscow 55°38′15″N 37°35′56″E	
121 =	Avenue 77, Tower C		155 (509)	45	2009		Moscow 55°38′15″N 37°36′01″E	
121 =	Sydney City, Tower 3		155 (509)	44	2023		Moscow 55°46′1″N 37°30′7″E	
121* =	Sydney City, Tower 5.2		155 (509)	44	2026		Moscow 55°46′1″N 37°30′22″E	
121* =	Obrucheva 30, Tower 2		155 (509)	45	2026	Designed by KAMEN architects.	Moscow 55°39′23″N 37°31′44″E	
127*	Level Yuzhnoportovaya, Tower 2		154.9 (508)	49	2027	Designed by SPEECH architectural office.	Moscow 55°42′21″N 37°41′41″E	
128*	Veer 1, Tower 3		154.4 (507) appr.	46	2028		Moscow 55°42′33″N 37°26′14″E	
129	Dirigible		153 (502)	40	2012	Designed by Alexey Bavykin.	Moscow 55°39′56″N 37°32′52″E	
130*	Set, Tower 3		151.8 (498) appr.	45	2028		Moscow	
131 =	Hide, River Side Tower		151.7 (498)	41	2024	Designed by ADM architects.	Moscow 55°43′55″N 37°32′29″E	
131 =	Hide, Park Lane Tower		151.7 (498)	41	2024	Designed by ADM architects.	Moscow 55°43′57″N 37°32′28″E	
131 =	Hide, West Dale Tower		151.7 (498)	41	2024	Designed by ADM architects.	Moscow 55°43′56″N 37°32′25″E	
134	Symphony 34, Silver Tower		151.6 (497)	43	2024	Designed by Kleinewelt Architekten.	Moscow 55°48′22″N 37°34′19″E	
135	Gazprom Tower		151 (495)	35	1995	First skyscraper in post-Soviet states after dissolution of the Soviet Union. Designed by Vladimir Khavin.	Moscow 55°39′32″N 37°33′24″E	
136	Sverdlovsk		150.9 (495)	37	2015		Yekaterinburg	
137 =	Paveletskaya City, Viv'en Tower		150.6 (494) appr.	42	2025		Moscow 55°43′3″N 37°38′12″E	
137 =	Wave, Tower Indigo		150.6 (494) appr.	44	2026		Moscow 55°38′15″N 37°42′25″E	
139 =	Zilart, Tower 9		150 (492)	40	2023	Designed by SPEECH architectural office.	Moscow 55°41′56″N 37°38′27″E	
139 =	iCity, Time Tower		150 (492)	34	2025	The complex containing two towers was designed by a German-American architect Helmut Jahn and his firm Jahn Architecture. The atrium is designed by a German architect Werner Sobek.	Moscow 55°45′17″N 37°31′50″E	
139 =	Sky Garden, Tower 1.1		150 (492)	43	2025	Designed by Ginsburg Architects.	Moscow 55°50′12″N 37°25′19″E	
139 =	Sky Garden, Tower 1.2		150 (492)	43	2025	Designed by Ginsburg Architects.	Moscow 55°50′13″N 37°25′24″E	
139* =	Zilart, Mark Tower 1		150 (492)	43	2027	Designed by UNK.	Moscow 55°41′20″N 37°38′2″E	
139* =	Sky Garden, Tower 2.1		150 (492)	44	2027	Designed by Ginsburg Architects.	Moscow 55°50′9″N 37°25′27″E	
139* =	Sky Garden, Tower 2.2		150 (492)	44	2027	Designed by Ginsburg Architects.	Moscow 55°50′7″N 37°25′24″E	
139* =	Sky Garden, Tower 3		150 (492)	44	2027	Designed by Ginsburg Architects.	Moscow 55°50′7″N 37°25′20″E	
139* =	Slava, Tower F		150 (492)	43	2027		Moscow 55°46′52″N 37°34′55″E	
139* =	Zilart, Tower 21-3		150 (492)	43	2027		Moscow	

== Tallest buildings proposed, approved, or under construction ==
=== Under Construction ===
Rank	Name	Image	Location	Height m (ft)	Stories	Construction Begins	Planned Construction End	Notes	Ref.
1	Lakhta Center II		Saint Petersburg	703 metres (2,306 ft)	150	2023	2035		
2	Lakhta Center III		Saint Petersburg	555 metres (1,821 ft)	108	2025	2031		
3	Wildberries Bagration Bridge Tower		Moscow	440 metres (1,440 ft)	80	2026	2030		
4	Akhmat Tower		Grozny	435 metres (1,427 ft)	102	2016		On Hold (Construction is expected to resume soon, in December 2026)	
5	Aurus Residences Tower 1		Moscow	395 metres (1,296 ft)	100	2026	2032		
6	One Tower		Moscow	380 metres (1,250 ft)	90	2019	2029		
5	Dau House		Moscow	340 metres (1,120 ft)	87	2024	2028		
6	Aurus Residences Tower 2		Moscow	339 metres (1,112 ft)	85	2026	2032		
7	Slava 5 Tower		Moscow	330 metres (1,080 ft)	67	2025	2030		
8	Parus		Yekaterinburg	300 metres (980 ft)	75	2026	2031		
9	Top Tower		Moscow	298 metres (978 ft)	64	2025	2030		
10	5 Towers Phase 1		Moscow	274 metres (899 ft)	69	2018	2028		
11	Sezar Tower		Moscow	228 metres (748 ft)	54	2025	2028		
12	Level South Port		Moscow	225 metres (738 ft)	69	2022	2026		
13	MFK Crocus City		Krasnogorsk	217 metres (712 ft)	51	2014		On Hold	
14	OPERA Tower		Yekaterinburg	158 metres (518 ft)	42	2013		On Hold	

=== Proposed ===
Rank	Name	Image	Location	Height m (ft)	Stories	Year	Notes	Ref.
1	Neskuchny Home & Spa Tower 4		Moscow	400 metres (1,300 ft)	100	-		
2	Neskuchny Home & Spa Tower 3		Moscow	380 metres (1,250 ft)	90	-		
3	Phenomen Goroda		Moscow	333 metres (1,093 ft)	70	2031		
4	Neskuchny Home & Spa Tower 2		Moscow	286 metres (938 ft)	75	-		

== Unbuilt ==
Rank	Name	Image	Location	Height meters (ft)	Stories	Cancelled	Notes	Ref.
1	Russia Tower		Moscow	612 metres (2,008 ft)	118	2009		
2	Palace of the Soviets		Moscow	495 metres (1,624 ft)	100	1958		
3	Crystal Island		Moscow	450 metres (1,480 ft)	-	2009		
4	Rotating Tower		Moscow	400 metres (1,300 ft)	70	-		
5	Okhta Center		Saint Petersburg	397 metres (1,302 ft)	78	2011		
6	Ural Tower		Yekaterinburg	380 metres (1,250 ft)	80	-		
7	City Hall and City Duma		Moscow	308 metres (1,010 ft)	70	2008		
8	Grand City Moscow		Moscow	275 metres (902 ft)	50	-		
9	Zaryadye Administrative Building		Moscow	275 metres (902 ft)	32	1953		
10	Zvenigorodsky		Moscow	253 metres (830 ft)	62	-		
11	Pervy Nikovaevsky 3 & 4		Yekaterinburg	250 metres (820 ft)	61	-		
12	MICEX Building		Moscow	200 metres (660 ft)	36	-		

== Timeline of tallest buildings ==
This is a list of the history of the tallest buildings in Russia; it includes buildings that once held the title of tallest building in Russia.

Name	Image	Location	Years as tallest	Height meters (ft)	Stories	Ref.
Saints Peter and Paul Cathedral		Saint Petersburg	1733–1952	122.5	-	
Kotelnicheskaya Embankment Building		Moscow	1952–1953	176 metres (577 ft)	32	
Main Building of Moscow State University		Moscow	1953–2006	240 metres (790 ft)	36	
Triumph Palace		Moscow	2006–2007	264.1 metres (866 ft)	57	
Naberezhnaya Tower		Moscow	2007–2009	268.4 metres (881 ft)	61	
City of Capitals (Moscow Tower)		Moscow	2009–2012	301.6 metres (990 ft)	76	
Mercury City Tower		Moscow	2012–2015	338.8 metres (1,112 ft)	75	
OKO (South Tower)		Moscow	2015–2016	354.1 metres (1,162 ft)	85	
Federation Tower		Moscow	2016–2018	374 metres (1,227 ft)	97	
Lakhta Center		Saint Petersburg	2018–present	462 metres (1,516 ft)	87	

== See also ==
- List of tallest Orthodox churches
- List of tallest buildings in Europe
- List of tallest buildings in Moscow
- Ostankino Tower
