= Akhmat Tower =

Stalled supertall skyscraper in Grozny, Russia

MFC "Akhmat Tower"
- МФК "Ахмáт Тáуэр"
- Interactive map of the MFC "Akhmat Tower" area

General information
- Status: On hold
- Type: Residential, office
- Location: Grozny, Chechnya
- Coordinates: 43.3138°N 45.6952°E
- Construction started: 2016
- Estimated completion: Unknown

Height
- Architectural: 435 m (1,427 ft)
- Top floor: 407 m (1,335 ft)
- Observatory: 391 m (1,283 ft)

Technical details
- Floor count: 102
- Floor area: 261,679 m^{2} (2,816,690 sq ft)
- Lifts/elevators: 20

Design and construction
- Architecture firm: Gorprojekt & AS + GG
- Developer: Smart Group

Website
- www.thorntontomasetti.com/project/akhmat-tower

Akhmat Tower (Russian: Ахмáт Тáуэр) is a stalled supertall skyscraper in Grozny, Chechen Republic of Russia. If completed, it would become the second-tallest building in Europe, after the Lakhta Center, the first building in Europe with at least 100 floors, and the tallest building in the Caucasus region, surpassing Azerbaijan’s Baku Tower. Construction began on 2 January 2016, and piling work was completed by September 2016. Although the tower was originally scheduled for completion in 2020, it remained incomplete as of November 2024.

The tower is named after Akhmad Kadyrov, the first president of the Chechen Republic.

The building is planned to be 435 m (1,427 ft) tall, with 102 floors. Its design is heavily influenced by Vainakh tower architecture, drawing inspiration from traditional military towers. The tower is planned to incorporate offices, apartments, a five-star hotel, parking facilities, a museum, and public spaces.

== Architecture ==
The building incorporates elements of traditional Chechen Nakh architecture in its skyline and proportions, drawing inspiration from Chechen ethnic tower architecture dating from the 12th century onward.

== See also ==
- Lakhta Center
- Mercury City Tower
- Imperia Tower
- Eurasia (building)
- Moscow International Business Center
- List of tallest buildings in Russia
- List of tallest buildings in Europe
- List of buildings with 100 floors or more
