= One Tower (Moscow) =

Proposed skyscraper in Moscow, Russia

One
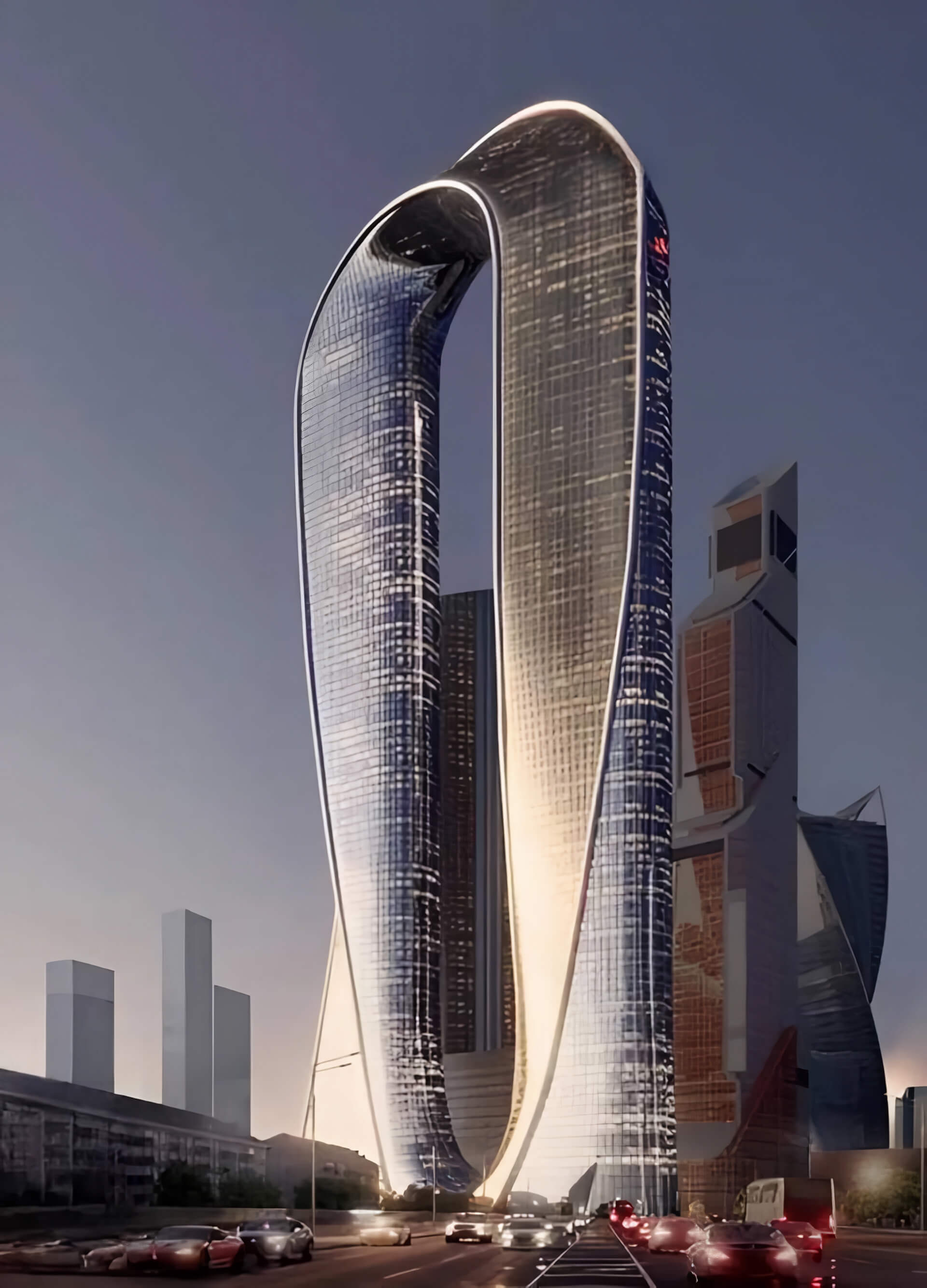
- Interactive map of the One area

General information
- Status: Under construction
- Type: Residential
- Architectural style: high-tech
- Location: Moscow, Russia
- Coordinates: 55.7516°N 37.5397°E
- Groundbreaking: 2019
- Construction started: 2025
- Estimated completion: 2030
- Cost: 49 billion rubles (approx. $690 million)
- Owner: Mosinzhproekt

Height
- Height: 379 m (1,243 ft 5 in)

Technical details
- Floor count: 90

Design and construction
- Architecture firm: Sergey Skuratov Architects

One is an under-construction residential supertall skyscraper along the MIBC on Presnensky District in Moscow. Upon its completion, One Tower will be 379 m (1,243 ft 5 in) with 90 floors. It will be the tallest building in Moscow, and the second-tallest building in Russia and Europe after the Lakhta Center in Saint Petersburg. As a residential building, it will be the tallest in Europe and the second-tallest in the world after Central Park Tower in New York City. The One Tower will also be the first building in Europe with more than 100 floors above ground and will have Europe's highest observation deck on the 100th floor.

In February 2020, media reported that according to an updated urban development plan for a land plot, the skyscraper's height is supposed to be 445.33 m (1,461 ft 1/2 in); at the same time, the architect of this skyscraper proposed to increase the height of the building to 465 m (1,526 ft), which would make this building the tallest in Europe. According to recent media reports the construction cost will be 49 billion rubles (approx. $690 million as of July 2020).

== Gallery ==
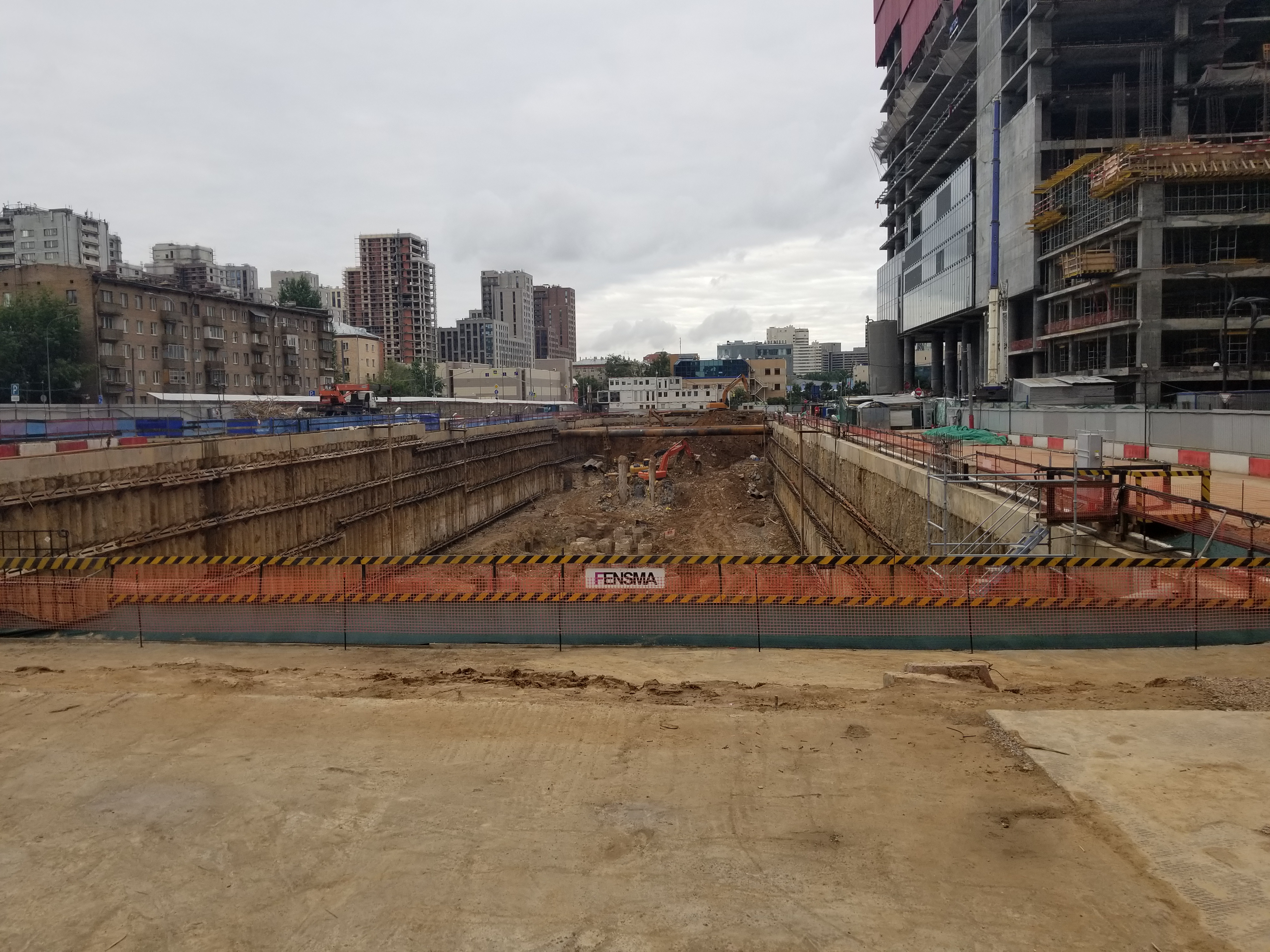
Work on excavation at the construction site in July 2020.

== See also ==
- List of tallest buildings in Moscow
- List of tallest buildings in Russia
- List of tallest buildings in Europe
