= Evolution Tower =

Coordinates: 55°44′54″N 37°32′31″E

- Башня «Эволюция»
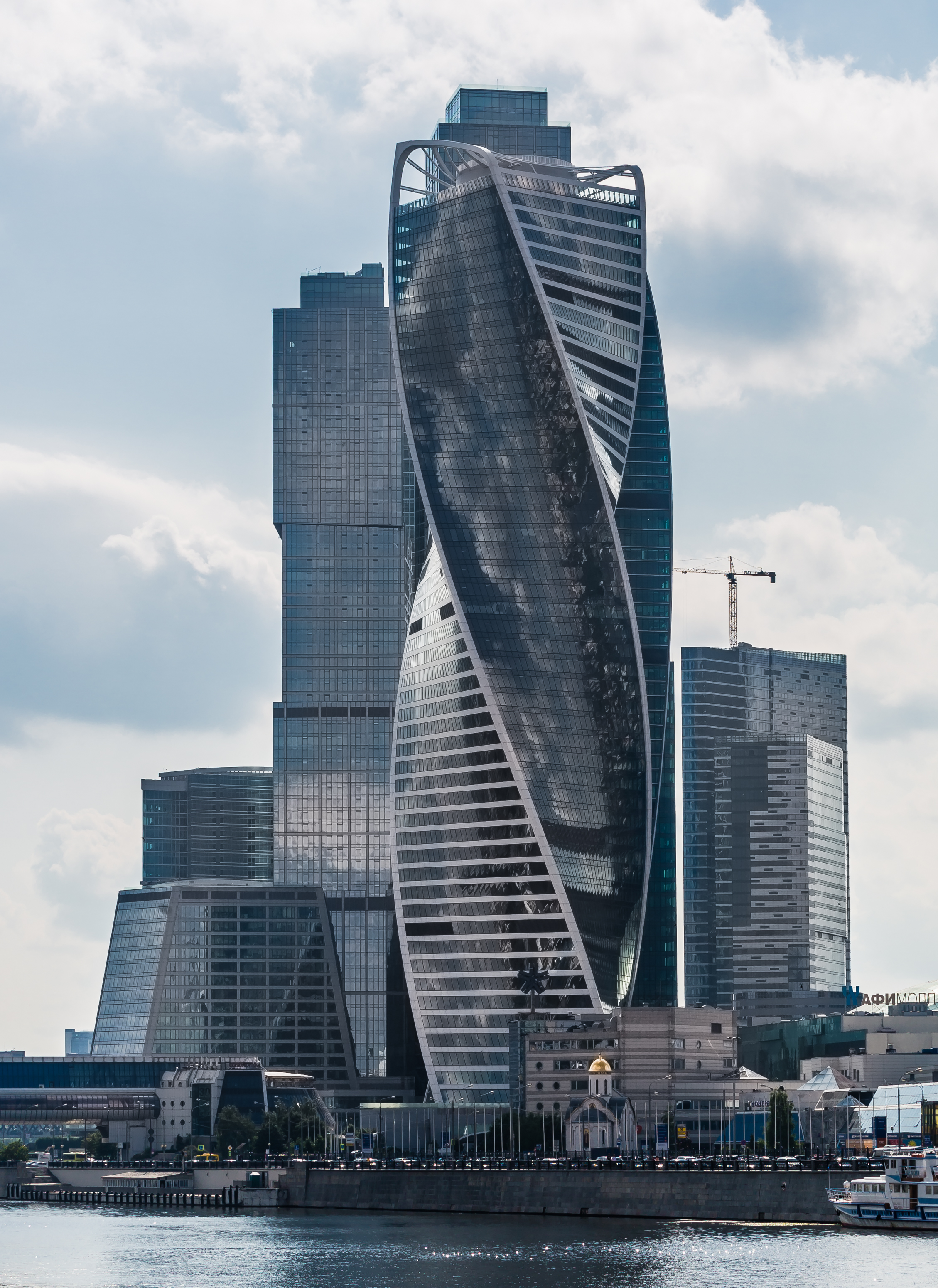
- Interactive map of the Evolution Tower area
- Former names: Wedding Palace, City Palace

General information
- Status: Completed
- Type: Office
- Architectural style: Neo-futurism
- Location: Moscow International Business Center, Moscow,, Russia
- Construction started: 2011
- Completed: 6 October 2014
- Owner: Transneft

Height
- Architectural: 246 m (807 ft)
- Tip: 246 m (807 ft)
- Top floor: 220 m (722 ft)

Technical details
- Floor count: 55
- Floor area: 82,000 m^{2} (882,641 ft^{2}) (tower); 154,000 m^{2} (1,657,642 ft^{2}) (complex); 169,000 m^{2} (1,819,101 ft^{2}) (plot area)
- Lifts/elevators: 17

Design and construction
- Architects: RMJM and Philipp Nikandrov (GORPROJECT)
- Developer: Snegiri Development
- Structural engineer: GK-Techstroy, GORPROJECT
- Main contractor: Rönesans Holding

The Evolution Tower (Russian: Башня «Эволюция», romanized: Bashnya "Evolyutsiya") is a skyscraper located on plots 2 and 3 of the MIBC in Moscow, Russia. The 55-story office building has a height of 246 metres (807 ft) and a total area of 169,000 square metres (1,820,000 sq ft). Noted in Moscow for its futuristic DNA-like shape, the building was designed by British architect Tony Kettle in collaboration with University of Edinburgh's Professor of Art Karen Forbes. Construction of the tower began in 2011 and was completed in late 2014. In 2016, Transneft bought the Evolution Tower for US$1 billion to establish its headquarters. The skyscraper is the twelfth-tallest building in Russia, and the 20th-tallest building in Europe.

== History ==
Initially, companies Snegiri Development and Inteko led by Alexander Chigirinsky and Yelena Baturina respectively had planned on the site to construct a skyscraper named the City Palace, also named the Wedding Palace. However, the project was put on hold when the Great Recession struck. In 2010, Inteko sold the plot to businessman Viktor Rashnikov and his partner Nader Nader. The idea of an office building was then favored over the City Palace and thus resulted in the Evolution Tower. Turkish company Rönesans Holding was to be the general contractor of the new plan.

Construction of the Evolution Tower began in 2011. In August 2011, Gazprombank opened a 7-year credit line with a volume of US$345 million to the developer for the completion of the skyscraper. On October 6, 2014, the tower was completed and put into operation. The exact cost of the building is unknown, but RBK quoted an expert believing it to be between US$446 million to US$520 million.

In 2016, Transneft bought the Evolution Tower for US$1 billion to establish its headquarters.

== Design ==
The Evolution Tower is designed by Tony Kettle and Karen Forbes with assistance later from Philipp Nikandrov, chief architect of engineering firm GORPROJECT. The design is similar to the double helix-shape of DNA. This is possibly why the building reflects two ribbons wrapping around each other: symbolizing the inter-linking of individuals, generations, and families.

The plot covers an area of 2.55 hectares, of which most are landscaped into a terrace while the rest is used for the tower. The tower and the terrace are built on a three-level stylobate designated the Evolution Gallery with an area of 28,000 square metres (300,000 ft^{2}). There are exits from the tower that lead directly to the metro station Vystavochnaya and Bagration Bridge. The roof of the stylobate is made exploitable for fountains, terraces, and cafes. The difference in heights between the top of the stylobate and the embankment is compensated by stairs protected by canopies. Under the stylobate is a multi-level parking area for 1,292 cars.

Each of the 51 floors of the tower is rotated 3 degrees relative to the previous one, so the building is "swirled" by more than 150 degrees. In this way, the central core and eight columns with 15-meter spans between the axes remain strictly vertical all the way up. The spiral geometry is repeated only by four corners of the building. For the project, a self-lifting form-work system was designed, combining the functions of wind protection and working platform. Thanks to this, it was possible to achieve the floor's strength in 6 days. The top of the tower is crowned with two asymmetric "arches" spanning 41 m, visually uniting the two opposite facades. They were produced in Piedmont, Italy, and delivered to Russia.

The Evolution Tower uses the single-glazing facade with cold-mirror SunGuard High Performance glass from Guardian Industries for its windows. A continuous band of curved glazing with an area of 60,000 square metres (650,000 ft^{2}) with a constant inclination in the corners of the tower (approximately 14 degrees to the vertical) creates an optical illusion, reflecting Moscow panoramas turned upside down at an angle of 90 degrees to the horizon.

The building uses Thyssen Krupp's elevator system: two elevator cabins independently circulate in one elevator shaft, which reduced the number of elevator shafts from twelve to ten.

Space of the Evolution Tower would be utilized primarily for office purposes but there would also be shopping galleries, boutiques, restaurants, cafes, a supermarket and banquet halls.

=== Nominations ===
The Evolution Tower earned the 2nd place title in the Emporis Skyscraper Award 2015 competition for world's best skyscraper. It became a finalist for the 2016 MIPIM Awards and for the 2015 CTBUH Best Tall Building Awards. In addition, it was voted Moscow's best office building in 2015, received the grand-prix and national award in the 2015 Glass in Architecture competition, first prize of 2015 national NOPRIZ Awards competition, and voted in the 2016 CRE Award Moscow as Moscow's best class A office building. In 2014 the Evolution Gallery mall (phase 1 of development) was awarded by the city authorities as Moscow's best multi-use building.

== Management ==
Evolution Tower project's original owner was the company City Palace, which is owned by companies Snegiri Development and Inteko led by Alexander Chigirinsky and Yelena Baturina respectively. After the resignation of Yuri Luzhkov as mayor of Moscow, Baturina sold her stake in the project for US$52 million to a Snapbox company's owner Viktor Rashnikov and his partner Nader Nader.

In 2016, Snegiri claimed that Snapbox had unjustly enriched for US$127 million, because Rashnikov and Nader had supposedly purchased the share in Evolution Project at an underestimated price from Elena Baturina and after that hadn't given the right to Snegiri Group to the shares in Russia Tower and Rossiya Hotel as had been provided by the alleged oral agreement. Snapbox denied the existence of the oral agreement and stated that there was in place only a shareholder's agreement which governed exhaustively the rights and obligations of the two sides in respect to the Evolution Project. Besides, it was a direct agreement between Snapbox and Baturina, which was agreed by themselves only.

In July 2014, Russian oil company Transneft announced plans to buy the tower for about US$1 billion. It was expected that the deal would become the largest in the Moscow office market. Officially, the deal took place in early 2016: Transneft bought only office space and, taking into account the changed exchange rate, could pay about US$300 million. City Palace received US$267.6 million of the net profit and was to distribute it among the final beneficiaries - Frental Developments controlled by Chigirinsky and Snapbox Holding controlled by Rashnikov. However, Snapbox didn't receive the money and filed a lawsuit against Chigirinsky and Snegiri Group in a Cypriot court on charges of fraud. In November 2016, the court froze Chigirinsky's assets.

== Construction gallery ==
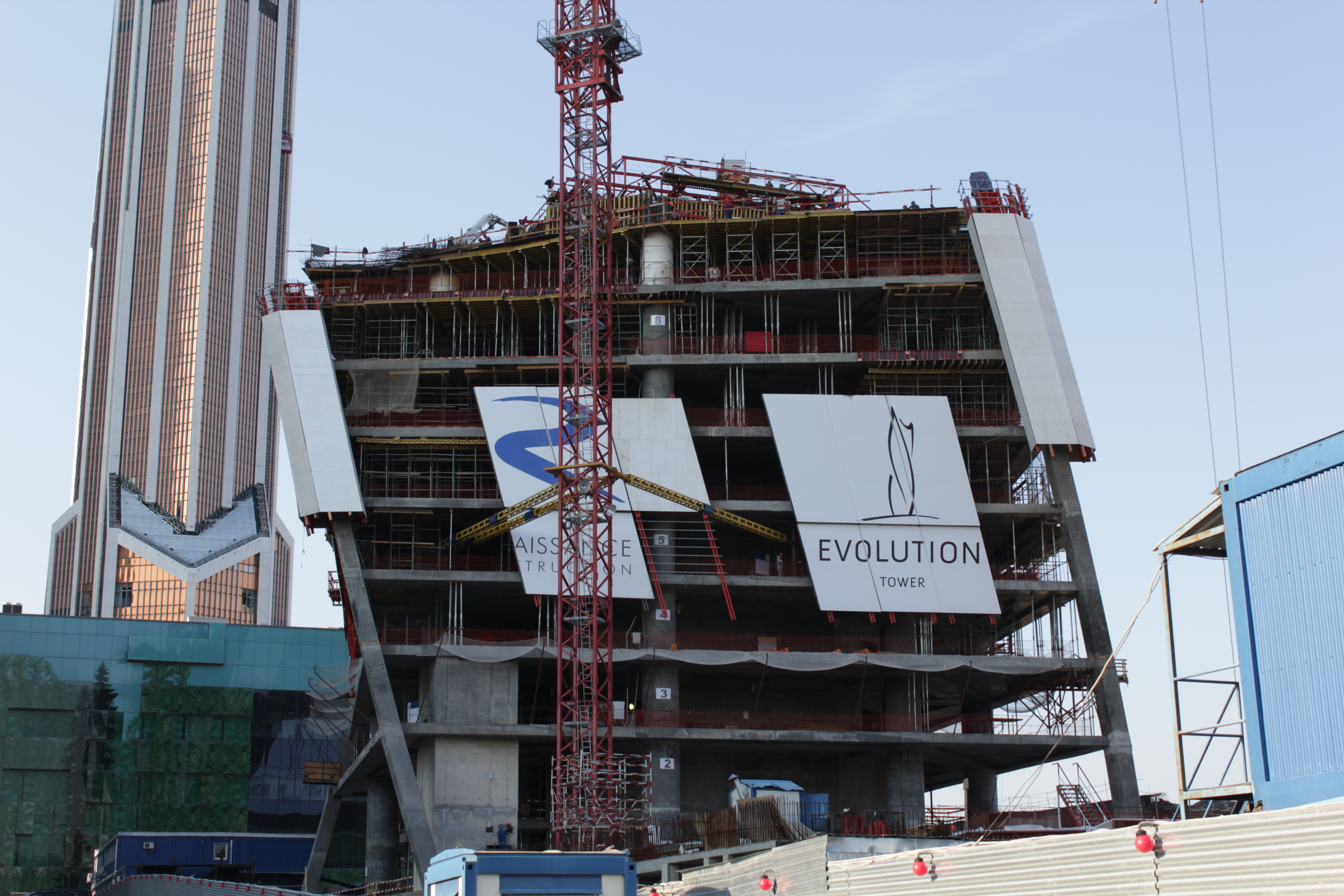
12 September 2012

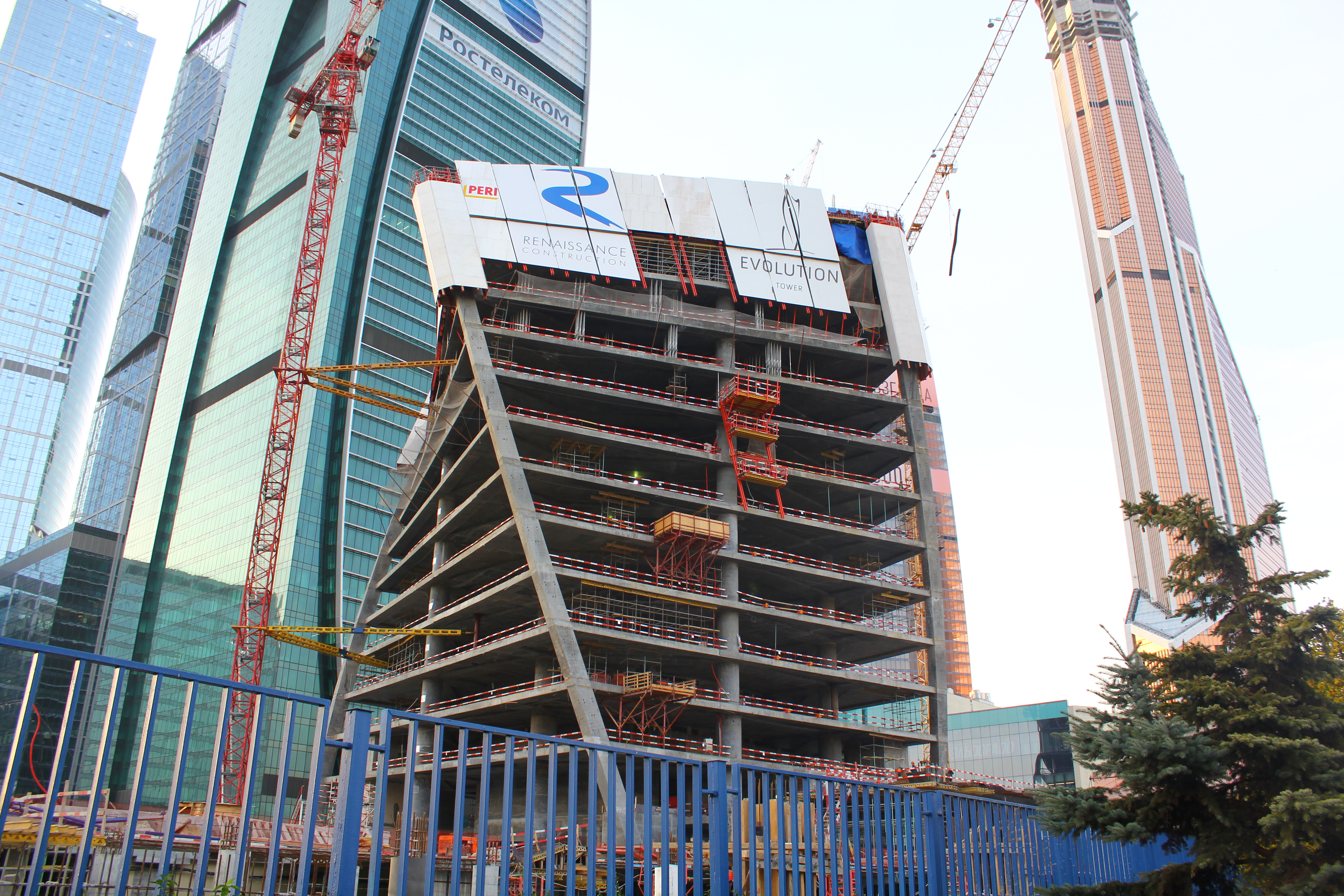
20 October 2012

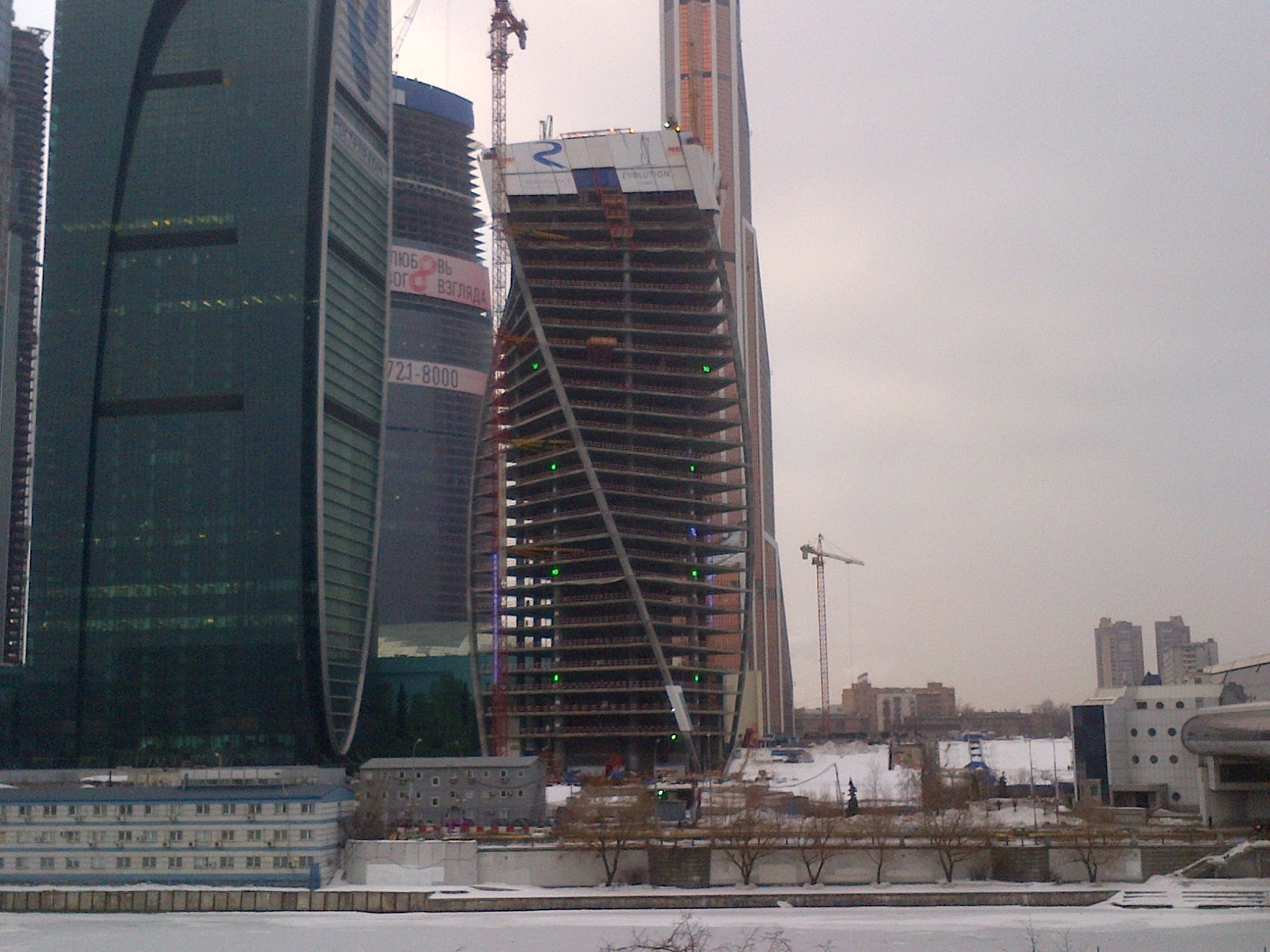
18 February 2013

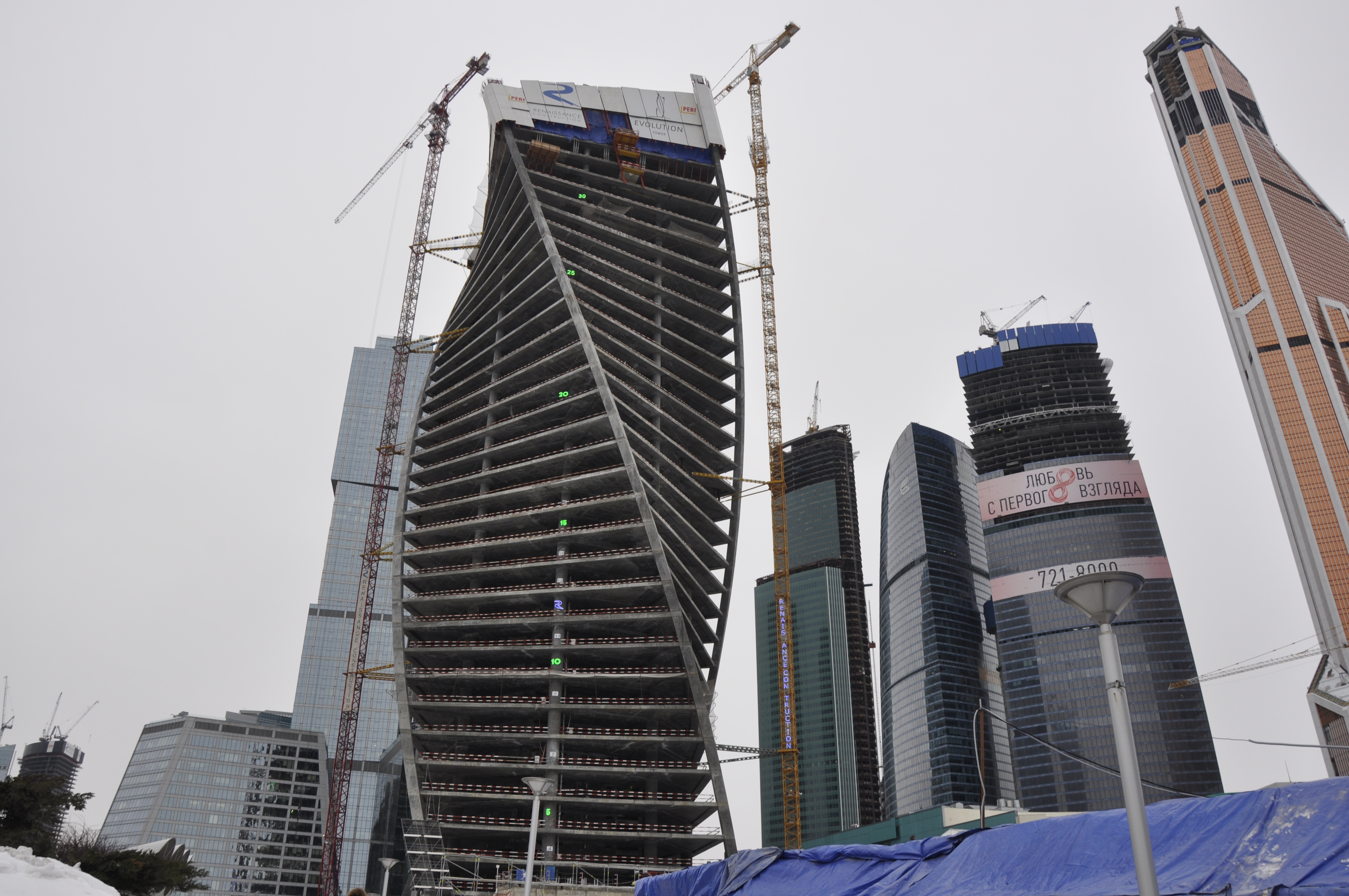
23 March 2013

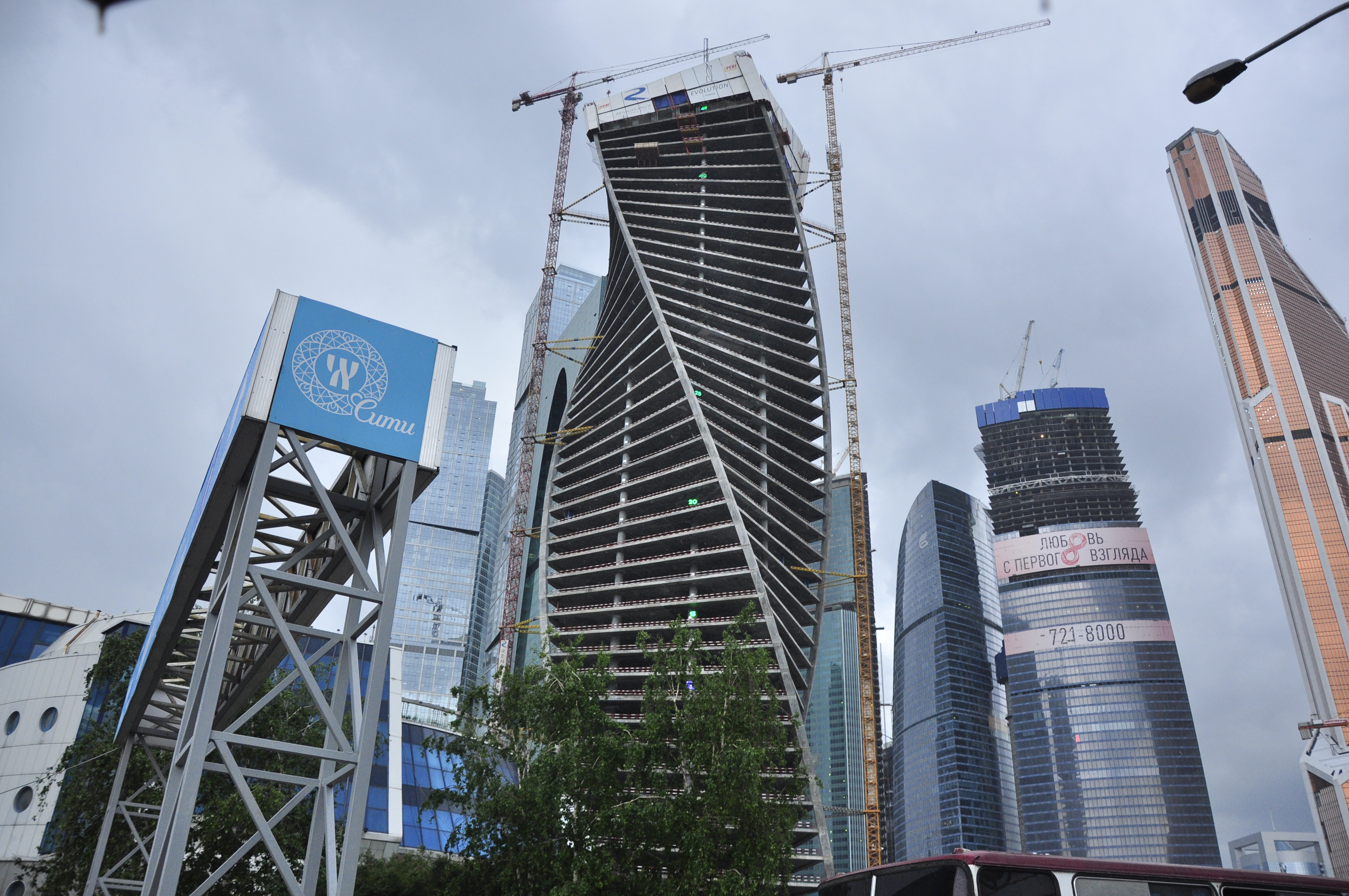
26 May 2013

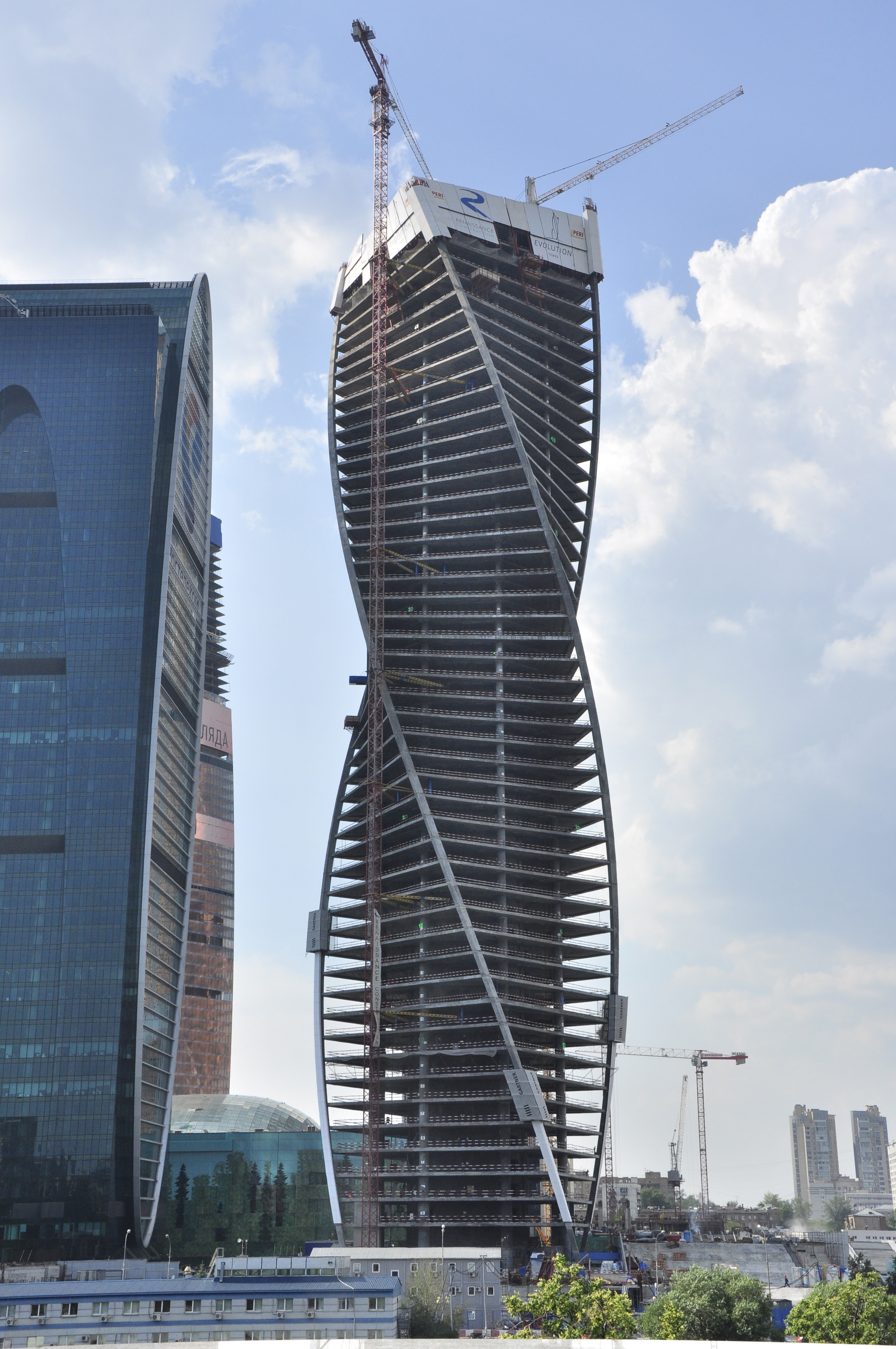
29 June 2013

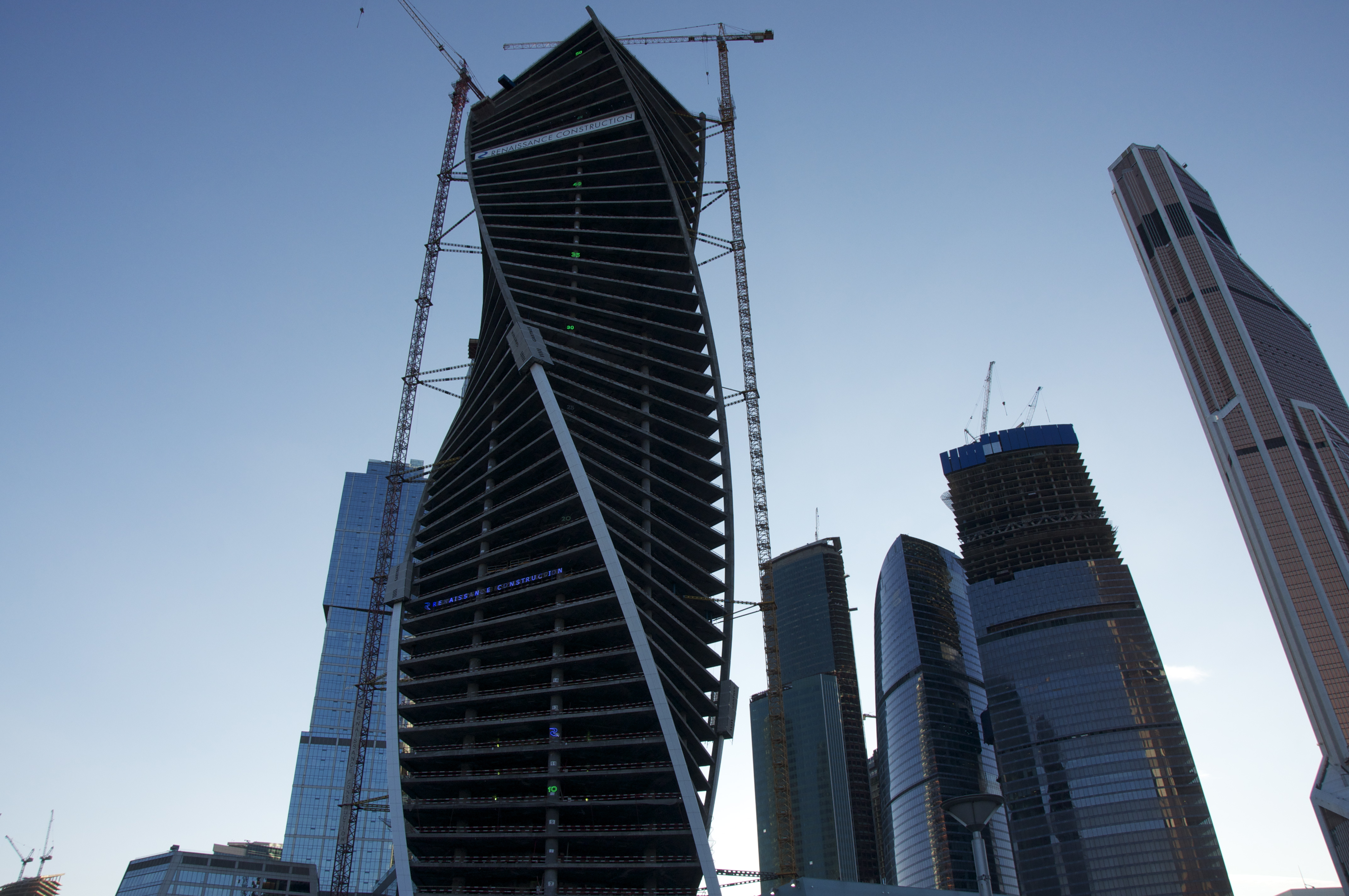
28 August 2013

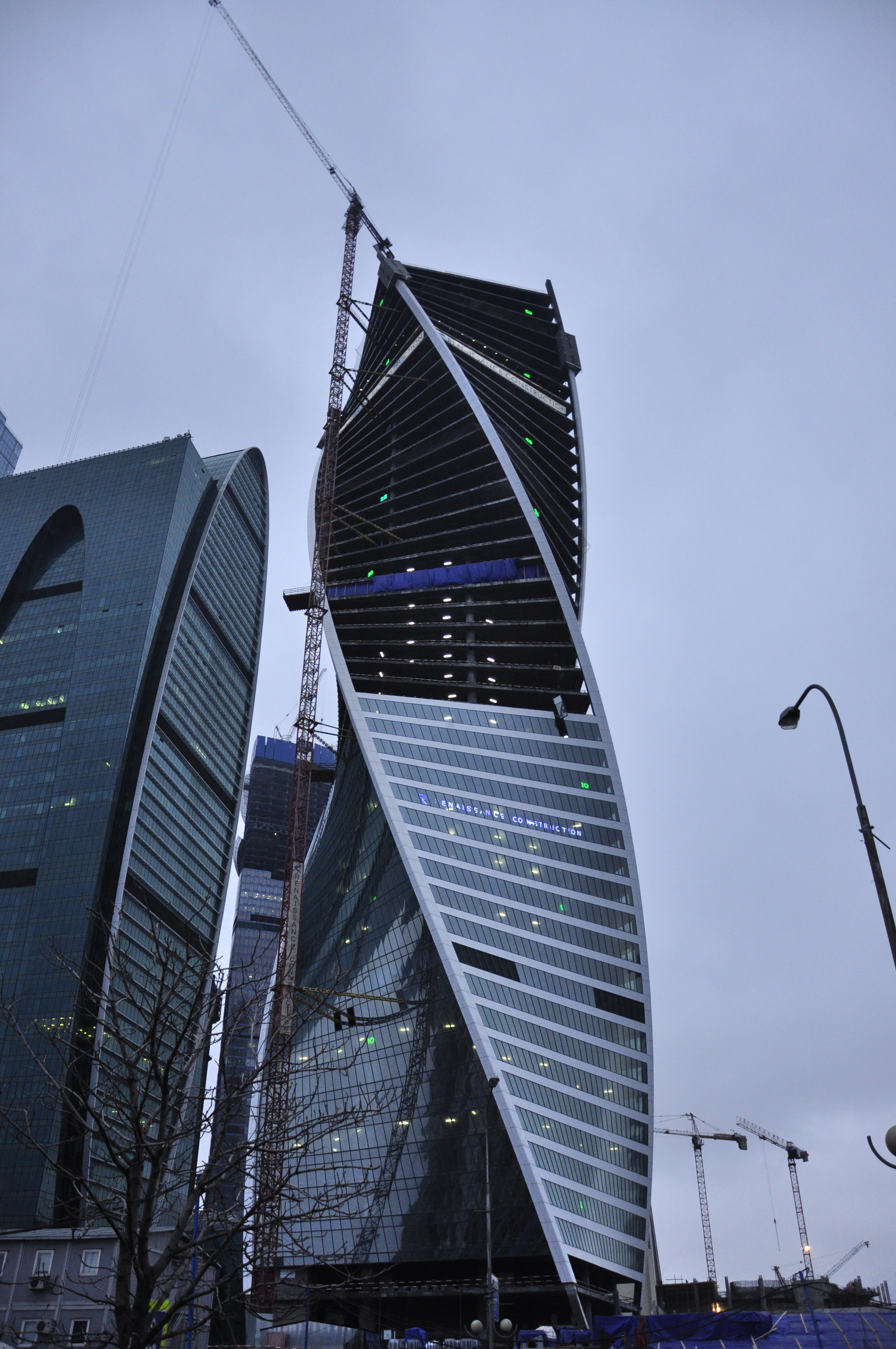
15 February 2014

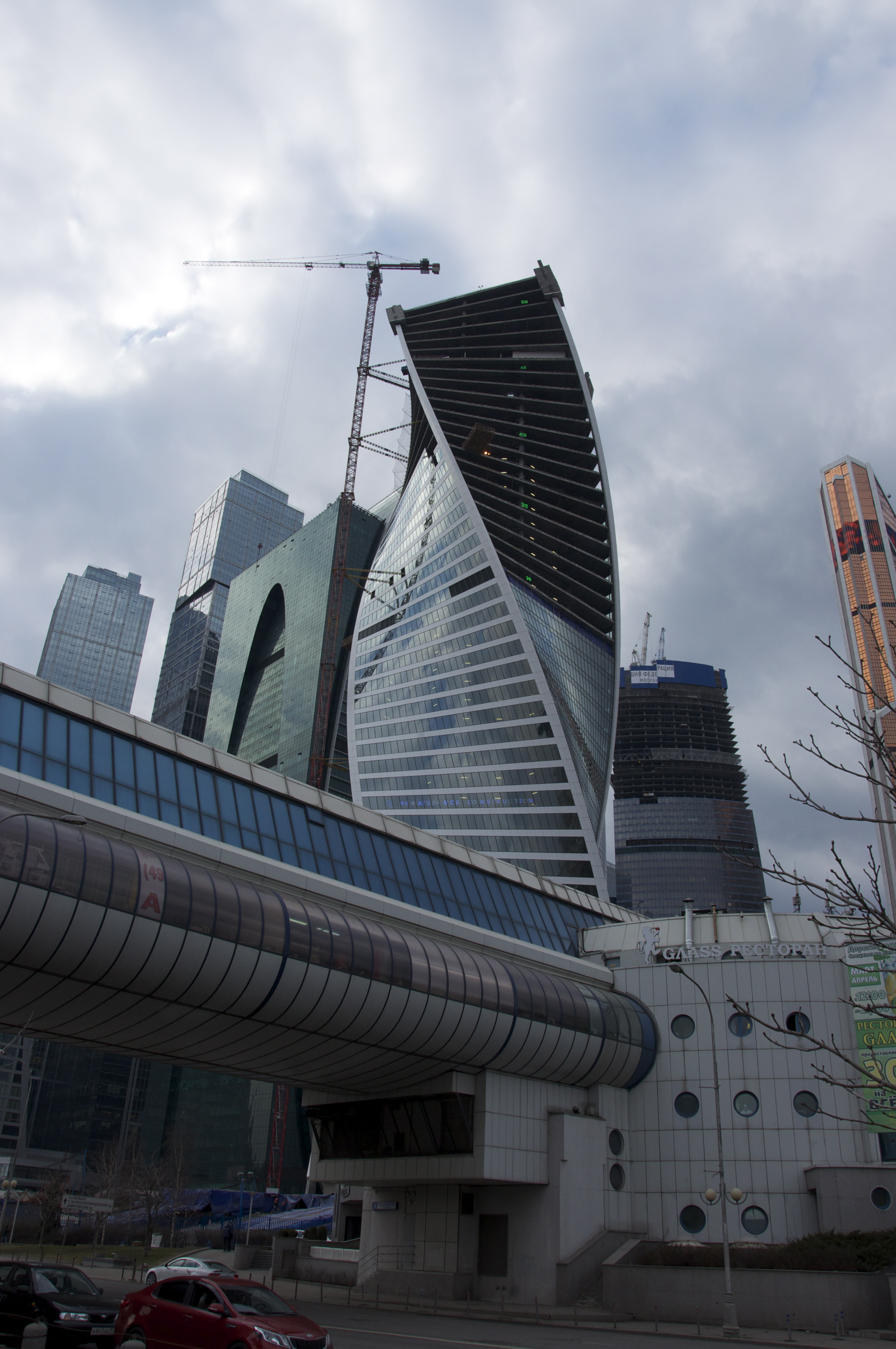
30 March 2014

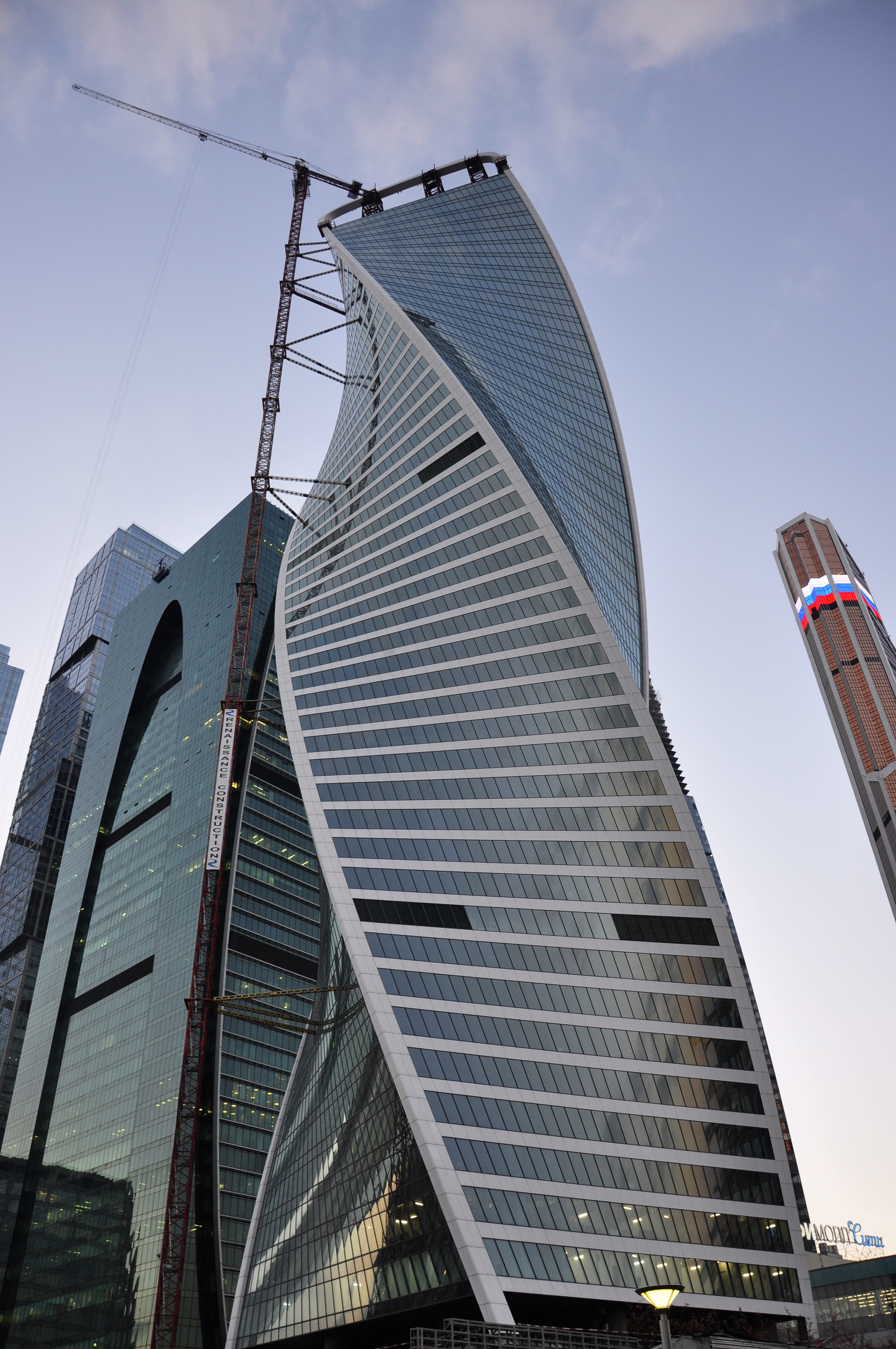
7 October 2014

== See also ==
- List of tallest buildings in Moscow
- List of tallest buildings in Russia
- List of tallest buildings in Europe
- List of twisted buildings
