= Vysotsky (skyscraper) =

Building in Yekaterinburg, Russia

- Высоцкий
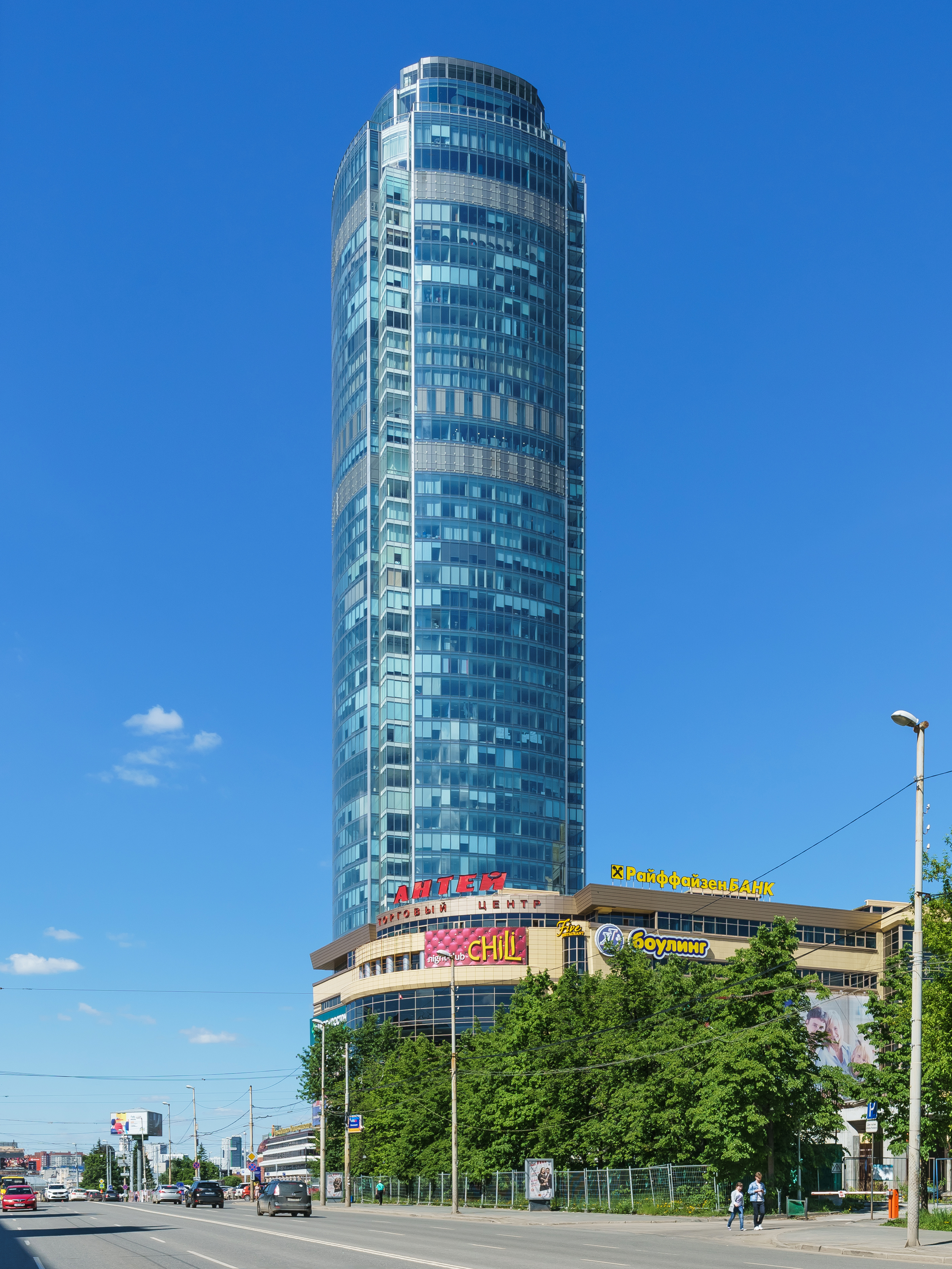
- Interactive map of the Vysotsky area
- Alternative names: Antey-3

General information
- Location: Yekaterinburg, Russia
- Coordinates: 56°50′10.1″N 60°36′52.7″E
- Construction started: 2006
- Completed: 2011
- Cost: US$150 million

Height
- Architectural: 188.3 m (618 ft)
- Top floor: 182.93 m (600 ft)

Technical details
- Floor count: 54

Design and construction
- Architects: Andrey Molokov and Vladimir Grachev

Vysotsky (Russian: Высоцкий) is the name of a skyscraper in Yekaterinburg. It is the third-tallest building in Russia outside of Moscow.

== History ==
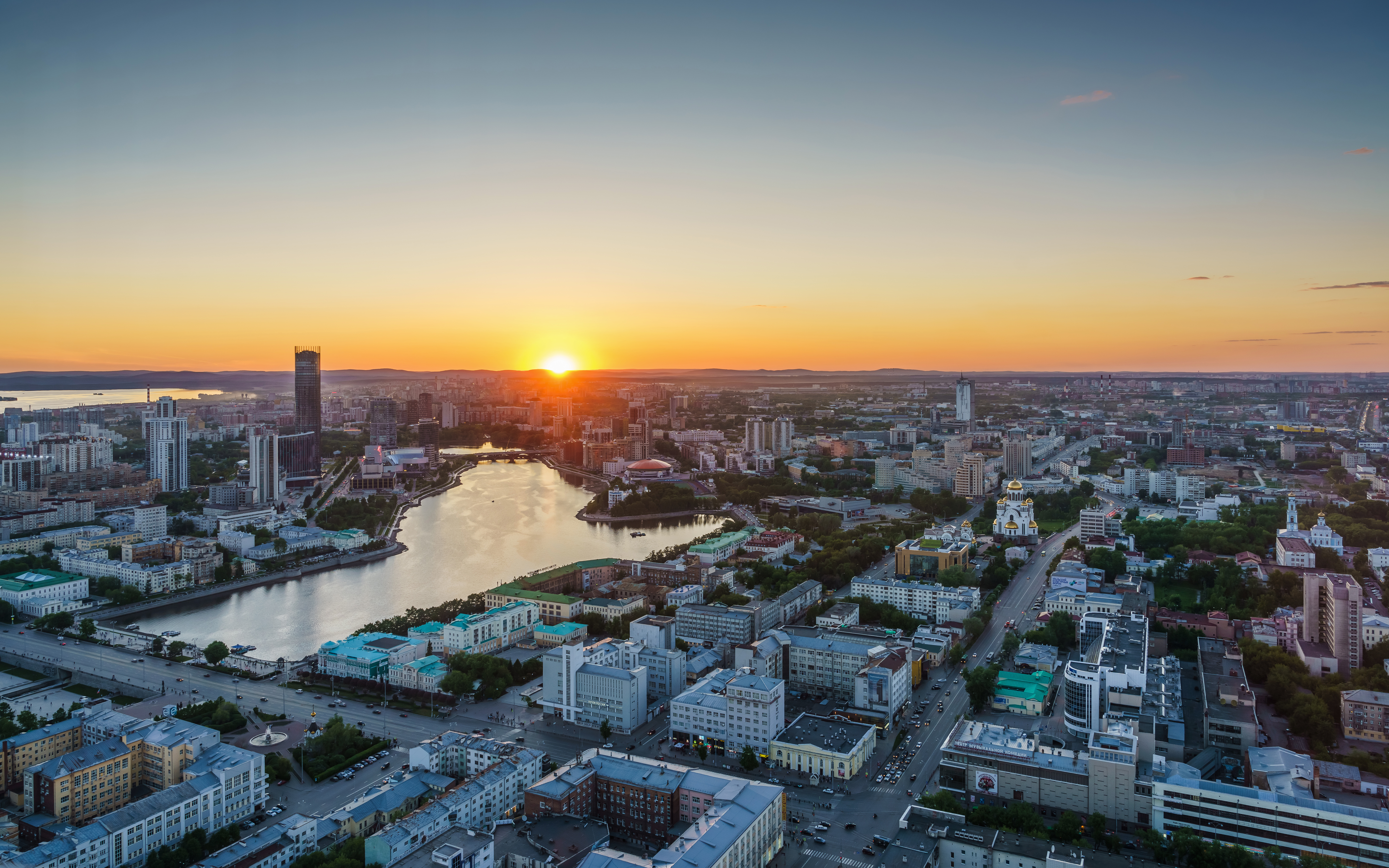
View of the city from the observation deck

Vysotsky architecture business center and semi-skyscraper was built in 2011. It has 54 floors, total height: 188.3 m (618 ft). The business center Vysotsky hit the Guinness Book of Records, having become "The tallest multifunctional business center in the Ural-Siberian and Central-Asian regions."

The architects are Andrey Molokov and Vladimir Grachev.

An open sightseeing platform on the 52nd floor at the height of 186 metres (610 ft) offers a panoramic view of the city. The building serves as a helpful landmark and orientation point when lost in the city's wide parameter.

The business center Vysotsky is named after Vladimir Vysotsky, a Soviet poet, musician, and actor. Also, it is a play on words: vysoky means "tall" in Russian. Behind the building is a bronze sculpture of Vladimir Vysotsky and his third wife, the French actress Marina Vlady.

== See also ==
- List of tallest buildings in Russia
