= SPEECH architectural office =

Russian architectural practice

SPEECH

Practice information
- Key architects: Sergei Tchoban
- Founded: 2006
- Location: Moscow

Website
- www.speech.su

SPEECH is a Russian architectural office. It was founded in 2006 by architects Sergei Tchoban and Sergey Kuznetsov. The bureau specializes in designing buildings and complexes with various functional purposes, developing urban concepts, as well as designing interiors. Projects by SPEECH have been implemented in numerous cities in Russia (Moscow, Saint Petersburg, Sochi, Kazan, Nizhny Novgorod, and others) as well as abroad (Berlin, Milan, Venice, Minsk).

== History ==
The SPEECH architectural office was formed in 2006 as a joint project of the architects Sergei Tchoban and Sergey Kuznetsov through the merger of two companies – Tchoban and Partners and S. P. Project. Initially the bureau was called SPEECH Tchoban / Kuznetsov, but after Sergey Kuznetsov was appointed Chief Architect of Moscow in 2012 and left the company, Sergei Tchoban became the sole architect and managing partner, and the name of the bureau was shortened to SPEECH.

== Main buildings ==
- 2011 – Granatny 6 residential complex, Moscow.
- 2011 – Palace of Water Sports for the 2013 Universiade in Kazan.
- 2012 – Aquamarine office and business complex on Ozerkovskaya embankment in Moscow.
- 2014 – “V lesu” microcity, Pyatnitskoe highway, Moscow region.
- 2015 – Russian pavilion at Expo 2015 in Milan
- 2015 – VTB Ice Palace, Moscow.

== Projects in progress ==
- Facades of the new museum complex of the State Tretyakov Gallery, Moscow
- Museum and Educational Center of the Polytechnic Museum and the Lomonosov Moscow State University (together with the bureau Massimiliano Fuksas Architetto)

== Urban planning projects ==
SPEECH architectural office has extensive experience in the development of architectural and urban planning concepts and design projects.

== Exhibition and educational activities ==
Projects by SPEECH have been featured at exhibition venues.

For four consecutive years starting with 2012, SPEECH participated in the INTERNI exhibition in Milan. It presented there the installations: The Eye of the Architect (2012), Golden River (2013), U_cloud (2014), and Living Line (2015).

== Professional awards ==
Buildings and complexes built according to designs by SPEECH bureau have won numerous national and international professional awards.

- In 2015, the building of the Museum for Architectural Drawing (Berlin, Germany) was awarded the 3d prize of The German Annual award, Heinze Architekten AWARD 2015 and received the status of Winner of the category Architecture and Urban Space of German Design Award.
