= Eurasia (skyscraper) =

308.9 meters (1,013 ft) supertall skyscraper located on plot 12 MIBC in Moscow, Russia

- Евразия
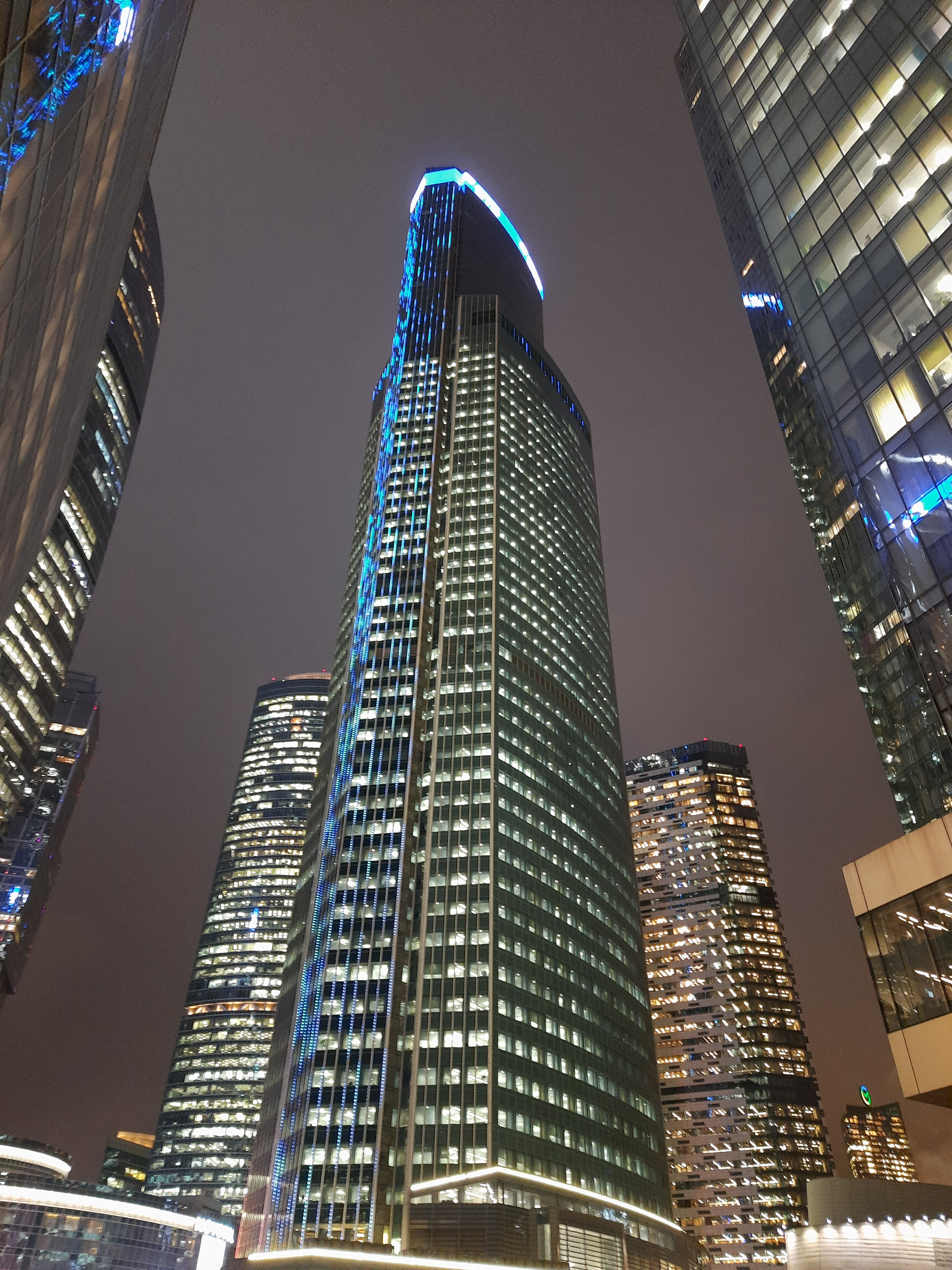
- Interactive map of the Eurasia area
- Alternative names: Steel Peak

General information
- Status: Completed
- Type: Mixed-use
- Location: Moscow City, Moscow, Russia
- Coordinates: 55°44′57″N 37°32′05″E
- Construction started: 2 December 2006
- Completed: 14 December 2014
- Owner: VTB Bank

Height
- Architectural: 308.9 m (1,013 ft)
- Tip: 308.9 m (1,013 ft)
- Top floor: 292.5 m (960 ft)
- Observatory: 306.9 m (1,007 ft)

Technical details
- Floor count: 72
- Floor area: 212,900 m^{2} (2,292,000 sq ft)

Design and construction
- Architect: Swanke Hayden Connell Architects
- Structural engineer: Thornton Tomasetti

Eurasia (Russian: Евразия, romanized: Yevraziya), also known as Steel Peak (Russian: Стальная Вершина, romanized: Stalnaya Vershina), is a 308.9 m (1,013 ft) supertall skyscraper located on plot 12 of the MIBC in Moscow, Russia. The mixed-use skyscraper occupies a total area of 207,542 square metres (2,233,960 sq ft), and houses offices, apartments, a hotel, and a fitness center. It is the sixth-tallest building in Russia, the eighth-tallest building in Europe, and the 72nd-tallest building in the world. Construction of Eurasia started in 2006 and was completed in 2014.

== History ==
The concept of Eurasia was first proposed in 2003. Construction started in 2006 and was completed in 2014.

== Design ==
According to Swanke Hayden Connell Architects, the architectural skin of Eurasia reinforces the purity of the tower volume over the complexity of the program within. The unitized curtain wall allows the transition from the office floors of fixed windows to operable windows on the residential floors. The overall architectural form is developed as a pure glass, curving, curtain wall tower with its broad faces versus its tripartite ends sitting on a multi-volume podium.

Eurasia was the first composite structure to be constructed in Russia utilizing a reinforced concrete core with a perimeter frame of steel. The structural design allows for column-free interior spaces ideal for offices which make up a significant portion of the building’s programming. The building features a bowed exterior made up of closely spaced steel columns which sit upon a belt truss serving as a load transfer for the base of the tower to feature an open lobby on the ground floor.

=== Features ===
The building is designed as a two-tier skyscraper: 30 floors in the first tier and 37 in the second one. Offices occupy from the 4th floor to the 45th floor while apartments occupy from the 48th floor to the 66th floor. The 47th floor is occupied by a fitness center and the second floor of the building is occupied by a casino. A swimming pool is located on the 50th floor.

== Management ==
The building is developed by CJSC Techinvest and MOS City Group. The company LLC Plaza owns Eurasia. On 12 April 2016, VB-service, a subsidiary of VTB Bank, acquired a 99.55% stake in LLC Plaza at a price estimated at 48.5 billion rubles. The transaction was carried out within the framework of the fulfillment of credit obligations by Coulteria to the Bank of Moscow. Head offices of VTB 24 and the Bank of Moscow are planned to occupy the tower.

== Construction gallery ==
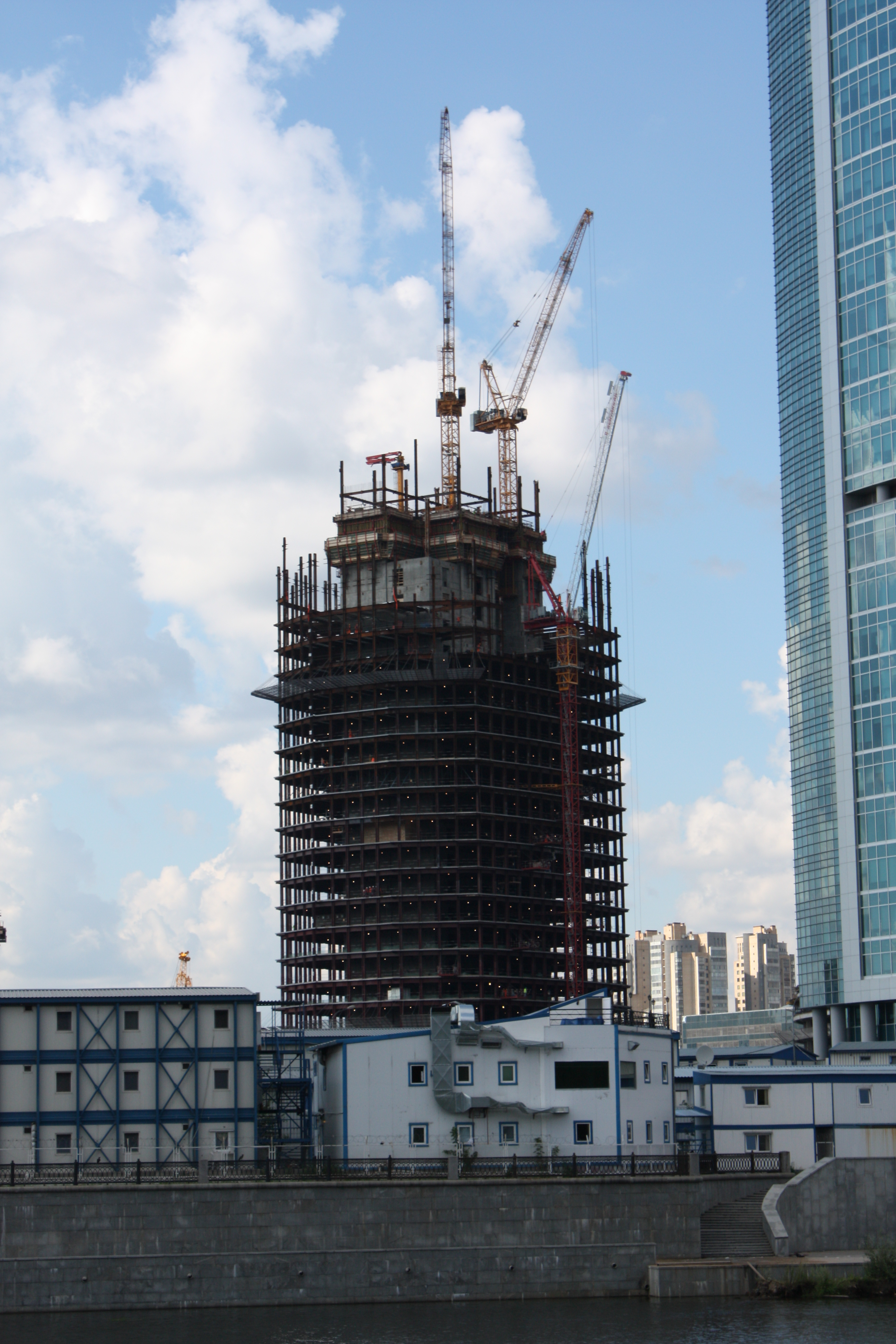
21 July 2008

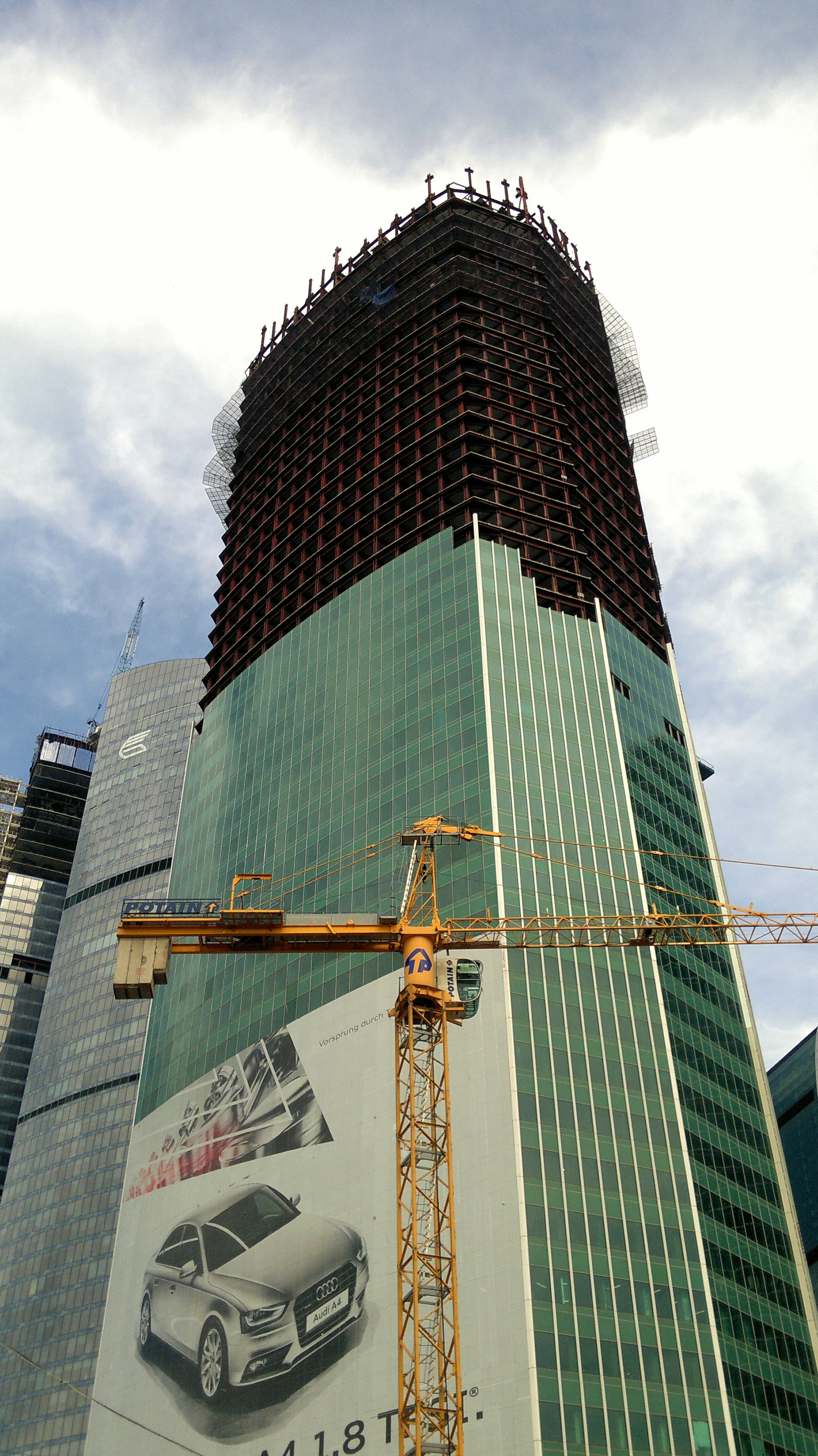
12 May 2012

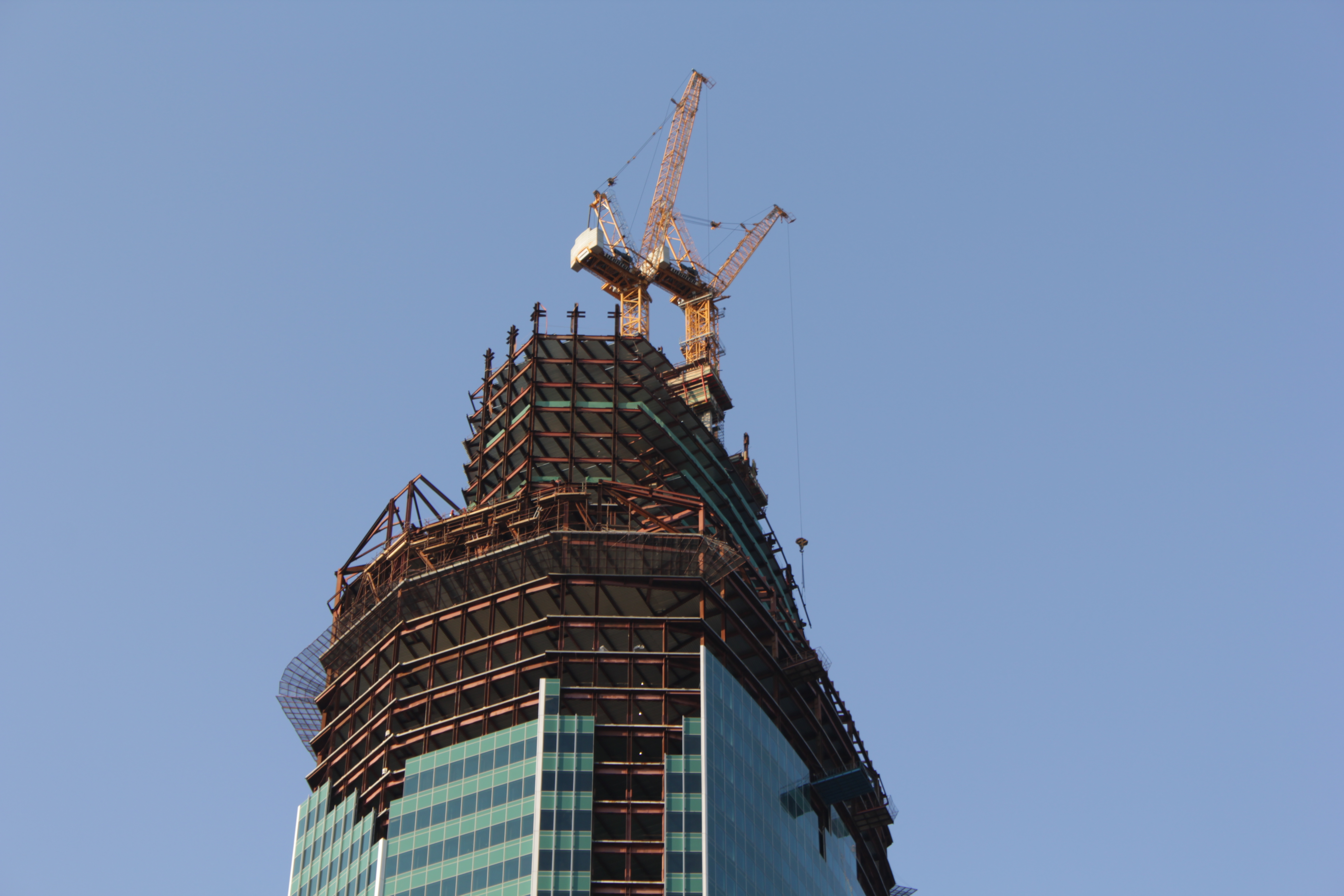
12 September 2012

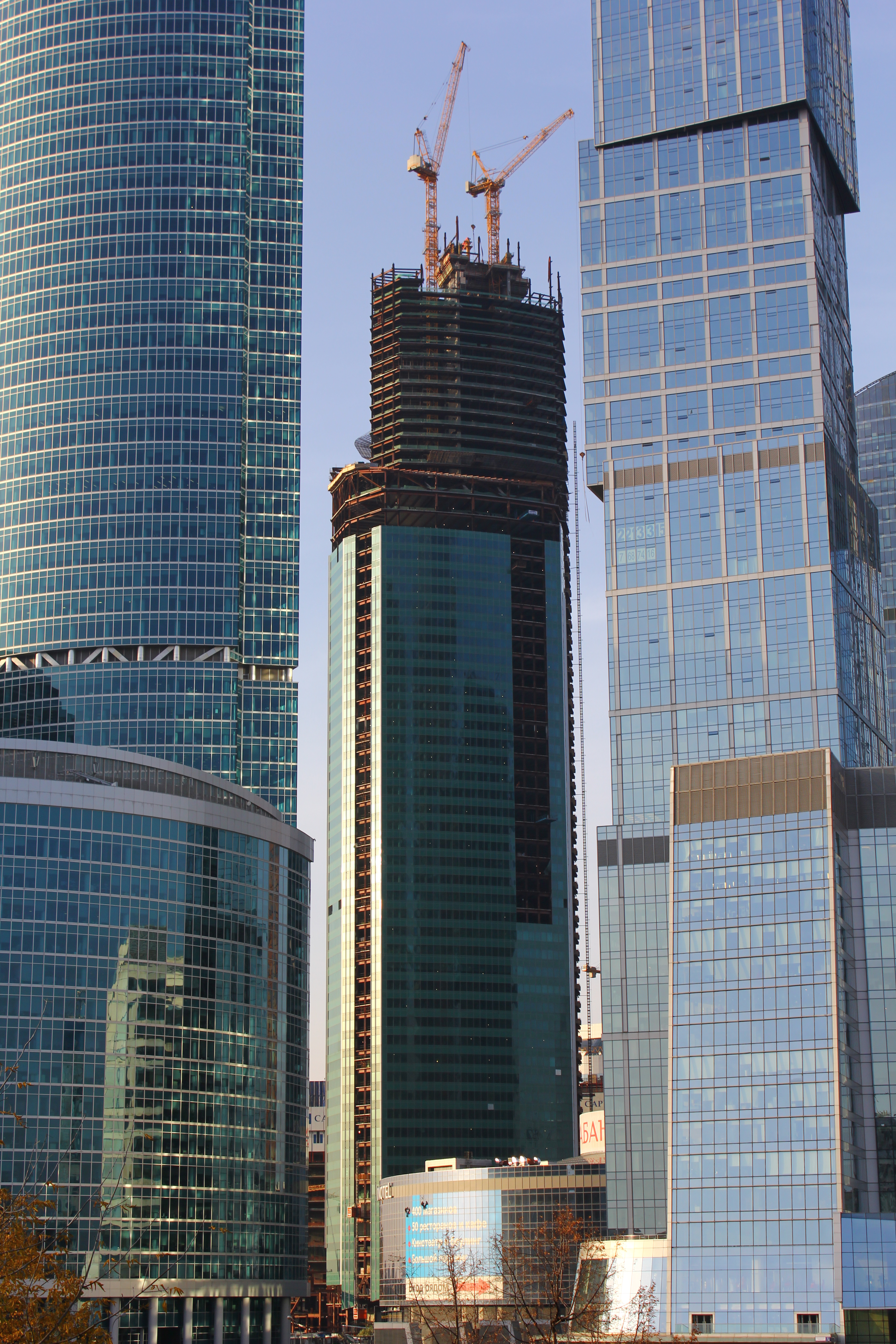
20 October 2012

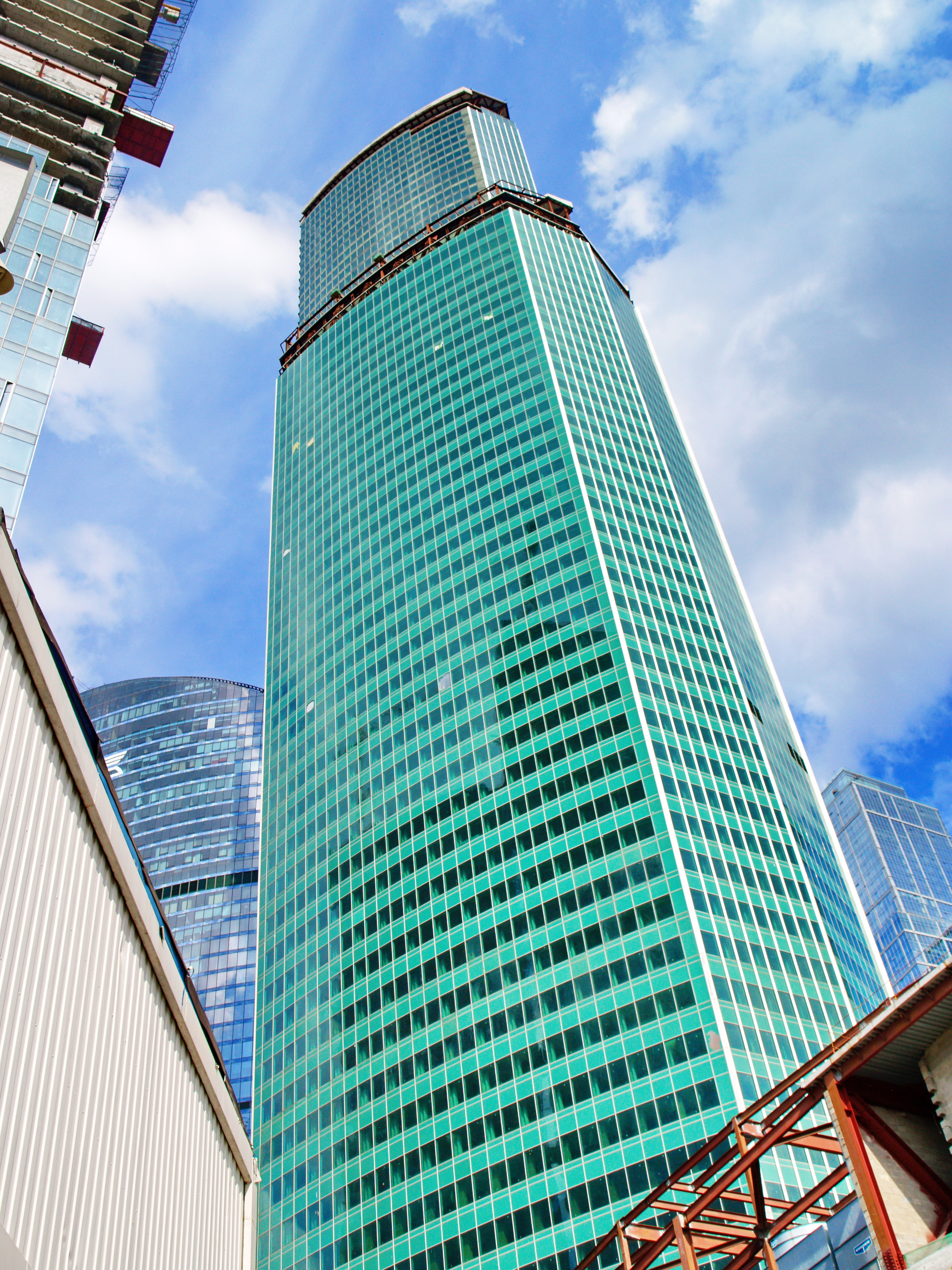
13 July 2013

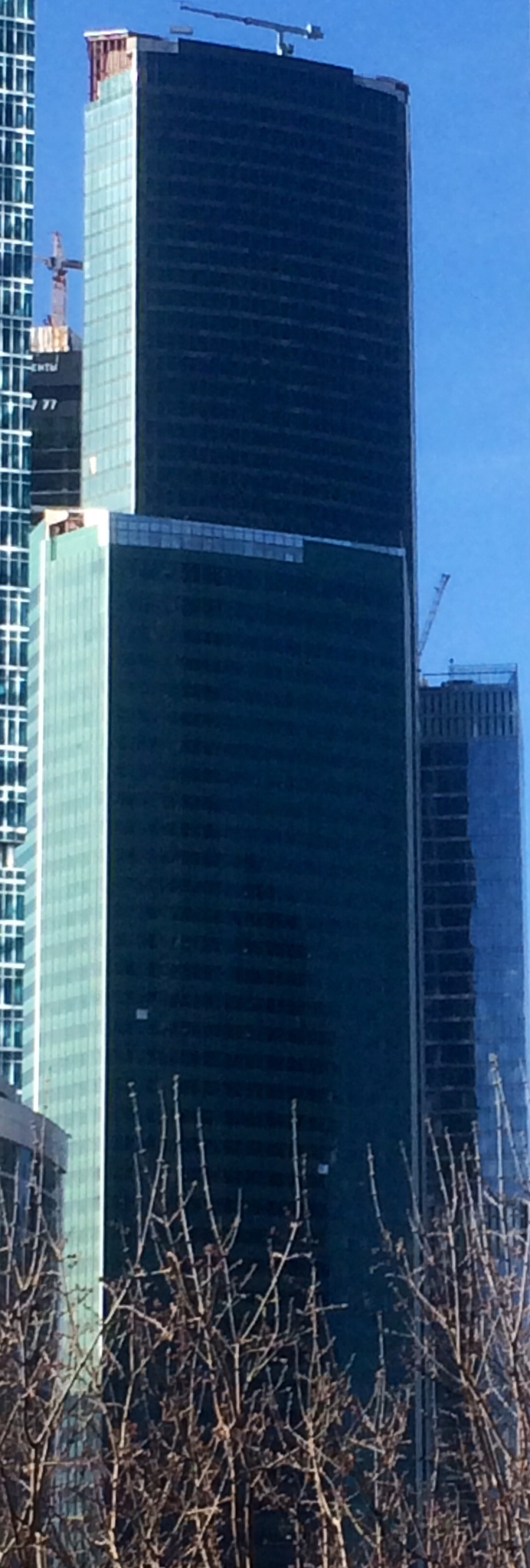
26 March 2014

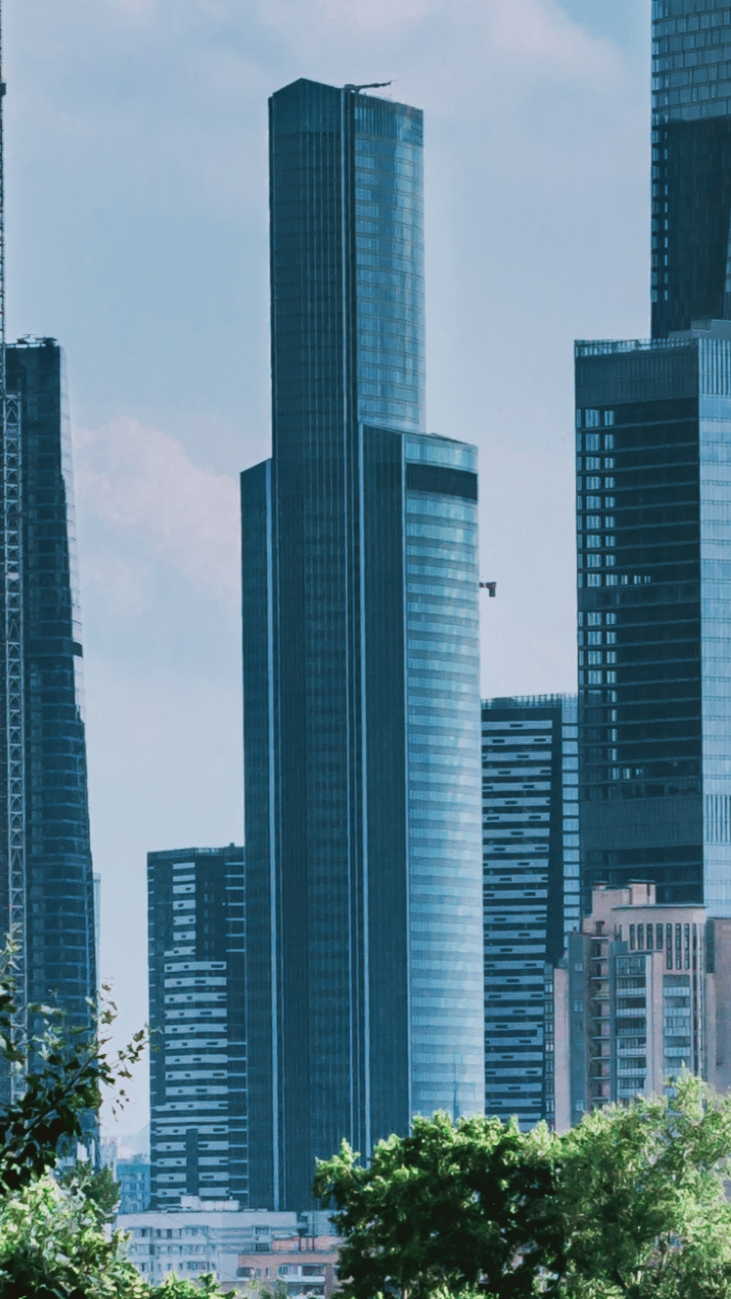
3 September 2016

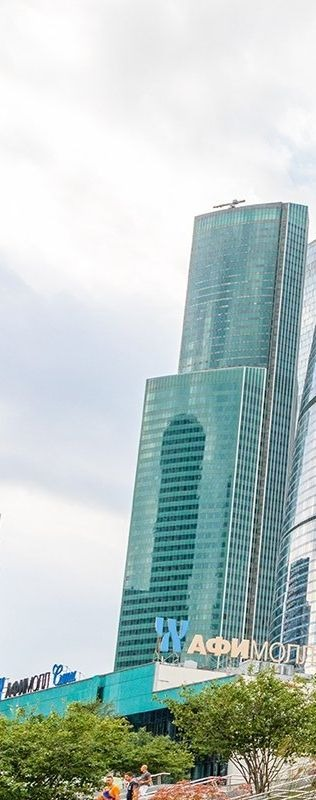
4 September 2019

== Awards ==
- The Eurasia Tower is the second Swanke-designed building rated by Emporis.
- It also rated by Turkish banking company Is Bankasi as among the top ten innovative and imposing designs of notable bank buildings around the world. This in turn led Swanke to meet up with its Turkish manager and associate architect Summa International Construction Inc.

== See also ==
- List of tallest buildings in Russia
- List of tallest buildings in Europe
