= OKO =

Complex of two skyscrapers in Moscow, Russia

- ОКО
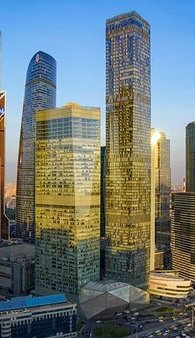

General information
- Status: Completed
- Type: Mixed-use
- Architectural style: Postmodernism
- Location: Moscow International Business Center; Moscow, Russia
- Coordinates: 55°44′58.48″N 37°32′3.69″E
- Construction started: 2011
- Completed: 2015 (North and South Tower); 2017 (Parking)
- Cost: US$1-1.2 billion
- Owner: Capital Group

Height
- Roof: 354.1 m (South Tower); 245 m (North Tower); 44 m (Parking)

Technical details
- Floor count: 85 (South Tower); 49 (North Tower); 12 (Parking)
- Floor area: 249,600 m^{2} (2,687,000 sq ft)

Design and construction
- Architect: Skidmore, Owings and Merrill
- Developer: Capital Group
- Structural engineer: Skidmore, Owings and Merrill

OKO (Russian: ОКО, obsolete Russian word for eye, also an abbreviation for Ob'yedinonnyye Kristallom Osnovaniya (Russian: Oбъединённые Кристаллом Oснования, literal meaning Foundations Bound by a Crystal)) is a complex of two skyscrapers located on plot 16 in the Moscow International Business Center (MIBC) in Moscow, Russia. Occupying a total area of about 250,000 square metres (2,700,000 ft^{2}), the mixed-use complex houses apartments, office space, a 5-star hotel, and other commodities.

The two skyscrapers, North Tower and South Tower, are among the tallest skyscrapers in Russia, with the latter being the taller of the two. Rising 354.1 m (1,162 ft), the 85-story South Tower, also known as the OKO Apartment Tower or 16a IBC Tower 1, was the tallest building in Russia and Europe when constructed, until it was surpassed by Federation Tower a few months later. The 49-story North Tower, also known as the OKO Office Tower or 16a IBC Tower 2, is 245 m (804 ft) tall and the 11th tallest building in Russia. The complex also has a large car park, rising 12 stories with a height of 44 m (144 ft).

== History ==
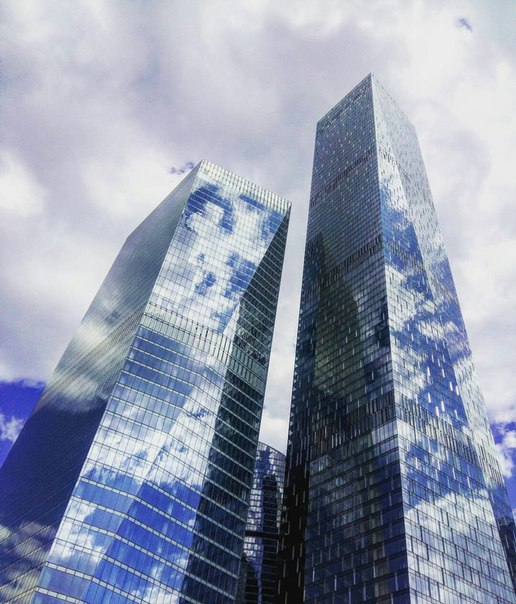
The OKO complex from the ground

Construction of the OKO complex started in 2011.

In the summer of 2014, the South Tower of the OKO complex surpassed the height of the neighboring Mercury City Tower (also in the MIBC) as the tallest building in Russia and Europe, only to be surpassed by the neighboring Vostok/East Tower of the Federation Towers (also in the MIBC) in November 2014, only a few months later. It was also during this period the OKO was the tallest building made of reinforced concrete.

On 28 November 2015, the OKO complex was completed and put into operation.

On 27 July 2016, the Government of Moscow purchased from the owner of OKO, Capital Group, 55,000 m^{2} of space in one of the towers of the OKO complex at a cost estimated at 14.3 billion rubles.

On 16 December 2016, the tallest skating rink in Europe opened on the roof of the South Tower of the OKO complex at a height of 354 m (1,161 ft).

On 30 July 2023, a drone explosion damaged the OKO-2 and IQ-quarter buildings and broke multiple windows, injuring 1.

== Design ==
=== Overview ===
The facades of the complex are connected with diagonal folds and are linked by a faceted base, giving a noticeable shard effect that defines the towers' appearance. In addition, the towers' canted folds allow each other to recede from one another as they rise. The complex forms an L-shaped composition at the ground plane that is pulled to perimeter of the site. This placement and the facade folds both allow the building to lean over the nearby Third Ring Road. A landscaped plaza sits at the base of the buildings and creates a sheltered, private garden that guides occupants to separate lobbies, in addition to give public space to pedestrians to rest. The building’s all-glass facade offers several features that benefit its occupants. Ventilated mullions can be opened manually to allow natural air flow into the interior. These mullions also help to mitigate stack effect. These features also allow the complex to give out a dynamic and shifting exterior.

In addition, the 28th and 49th floors of the North Tower and the 7th, 27th, 46th, 65th and 83rd floors of the South Tower have entresol, so it can be counted 51 and 90 floors in those buildings accordingly.

=== Features ===
The South Tower is used as a residential building and a hotel. The building also has a skating rink on its roof, the tallest in Europe at a height of 354 m (1,161 ft). The North Tower is used as an office. The complex also has a restaurant and a fitness center.

== Construction gallery ==
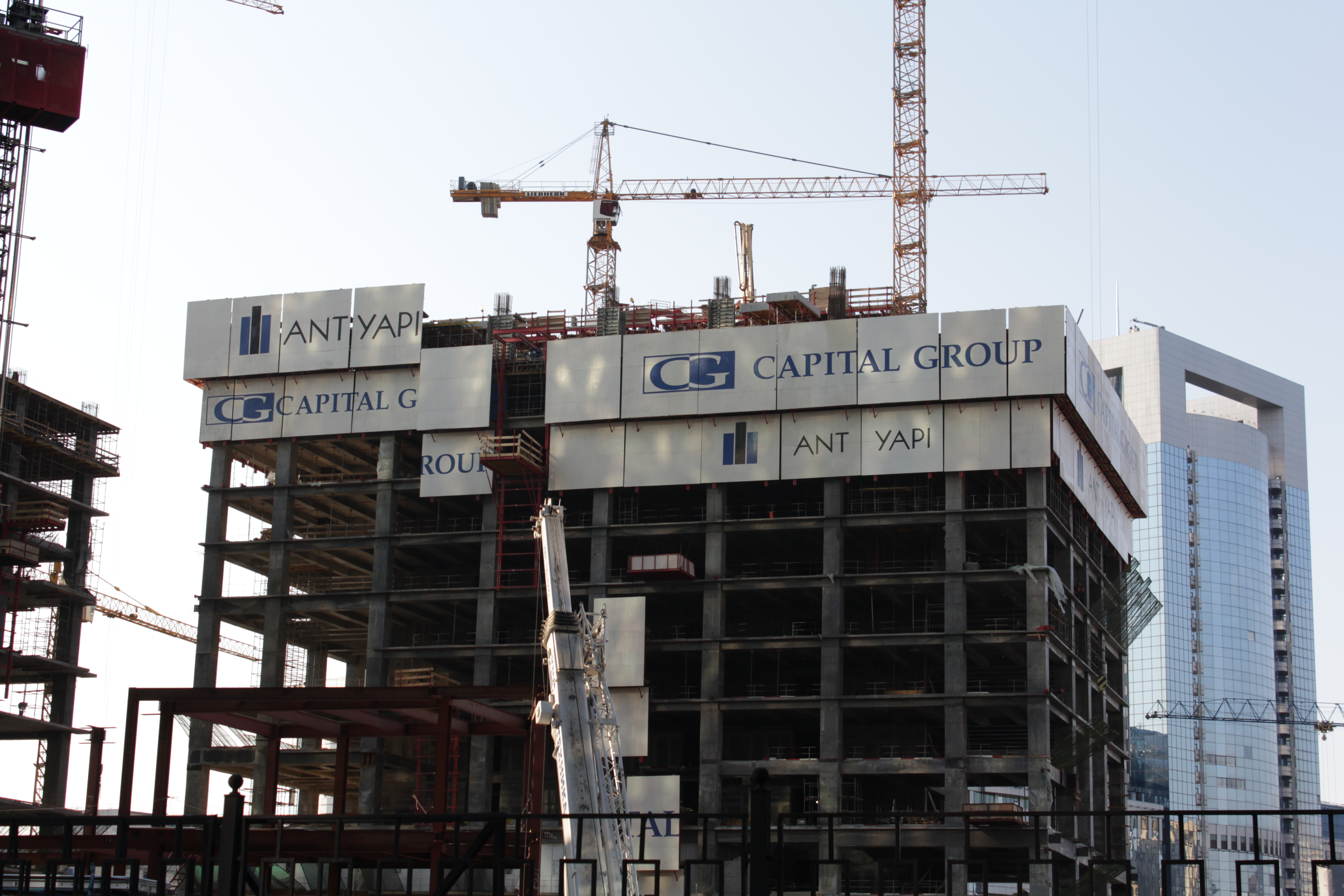
North Tower on 12 September 2012

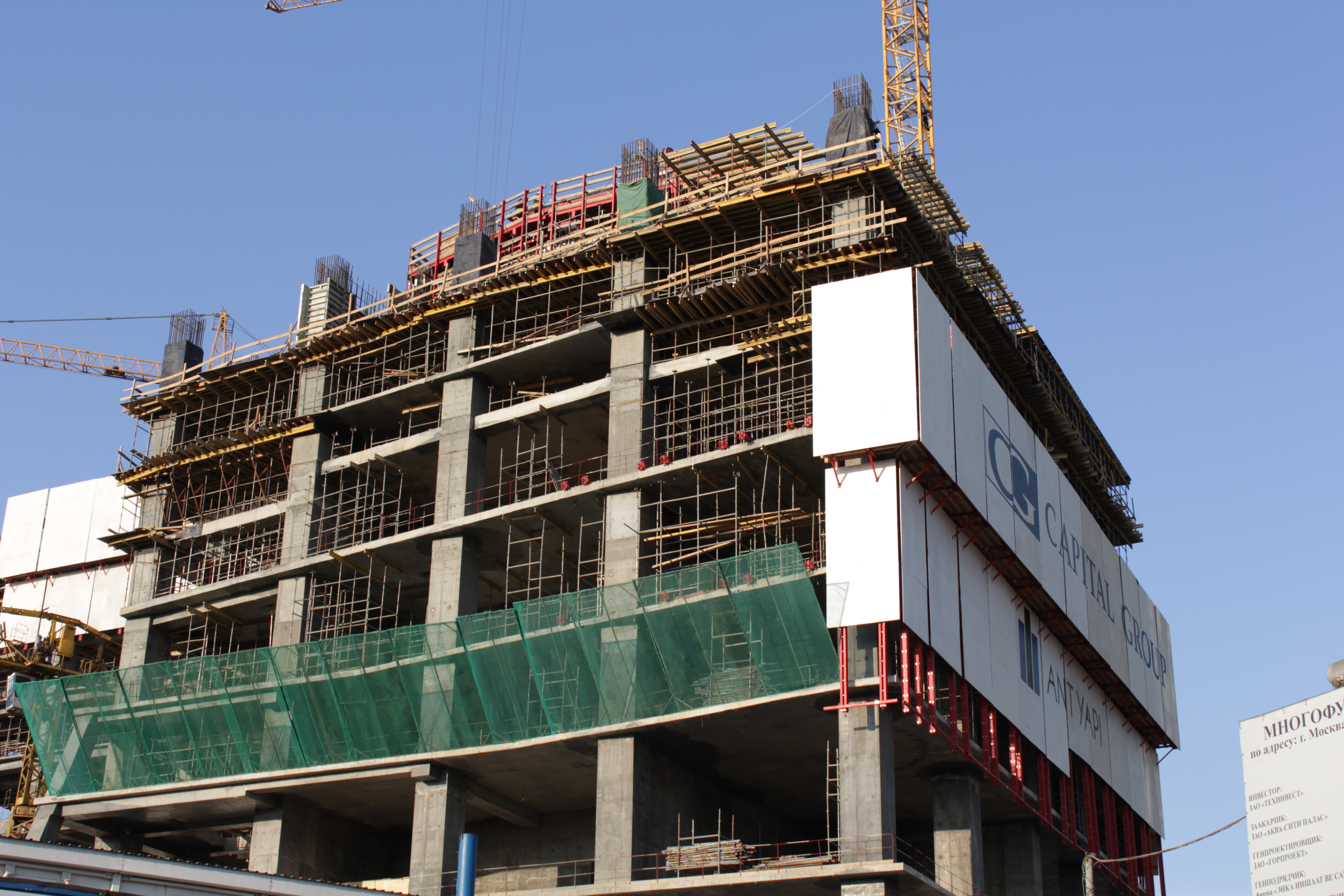
South Tower on 12 September 2012

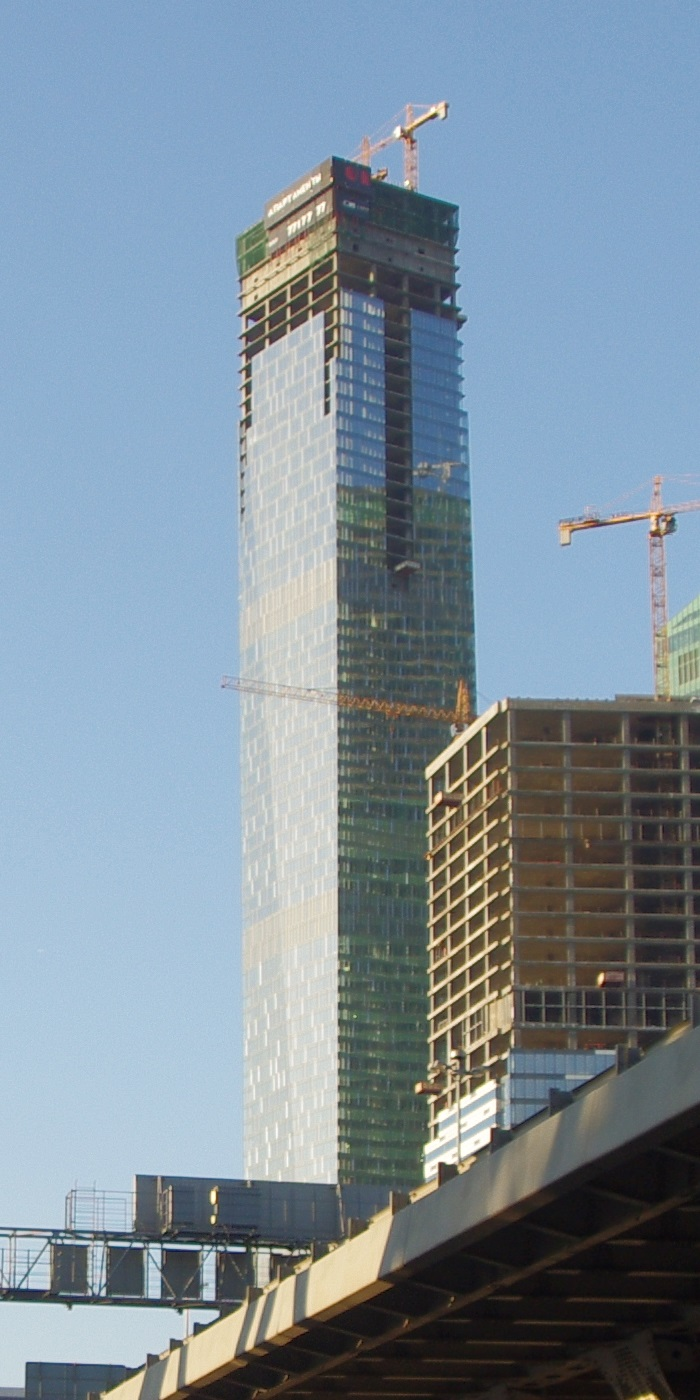
2 November 2014

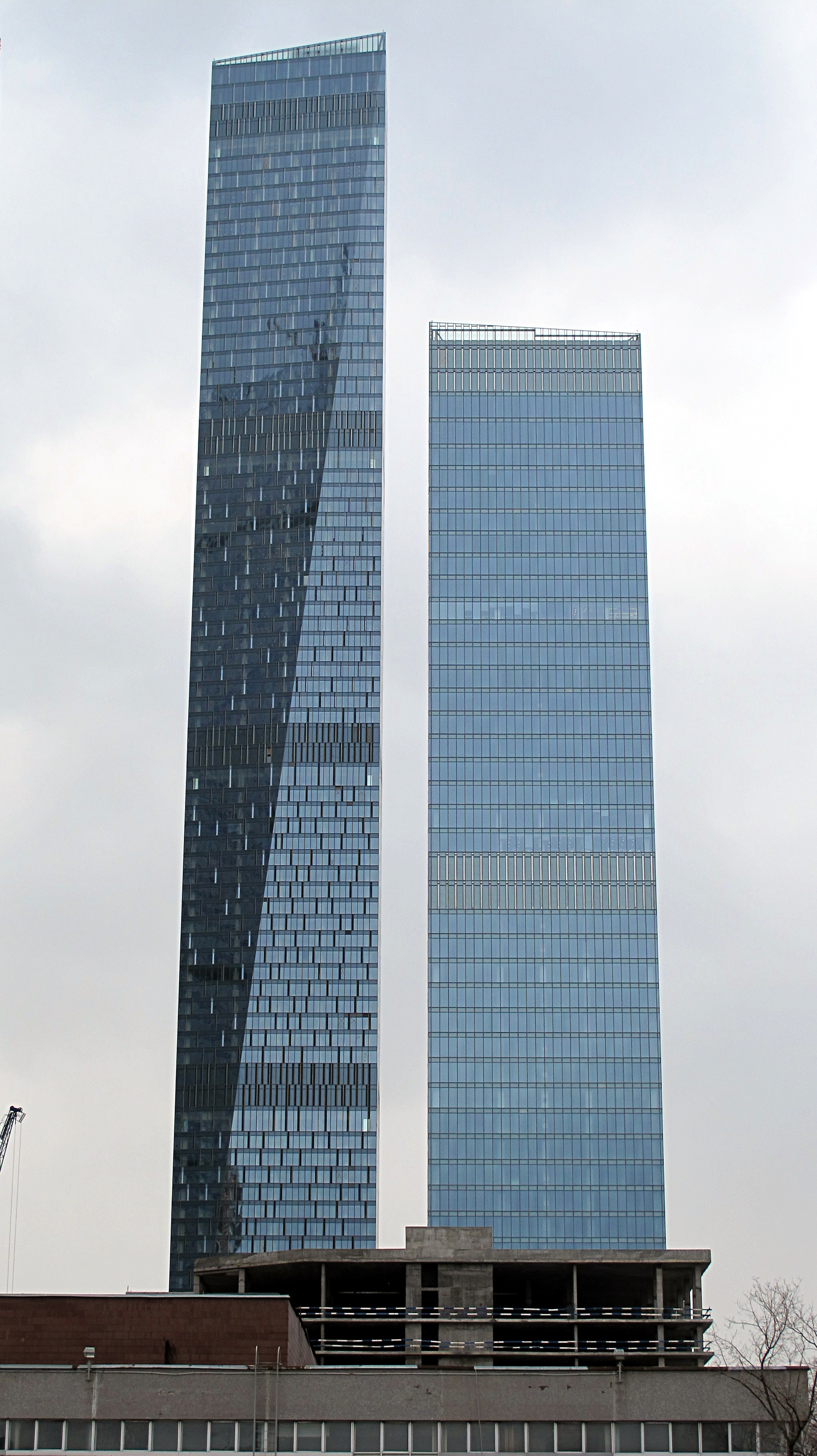
22 March 2016

== See also ==
- OKO Tower
- Mercury City Tower
- Imperia Tower
- Eurasia (building)
- List of tallest buildings in Russia

Records
Preceded by Mercury City Tower	Europe’s tallest building 2014	Succeeded by Federation Tower (East Tower)
Preceded by Mercury City Tower	Russia’s tallest building 2014	Succeeded by Federation Tower (East Tower)
Preceded by Mercury City Tower	Tallest building in Moscow; 2014	Succeeded by Federation Tower (East Tower)
