= Northern Tower =

Building in Moscow, Russia

- Северная Башня
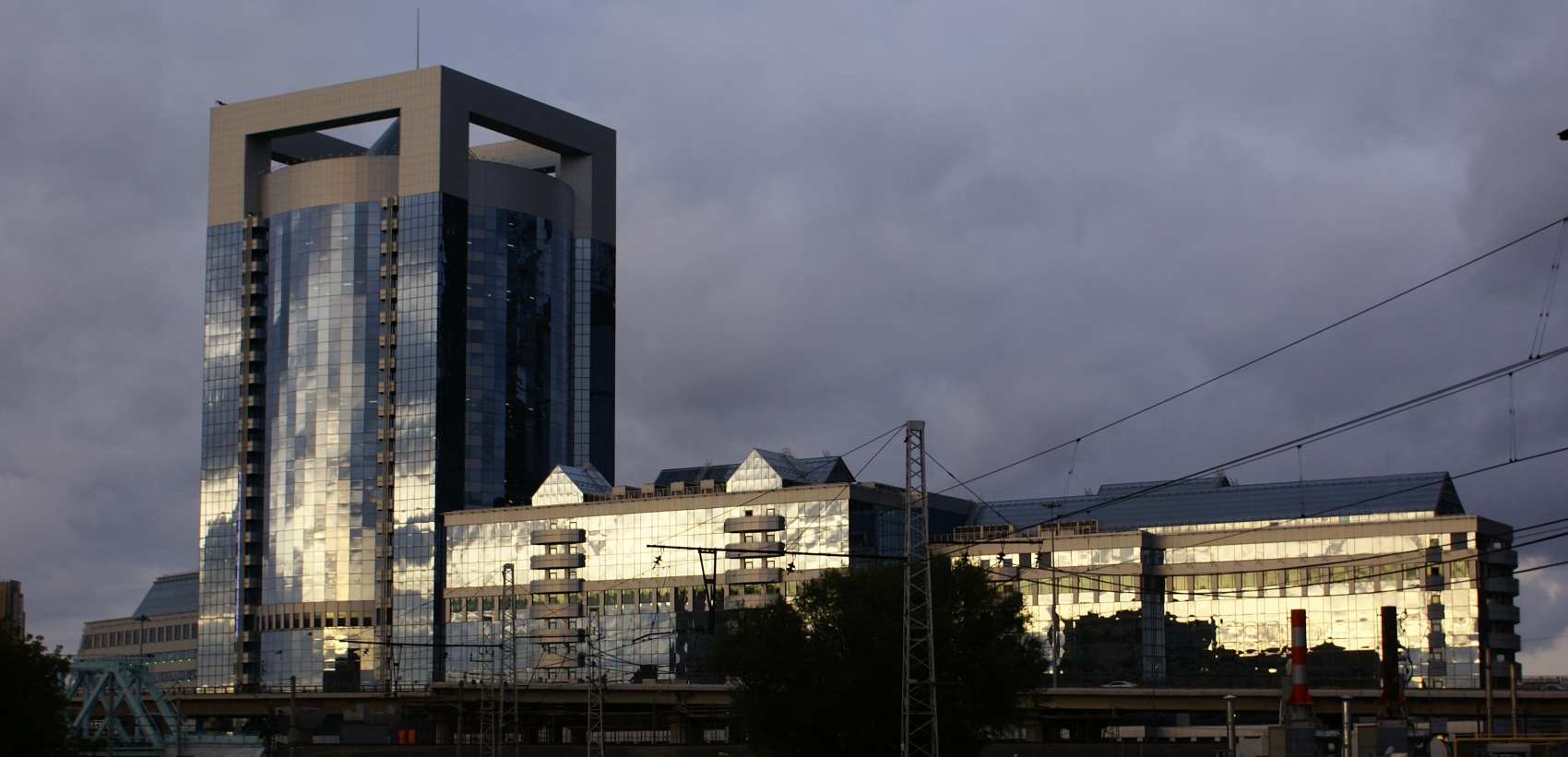

- Location within Moscow

General information
- Status: Completed
- Type: Restaurant; Office; Apartments
- Architectural style: Postmodernism
- Location: Moscow-City, Moscow, Russia, 10 Testovskaya Street
- Coordinates: 55.7519°N 37.5327°E
- Construction started: 2005
- Completed: 2008

Height
- Antenna spire: 131.8 m (432 ft)
- Roof: 108 m (354 ft)

Technical details
- Floor count: 27
- Floor area: 135,000 m^{2} (1,450,000 sq ft)

The Northern Tower is a building in Moscow, located on plot 19 of the Moscow International Business Center. The Northern Tower was built by Strabag, with construction starting in 2005 and finishing in 2008.

The height of the building is 108 m, and the total floor area is 135,000 m^{2}. In the tower there are office suites, restaurants, cafes, a fitness centre and a parking lot.

Among the largest tenants of the building are Raiffeisenbank, Transtelekom, General Motors, Hyundai Motor, and Motorola.

== History ==
Construction of the tower began in 2005 and was completed in 2008, being constructed by Austrian construction company Strabag SE. The project was presented to the public at the Ararat Park Hyatt Hotel, with more than 150 people in attendance.

== Design ==
The tower is one of the lowest buildings in the district, with a rectangular shape and an 18-story atrium topped with a large dome. The tower is built in a postmodern style.

=== Features ===
The tower is 108 metres tall (131.8 m including the spire) taking up an area 135,000 square metres. It features 27 floors with 10 elevators.

== Gallery ==
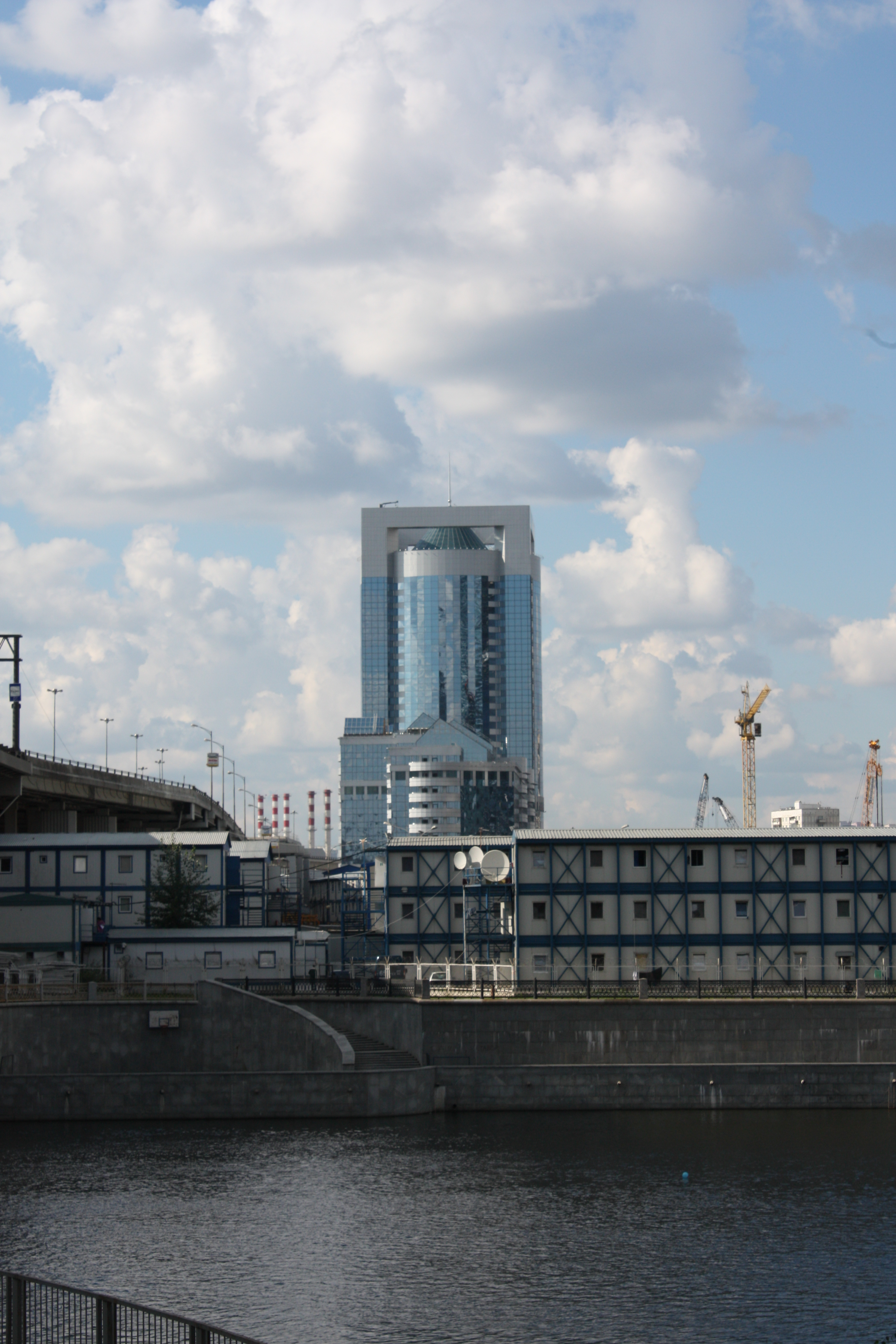
21 July 2008
