= Bagration Bridge =

Bridge in Moscow

Coordinates: 55°44′54″N 37°32′32″E

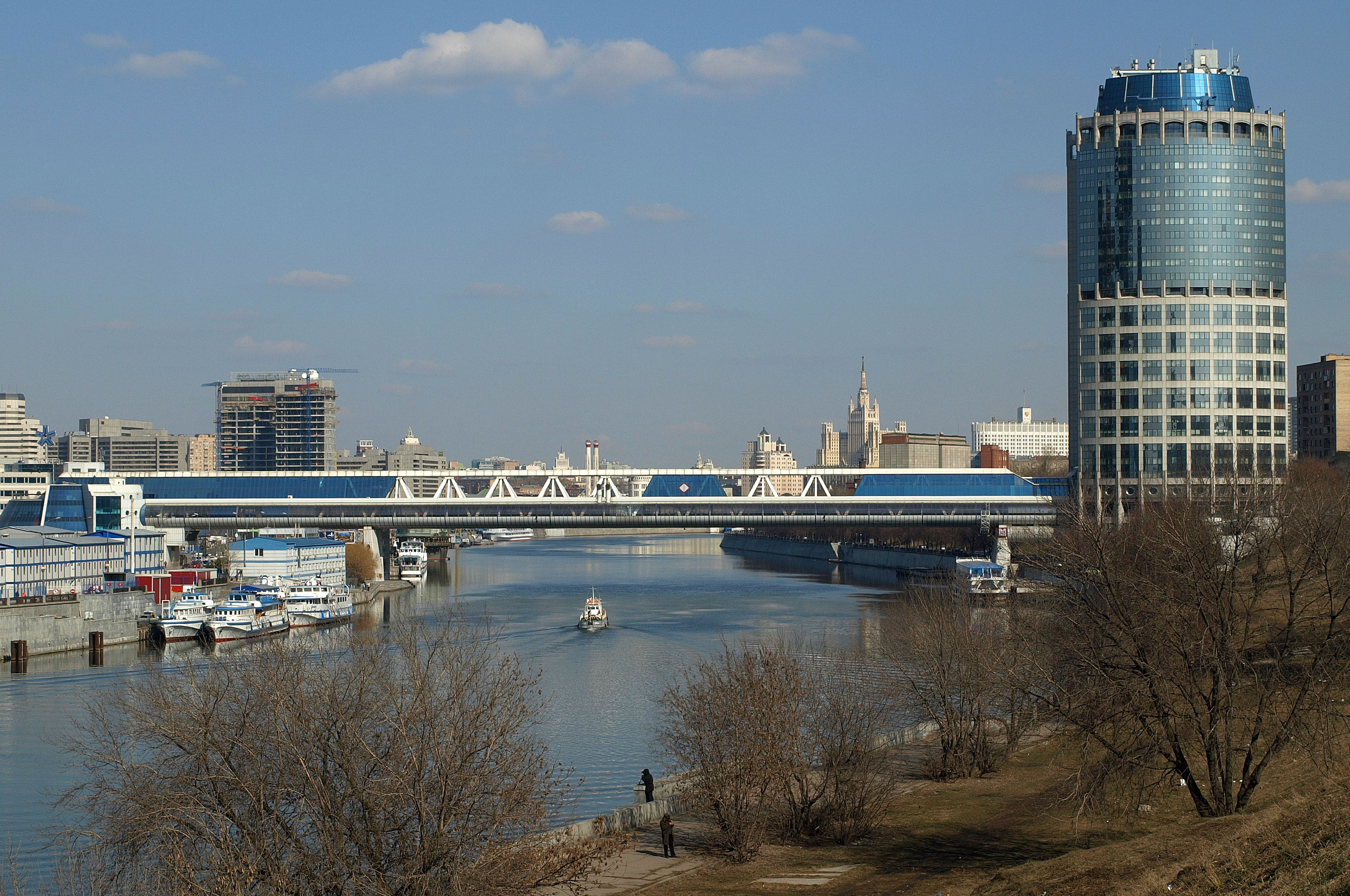
Bagration bridge

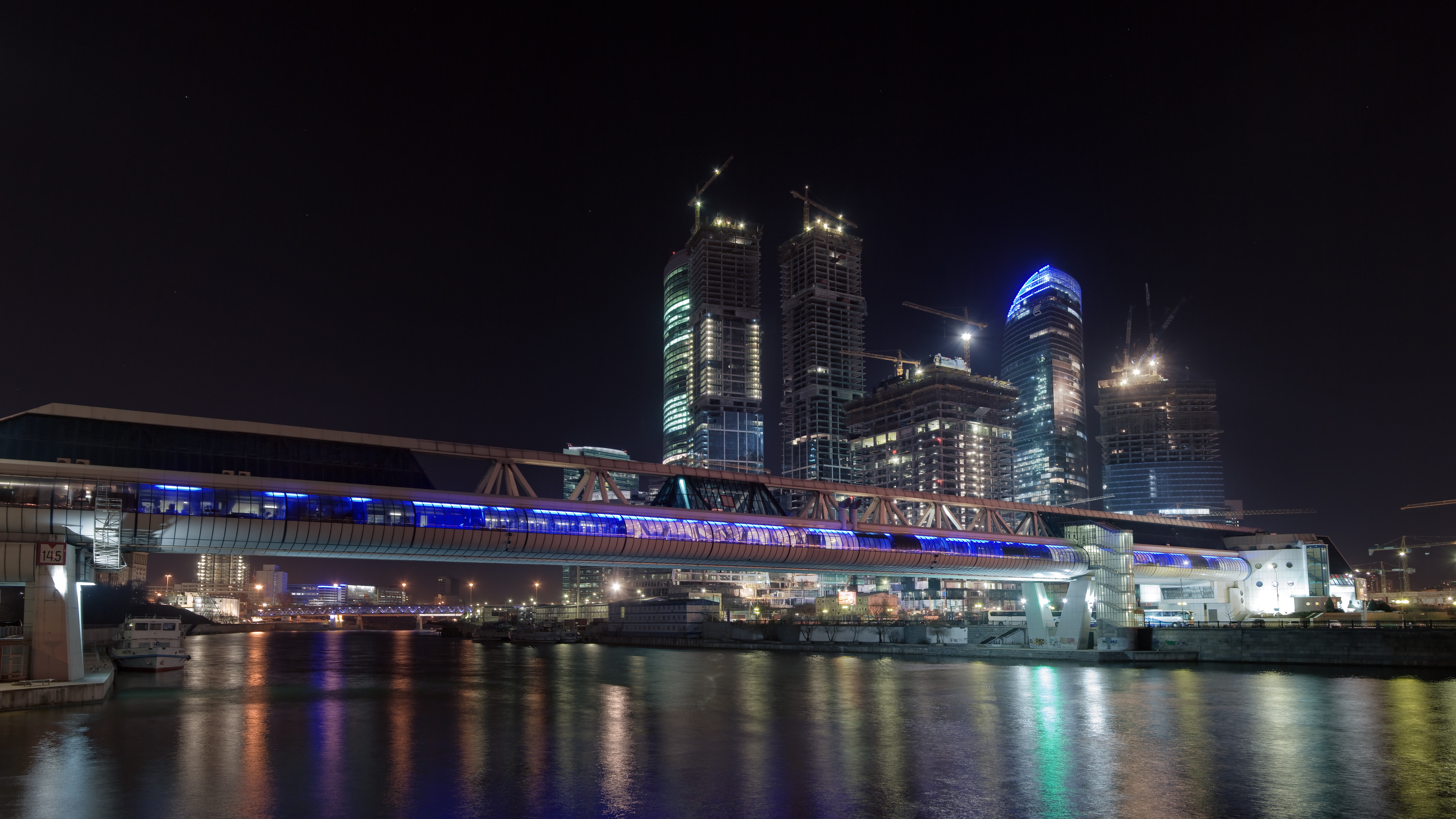
Bagration bridge at night

Bagration Bridge is a pedestrian bridge spanning the Moscow River in Moscow. It connects Tower 2000 to the main Moscow International Business Centre. The bridge was opened in September 1997 to celebrate Moscow's 850th anniversary of its founding. It is named after the Napoleonic wartime general Pyotr Bagration.

== Structure ==
Bagration Bridge has a length of 214 metres and a width of 16 metres. It stands 14 metres above the river. Supporting pillars in reinforced concrete, bearing structure made of steel. Lower gallery realised in curved compact polycarbonate sheet, double wall and aluminium profiles. Upper gallery in double wall glass. Realised in 1996 by Caoduro S.p.a. - Italy (Polycarbonate, aluminium and glass parts).

The bridge has two levels.

== See also ==
- List of bridges in Moscow
