= IQ-quarter =

Mixed-use complex in Moscow, Russia

- IQ-квартал
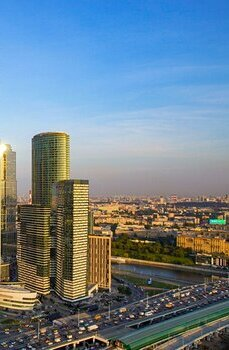
- Interactive map of the IQ-quarter area

General information
- Status: Completed
- Type: Mixed-use
- Location: Moscow-City, Moscow, Russia
- Coordinates: 55°44′59.17″N 37°32′13.70″E
- Construction started: 2008
- Completed: 2016

Height
- Roof: Tower 1: 85 m Tower 2: 135 m Tower 3: 169 m

Technical details
- Floor count: Tower 1: 22; Tower 2: 33; Tower 3: 42
- Floor area: 228,000 m^{2} (2,450,000 sq ft)

Design and construction
- Architect: NBBJ
- Main contractor: Ant Yapı Sanayi ve Ticaret A.Ş.

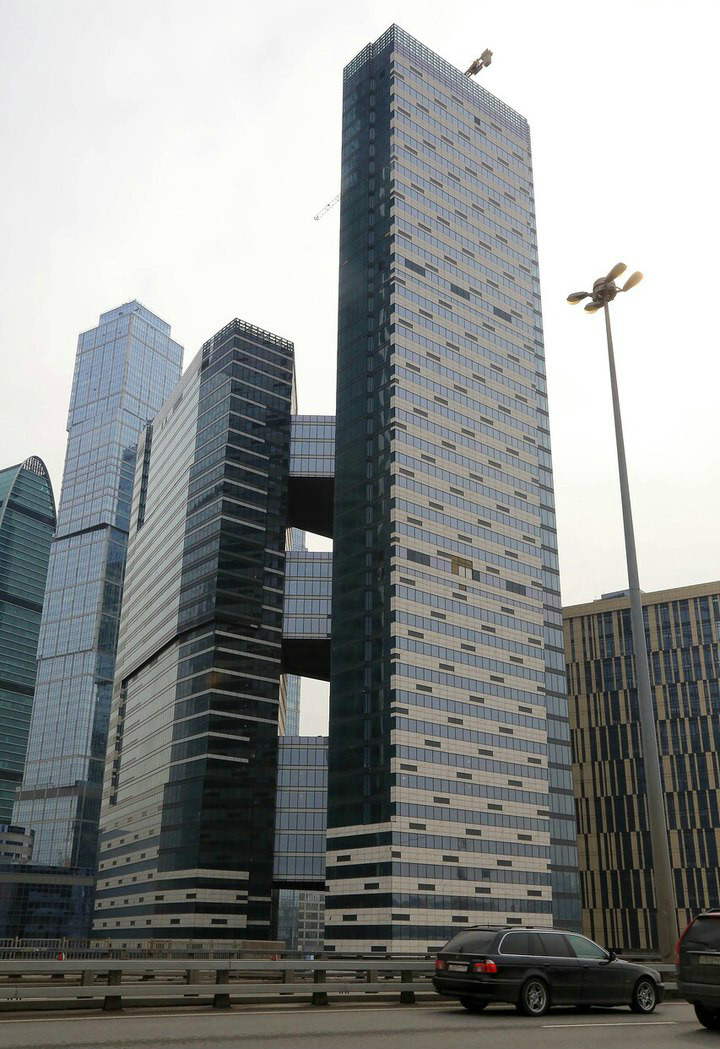
IQ-quarter building

The IQ-quarter (Russian: IQ-квартал, romanized: IQ-kvartal) is a mixed-use complex composed of two skyscrapers and a high-rise located on plot 11 in the Moscow International Business Center (MIBC) in Moscow, Russia with a total area of 201,430 m^{2} (2,168,174 ft^{2}). The skyscrapers are named Towers 1 and 2, with the latter being the tallest, and the high-rise just known as the IQ-quarter hotel or Tower 3. Construction of the complex began in 2008 and finished in 2016.

The 42-story Tower 2 is the tallest out of the three buildings in the complex, rising up to a height of 177.5 metres (582 ft). It is followed by the 33-story Tower 1, rising up to a height of 141 metres (463 ft). Both buildings serve as offices. The lowest building is the IQ-quarter hotel, or just Tower 3, standing at a height of 83.6 metres (274 ft) and serving as both a hotel and a residential area.

== History ==
The MIBC needed a transport terminal with commercial areas with a total area of 228,000 m^{2} (2,454,172 ft^{2}). Dutch company Citer Invest BV decided to invest in plot 11 of the MIBC back in 2003. Using 1,137 hectares, the company planned to build two office towers (122,450 m^{2} (1,318,041 ft^{2})) and a 4 star hotel with 390 rooms. The transport terminal was to be connected to Sheremetyevo International Airport, Vnukovo International Airport, the Moscow Metro, and ground transportation through the Third Ring Road. Construction of the complex started in 2008 and was planned to be completed in 2011.

In August 2008, the developer agreed with VTB Bank on project lending, but because of the Great Recession, the bank was unable to provide financing. As a result, construction was postponed in the first quarter of 2009. By this time, it was possible to erect only a wall in the ground and a pile foundation. Almost a year later, the company managed to raise $355 million with the help of Belgian financial institutions under the contracts issued by VTB. In November 2009, the developer expected that the complex would open in 2013.

In April 2011, the Russian construction company Hals-Development bought 50% plus one share of the project investor.

On 11 December 2014, the art piece Eye of Sauron was planned to be installed roof of the complex to go along with the Russian premiere of the film The Hobbit: The Battle of the Five Armies. This triggered an angry response by representatives of the Russian Orthodox Church.

The complex finished construction in 2016. In November, it became known that Russian banking company Rosselkhozbank is negotiating the purchase of a 34-story tower with a leasable area of 44,300 m^{2} (476,841 ft^{2}). The transaction value was estimated to be from 11.5 to 12 billion rubles.

== Government Complex ==
Beginning in 2019 the building started to house several Russian government ministries - Ministry of Economic Development, Ministry of Industry and Trade, Ministry of Digital Development, Communications and Mass Media.

As of 2023 the 42-story building houses among others several ministries and federal agencies:

- Ministry of Economic Development
  - Federal Accreditation Service
- Ministry of Industry and Trade
  - Federal Technical Regulation and Metrology Agency
- Ministry of Digital Development, Communications and Mass Media
- Federal Agency for Ethnic Affairs

== Drone attacks ==
On 30 July 2023, the building was damaged by a drone attack which the Russian Defense Ministry claims was carried out by Ukraine. Operations at Vnukovo Airport were briefly suspended and flights diverted. It was struck again the next day, this time on the 21st floor, and lost 150 square metres (1,600 sq ft) of glazing in a large explosion and the resultant fire. Flights were again diverted or suspended.

On 1 August 2023, the skyscraper was damaged for a second time by a drone attack which the Russian Defense Military claims was caused by them jamming the drone, causing it to crash into the building.

== See also ==
- List of tallest buildings in Moscow
- List of tallest buildings in Russia
- List of tallest buildings in Europe
- List of tallest structures in the former Soviet Union
