= Imperia Tower =

Building complex in Moscow, Russia

- Империя
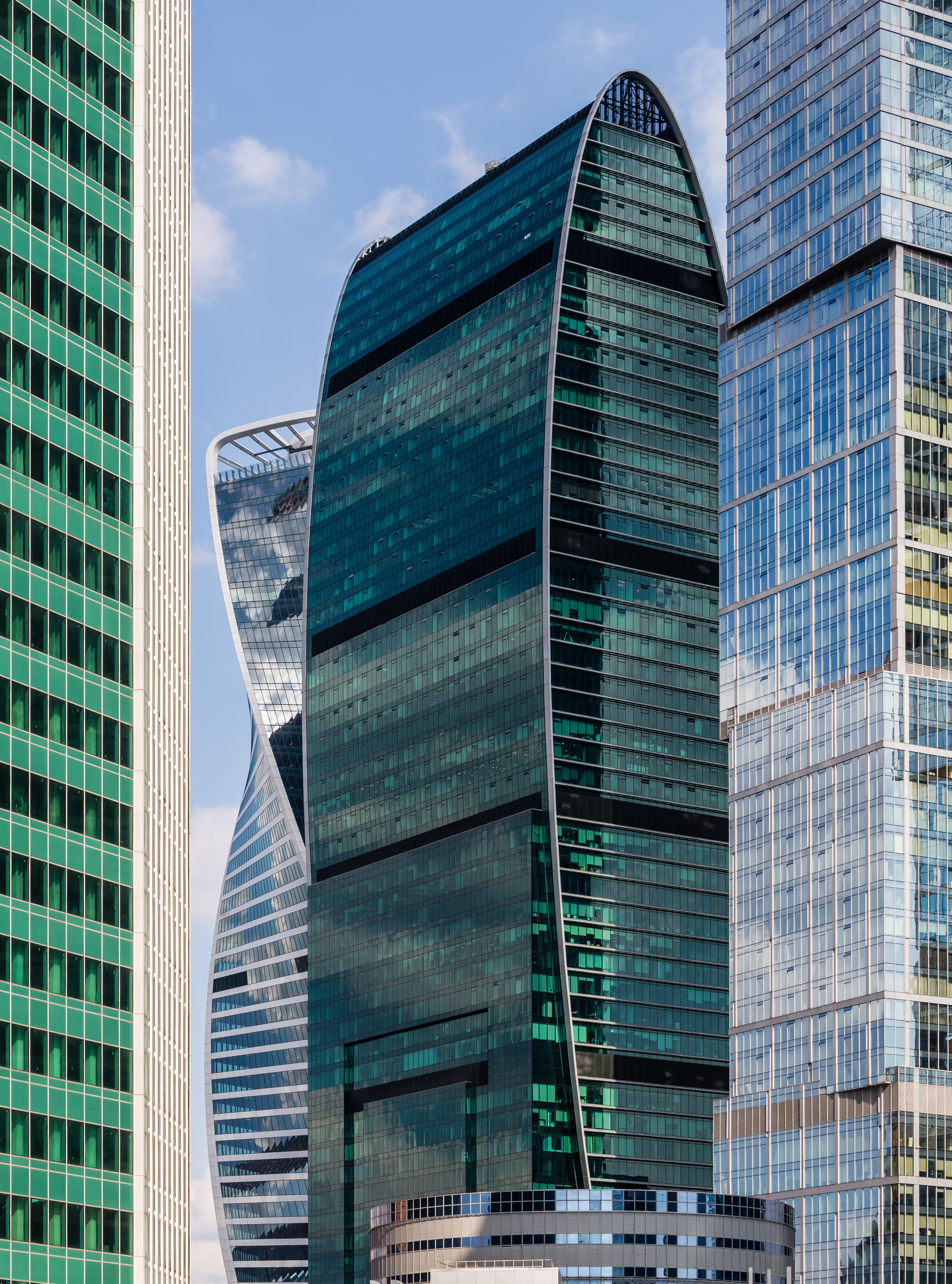
- Interactive map of the Imperia Tower area
- Alternative names: Aqua City Palace

General information
- Status: Stage 1: Complete; Stage 2: Under construction
- Type: Mixed-use
- Architectural style: Post-modernism
- Location: Moscow International Business Center, Moscow, Russia
- Coordinates: 55°44′51″N 37°32′27″E
- Construction started: Stage 1: 2003, 2006 (re-start); Stage 2: 2013
- Completed: Stage 1: 2011; Stage 2: 2018
- Cost: US$300 million
- Owner: Oleg Malis

Height
- Roof: Stage 1: 239 m (784 ft); Stage 2: 53 m (174 ft)

Technical details
- Floor count: Stage 1: 60; Stage 2: 14
- Floor area: 287,723 m^{2} (3,097,020 sq ft)
- Lifts/elevators: Stage 1: 30

Design and construction
- Architects: Enka Design; NBBJ
- Developer: GDO Group; MOS City Group
- Structural engineer: Arup
- Main contractor: Enka Insaat ve Sanayi A.S.

Website
- http://towerempire.ru/

Imperia Tower, is a complex located on plot 4 of the MIBC in Moscow, Russia. The 287,723 square metres (3,097,020 ft^{2}) mixed-use complex includes a completed 60-story skyscraper with a height of 239 metres (784 ft) and a 14-story building with a height of 53 metres (174 ft) that is currently under construction. Construction of the skyscraper started from 2001 to 2002, but halted in 2003 until it was resumed in 2006 and was completed in 2011. The 14-story building started construction in 2013 and finished by 2018. The 60-story skyscraper of the complex is the fifteenth-tallest building in Russia, and the 24th-tallest building in Europe.

== History ==
Construction of the Imperia Tower started from 2001 to 2002, but halted in 2003 due to financial problems. Construction resumed in 2006.

On 22 November 2011, Vladimir Resin, the first deputy mayor of Moscow, opened and commissioned the Imperia Tower to the public. Construction of the second stage of the Empire complex, a 14-story building, began in 2013 and was planned to finish by 2018.

== Overview ==
=== Purpose ===
The Imperial Tower complex is to serve as mixed-use development, providing 192 apartments, office space, 292 hotel rooms, and a fitness center. In addition, the complex also has 1,500 parking spaces for residents, tourists, and workers. Imperial Tower also has two escalators and thirty elevators.

=== Design ===
The main materials that make up the Imperial Tower complex are glass, steel, and reinforced concrete. The plot the complex is built on has a total area of 310,200 square metres (3,339,000 ft^{2}) while the space of the plot used to build the complex has a total area of 287,723 square metres (3,097,020 ft^{2}). The skyscraper of the complex has a height of 239 metres (784 ft).

== Gallery ==
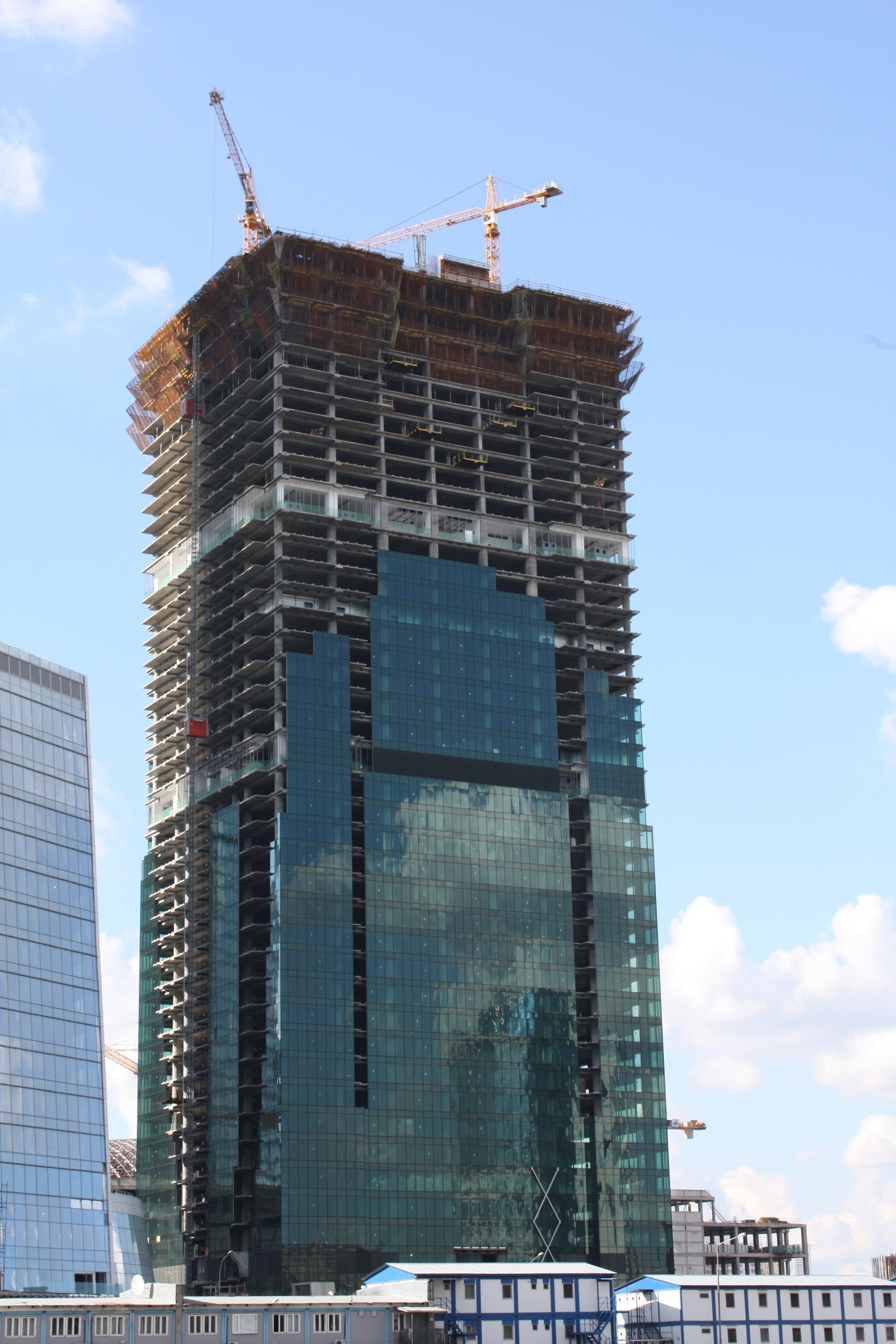
21 July 2008

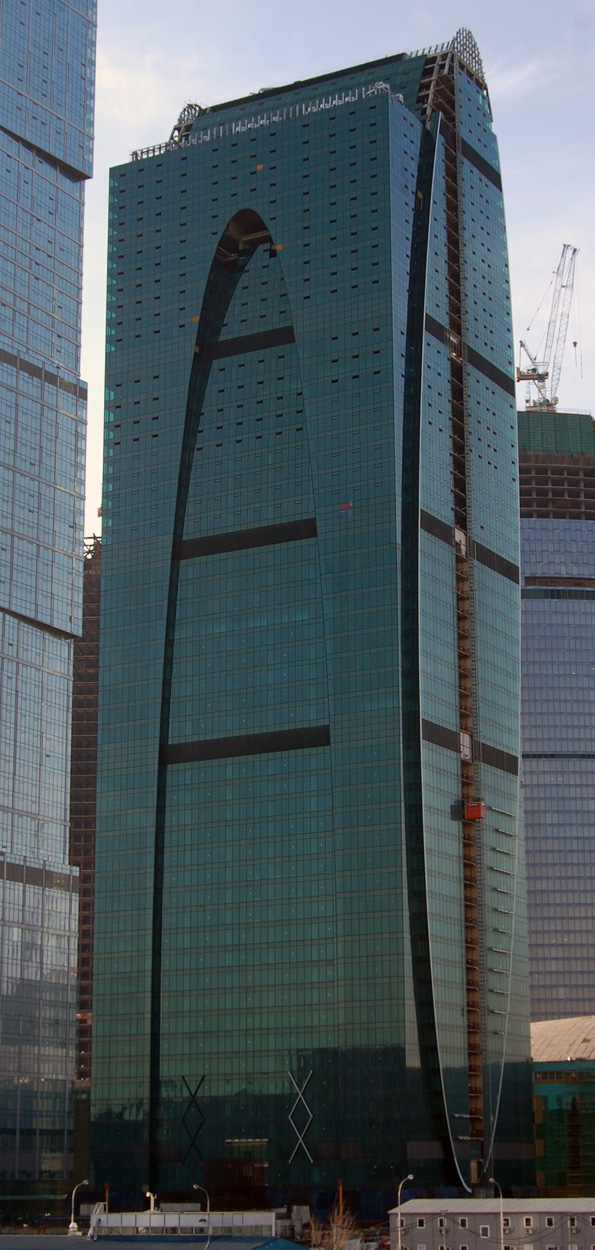
28 March 2010

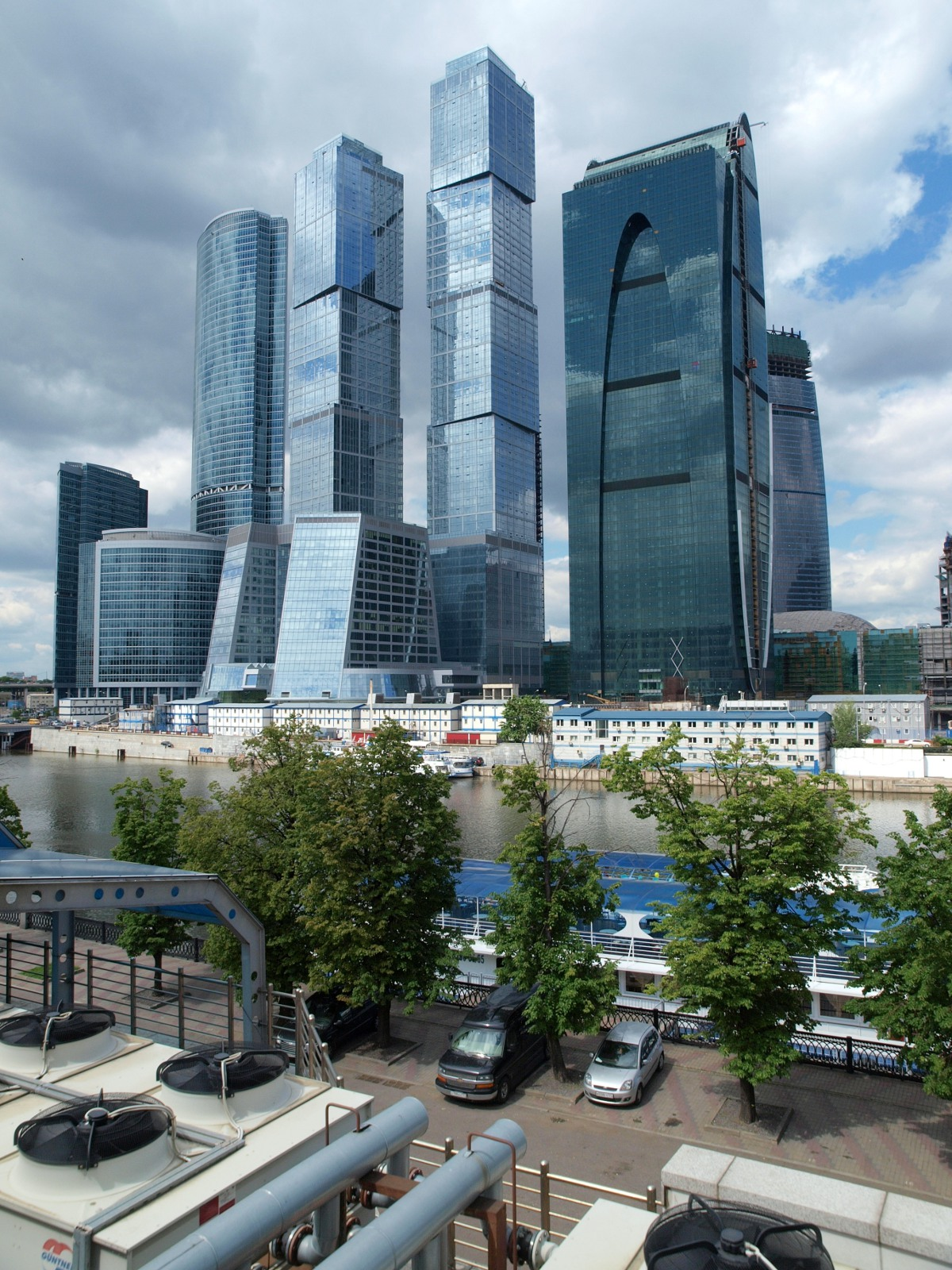
May 2010

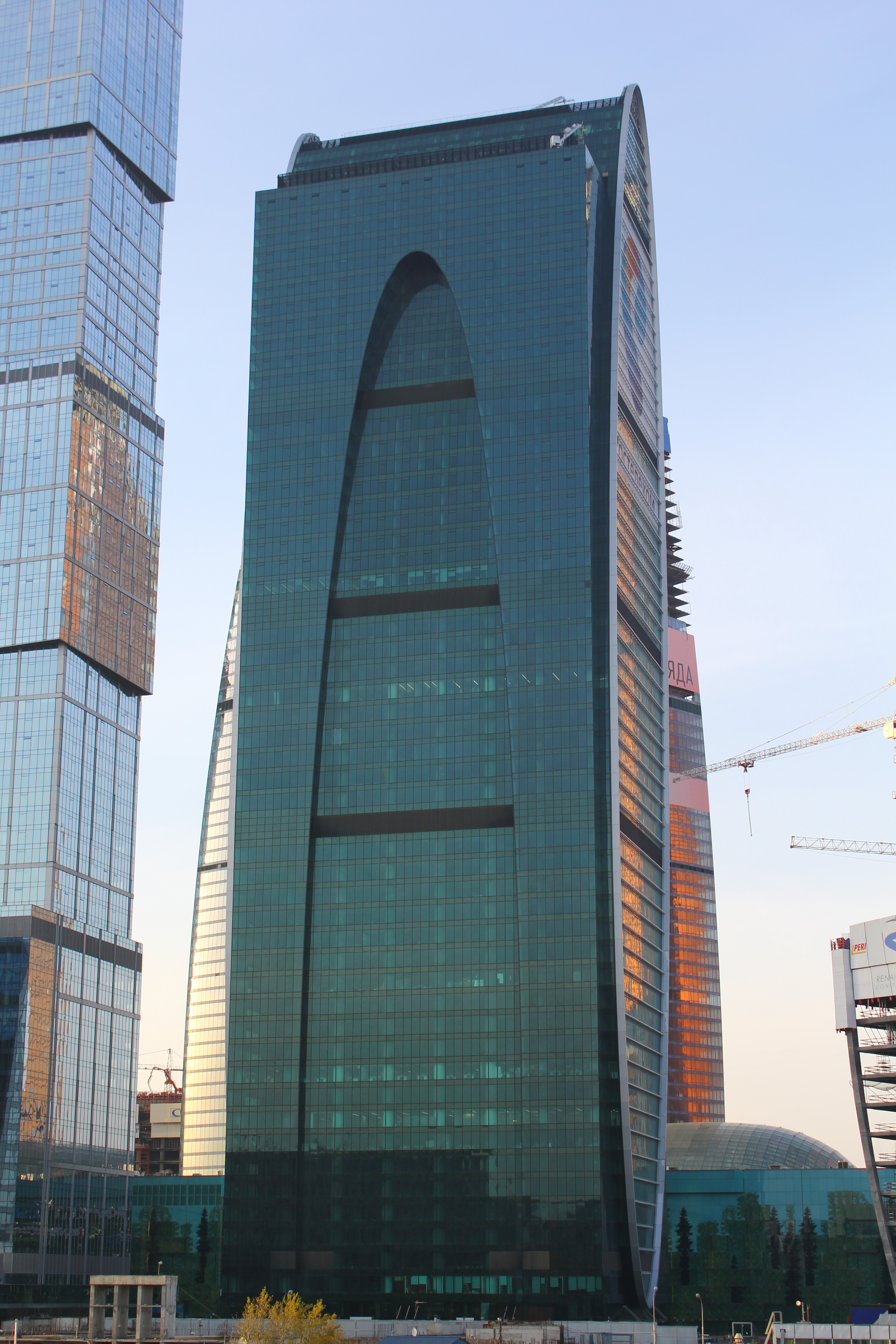
20 October 2012

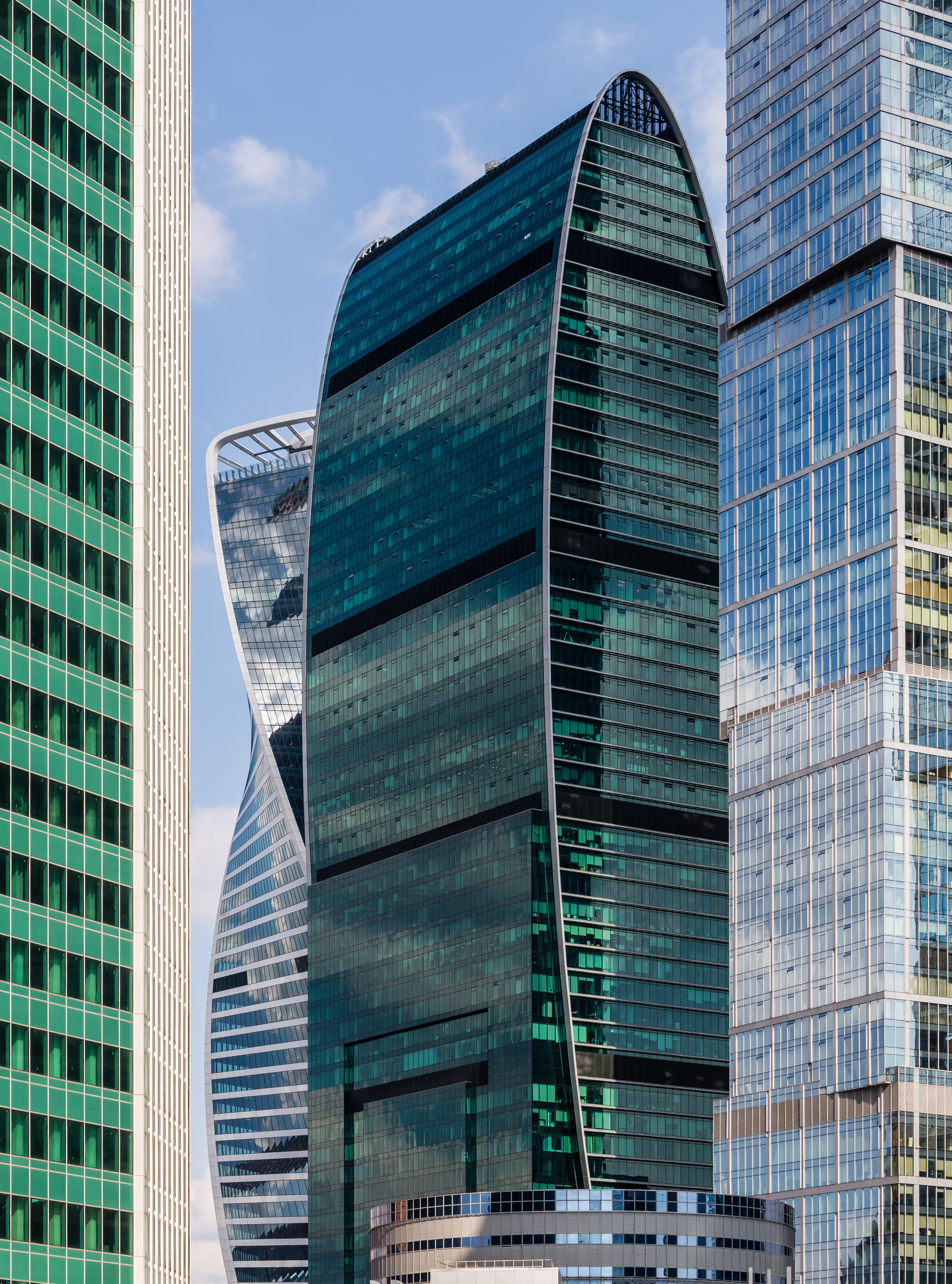
27 June 2016

== Controversy ==
Conflicts arose between the investors and developers of the construction of the Imperia Tower complex. In early 2012, the company CJSC Fleyner-City, owned by investor Pavel Fuchs, refused to participate in the joint construction of Imperia Tower with the private offshore Cypriot company Filtrand Properties Ltd., owned by Oleg Grankin, due to inadequate financing of construction by the investor. As a result, on 28 May 2012, Filtrand Properties Ltd. filed an application with the Arbitration Court of Moscow against CJSC Fleyner-City about the recognition of the unilateral refusal of the investing company from this agreement. As a result, after the judicial confrontation the parties on 29 December 2012 signed an agreement, according to which both companies had to transfer more than 20 thousand square meters to the skyscraper.

== See also ==
- List of tallest buildings in Russia
- List of tallest buildings in Europe
