= Shlyuzovoy Bridge =

Concrete cantilever bridge in Moscow, Russia

Coordinates: 55°43′52″N 37°38′55″E

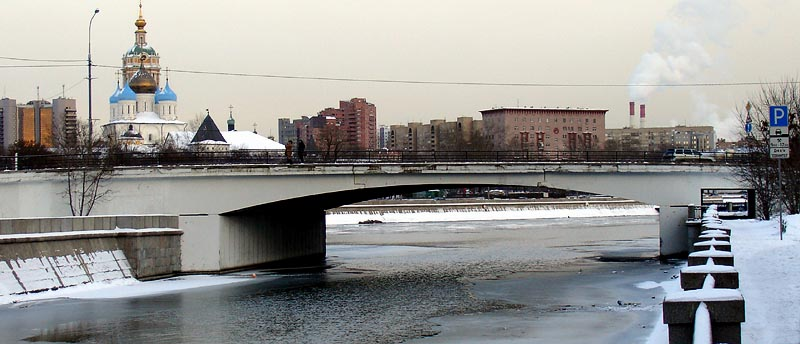
Schluzovoy bridge, Moskva River behind it, Novospassky Monastery in the distance

Shlyuzovoy Bridge (Russian: Шлюзовой мост, Sluice (Lock) Bridge) is a concrete cantilever bridge in Moscow, Russia, spanning the eastern extremity of Vodootvodny Canal and connecting right-bank embankments of Moskva River. Existing bridge was completed in 1965 by engineer Z.V. Freydina.

== History and specifications ==
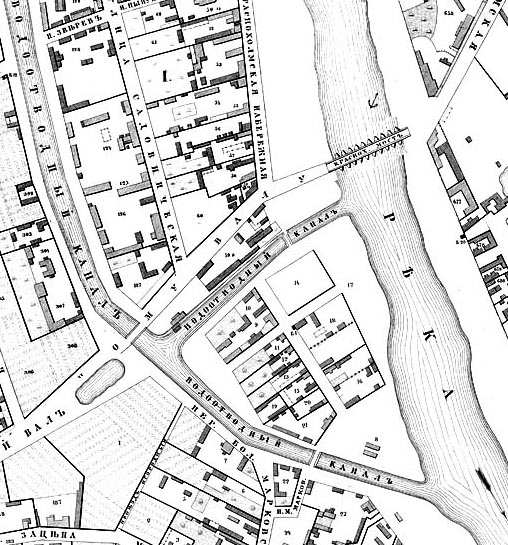
1853 map, showing the locks and wooden bridge (lower right). Note a secondary channel separating Red Hills (triangular island)from Sadovniki. Existing bridge was built at the very tip of Red Hills.

In the 19th century the eastern end of Vodootvodny Canal was closed by a dam with locks, located about 150 meters west (upstream) from the tip of Balchug island. In 1930s, this dam was demolished as part of Moscow Canal project and replaced with a temporary bridge for trams and automobiles. This bridge was torn down upon completion of Bolshoy and Maly Krasnokholmsky Bridges (before World War II).

Existing bridge was built in 1965 on a new site at the very tip of an island. This bridge looks like an arch bridge, but actually consists of two cantilevered consoles, extending 9.3 meters from the pillars, and a keystone center piece 14.0 meters long. Total length 49.8 meters, width 22.0 meters (including 15.0 meters automobile road).

== See also ==
- List of bridges in Moscow
