= Vodootvodny Canal =

Canal in Moscow, Russia

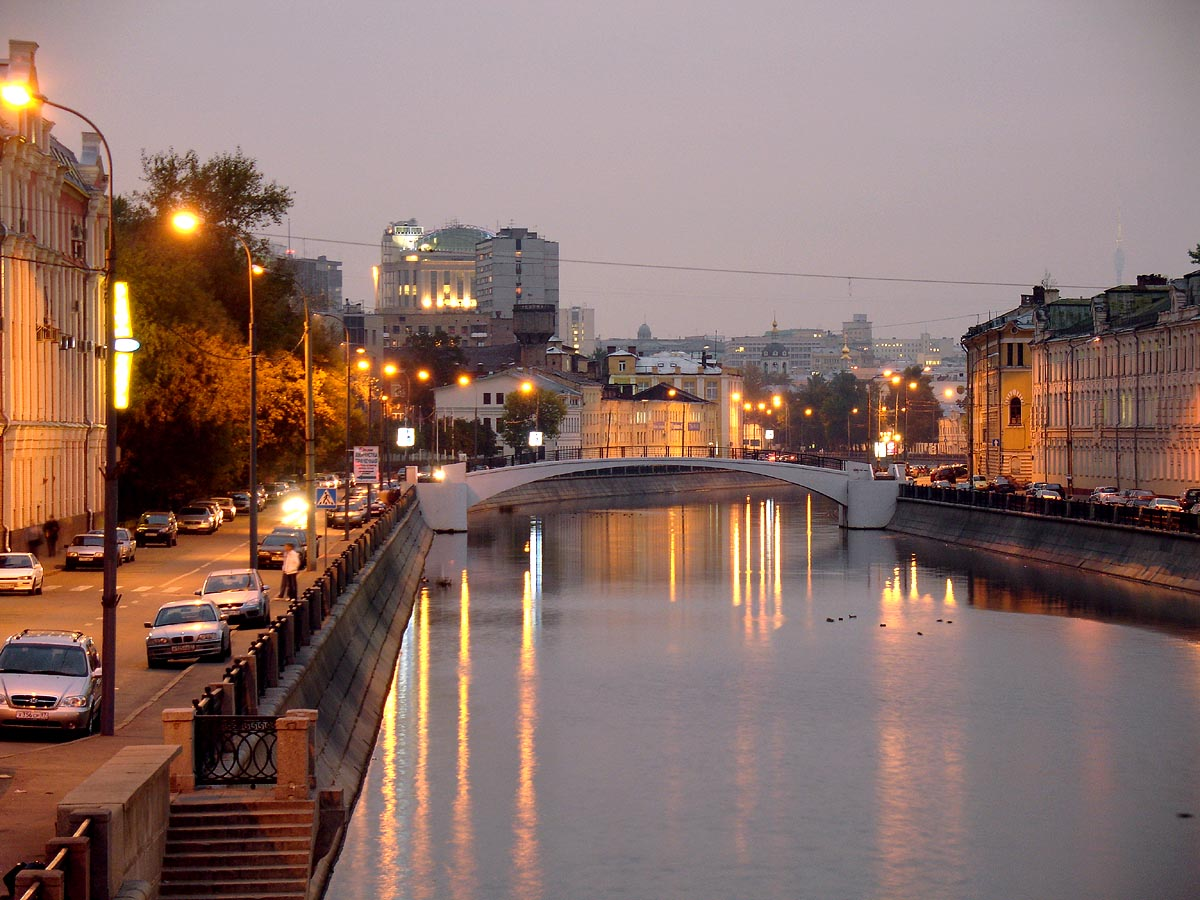
- The canal and the Zverev Bridge at dusk
- Location: Moscow, Russia

Specifications
- Length: 4 km (2.5 miles)

Geography
- Start point: Moscow River
- End point: Moscow River
- Beginning coordinates: 55°44′18″N 37°36′34″E

Vodootvodny Canal (Russian: Водоотводный канал, "water bypass canal") is a 4 kilometre long, 30-60 metre wide canal in downtown Moscow, Russia. It was built in the 1780s on the old riverbed of the Moskva River to control floods and support shipping. Canal construction created an island between the Moskva River and the canal. The island acquired its present shape in 1938 with the completion of Moscow Canal megaproject. The canal is spanned by ten bridges; the eleventh is now under construction.

== Moscow floods ==
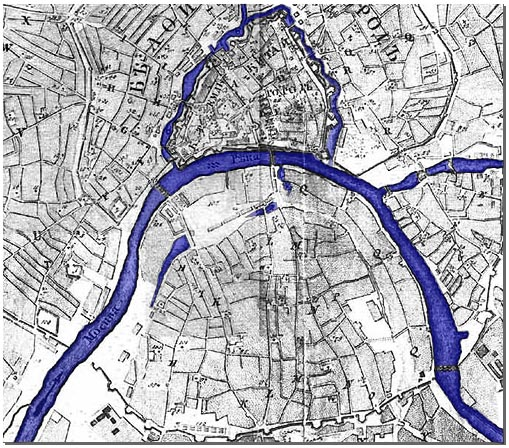
1739 map. River level shown at a summer low: old river bed dried out, leaving isolated patches of mud.

Zamoskvorechye, the land on the flat southern bank of Moskva river, was frequently flooded in spring. The river itself used to migrate south from its present site and back, discouraging construction. Low lands on both sides of the river were only suitable for farming. In dry periods, the old river bed used to shrink into isolated muddy swamps, spreading disease. Residents had to combat inundation levels by digging small moats and dikes, with little result. The memory of these moats (ровушки, ендовы; rovyshki, yendovy) remains in the names of Raushskaya embankment and Church of St. George v Yendove (literally, in the pot). The most notable, permanent moat was that separating St. George from Balchug Street.

== Kazakov project, 1775 ==
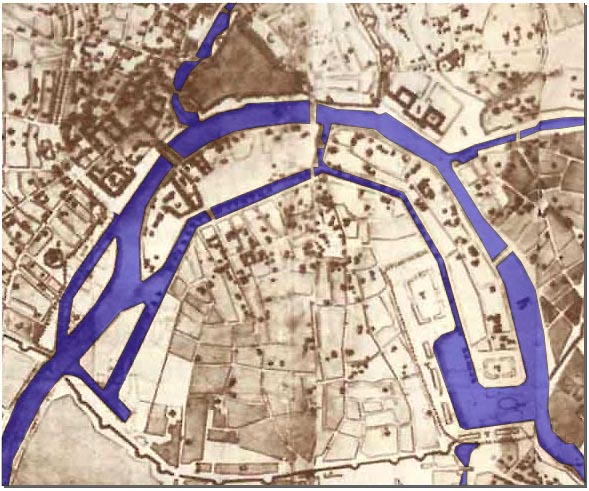
1775 Canal project by Matvey Kazakov

The first documented flood control project was drawn up in 1775, presumably by Matvey Kazakov (senior). In addition to creating an island separated from Zamoskvorechye, Kazakov also proposed cutting two flood control dikes west from Bersenevka. This would separate strips of floodland from the mainland, creating two more islands. In the east, Kazakov planned to flood uninhabited farmland permanently, and connect the Canal to the Moskva River inside the present-day Garden Ring. The eastern end of an island would become Moscow's fortified grain port and warehouse. The moat east of Balchug had to be cleared and widened, too.

== 1783–1786 canal ==
A notably devastating flood occurred in 1783, razing the suburbs and damaging Bolshoy Kamenny Bridge (three spans collapsed, killing four people). In order to repair it, the Moskva River was temporarily drained, and its water diverted into the old river bed. Prior to closing the main waterway, the old river bed was cleared and widened.

Kazakov's plan materialized in 1783–1786, excluding the grain terminal. An 1807 plan shows only one "additional" island west of Bersenevka; otherwise, it follows Kazakov's project; the main island is cut into two halves by the Balchug moat.

== 19th century ==
After the Fire of 1812, the western island and the dike separating it from the mainland were reclaimed for development (today, they form the Golden Mile of Khamovniki District). The Moskva River was reduced to about its present-day width (see the 1824 map). The eastern end of the Canal was also reduced to its ordinary width of 30 metres.

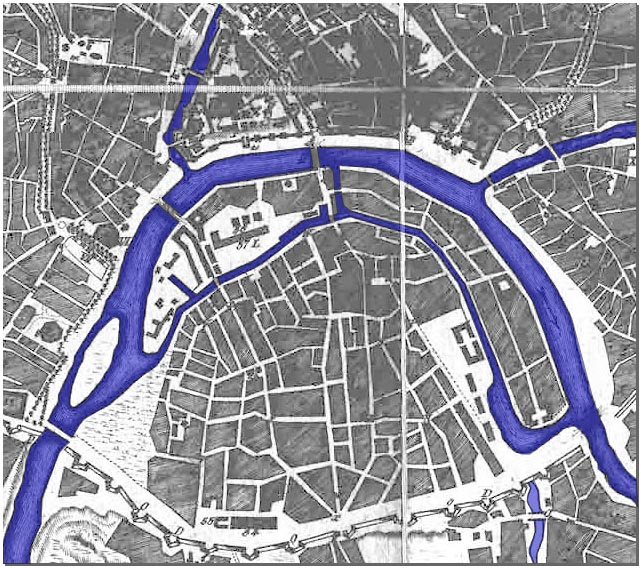
1807 map (actual)

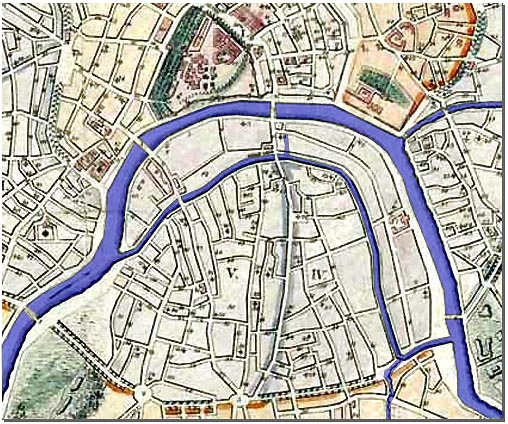
1824 map (project)

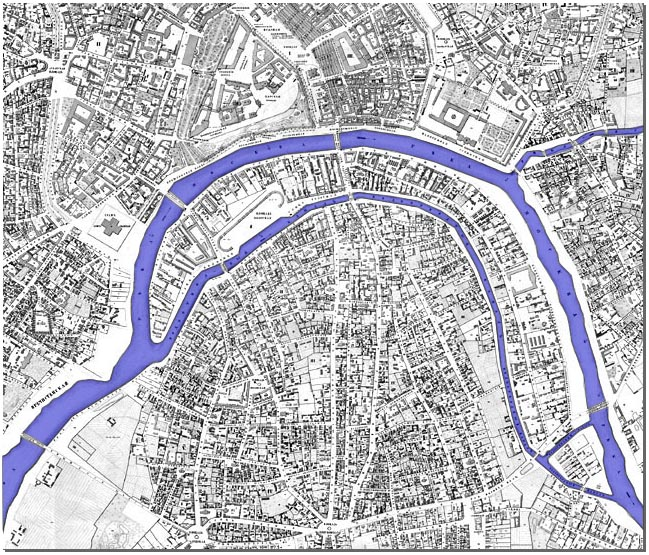
1853 map (actual)

In 1835, the city built Babyegorodskaya Dam west of the island. The dam was disassembled each autumn and set back in place after the spring flood, so it was good for shipping but useless against floods. A new channel extension east was built to bypass the old 90-degree turn; as the 1853 map shows, the new canal cut Red Hills neighborhood away from the mainland. For a while, the island was cut into three parts, then, when Balchug moat was filled, in two.

== 1930s – present day ==
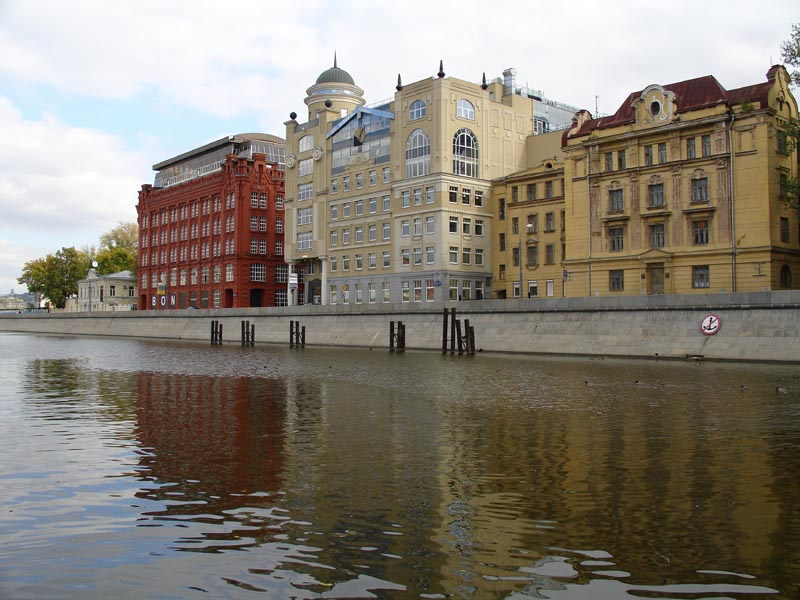
Golutvin Sloboda offices, converted 19th century factories across the Canal

The completion of the Moscow Canal (1932–1938) raised the water level in the Moskva River and the canal, enabling reliable shipping throughout summer seasons. Locks on the canal were demolished (this function was taken by Pererva locks downstream). The moat parallel to Garden Ring was also filled in the 1930s, with the completion of Bolshoy Krasnokholmsky Bridge.

The first bridges of the Soviet age, Komissariatsky bridge (1927) and the pedestrian Zverev Bridge (1927) were built with sufficient clearance. Chugunny Bridge (1889) was also compatible with new requirements (completion of a new Bolshoy Moskvoretsky Bridge diverted traffic away from this bridge). All other bridges were rebuilt in the 1930s to 6-8 traffic lanes.

In the 1960s, Schluzovoy Bridge construction connected the embankments on the eastern tip of the island. Chugunny Bridge steel deck was replaced with concrete. Sadovnichesky Bridge was completed in 1963; it is actually a water pipe conduit with a secondary function of a pedestrian bridge. Two more pedestrian bridges, Second Schluzovoy and Luzhkov Bridge, were added in the 1990s. Construction of the Patriarshy Bridge extension over the canal is currently under way.

The city planners entertain plans to build a parking lot under the canal, from across Golutvin sloboda office block (see photo above), to Tretyakov Gallery. This would require setting up dams, temporarily drying up the canal and digging the open pit.
