= Sadovnichesky Bridge =

Cоncrete pedestrian arch bridge in Moscow, Russia

Coordinates: 55°44′45″N 37°37′50″E

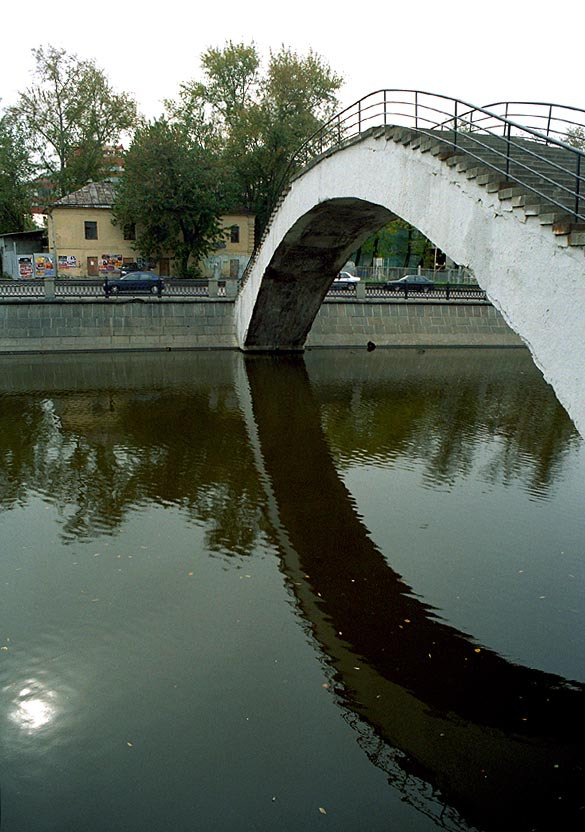
Sadovnichesky Bridge

Sadovnichesky Bridge (Russian: Cадовнический мост) is a cоncrete pedestrian arch bridge that spans Vodootvodny Canal in historical Zamoskvorechye district of Moscow, Russia. The bridge connects Balchug island with Zamoskvorechye mainland. It was built in 1963, designed by Nina Bragina (structural engineering), V.A. Korchagin and K.P. Savelyev (architectural design). It is Moscow's nearest adaptation of a Moon bridge.

== History and specifications ==
The bridge emerged as a conduit for water pipes; pedestrian walkway is a secondary function. Arches are unusually thick for a bridge of this size due to pipe diameter (75 centimeters); bridge engineers called it Mastodon.

According to chief engineer, Nina Bragina, prefabricated concrete was chosen under political pressure (in situ concrete would be faster and cheaper). As a result, curved concrete boxed required extensive work and rework at the concrete panel plant.

The arch is 32.0 meters long, 6.2 meters high and 3.5 meters wide. Each end of the arch is supported by 16 piles, including 4 straight and 12 angled.

== See also ==
- List of bridges in Moscow
