= Patriarshy Bridge =

Bridge in Moscow, Russia

Coordinates: 55°44′36″N 37°36′32″E

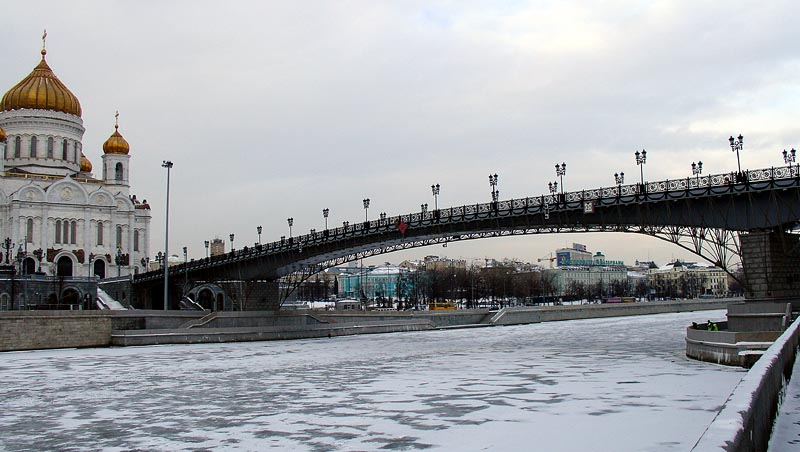
Patriarshy Bridge

Patriarshy Bridge (Russian: Патриарший Мост/Patriarchal Bridge) is a steel pedestrian box girder bridge that spans Moskva River and Vodootvodny Canal, connecting Cathedral of Christ the Saviour with Bersenevka in downtown Moscow, Russia (0.6 kilometers west from the Kremlin). It was built in 2004, designed by Mikhail Posokhin. The second part of the bridge spanning Vodootvodny Canal was opened in September 2007.

== Specifications ==
Length (first part) 203 meters, width 10 meters. The very shallow arch is a simple steel box; lace-like "trusses" are for decoration only.

== Future development ==
Southern end of the bridge right now terminates at the second floor of the future trade complex on Yakimanskaya naberezhnaya which is yet to be built. Also, a new parking in the lower part of the bridge is planned to open.

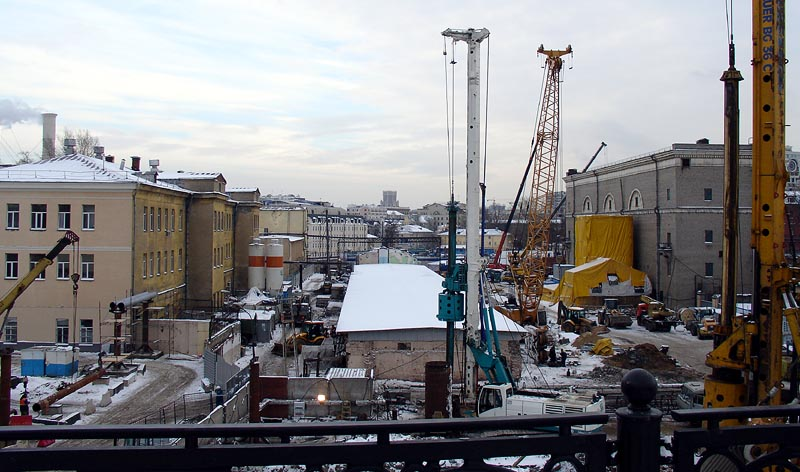
Looking south-east from Patriarshy Bridge, January 2007: planned extension site, demolition underway. The tower in the middle of horizon is Paveletskaya Plaza, near Paveletsky Terminal, less than 2 km away

== See also ==
- List of bridges in Moscow
