= Children Are the Victims of Adult Vices =

Sculpture by Mihail Chemiakin

- Artist: Mihail Chemiakin
- Completion date: 2001 (unveiled)
- Type: Bronze sculpture
- Location: Moscow, Russia; 55.745935°N 37.619376°E

Children Are the Victims of Adult Vices is a group of bronze sculptures created by Russian artist Mihail Chemiakin. The sculptures are located in a park in Bolotnaya Square, Balchug, 2,000 feet (610 metres) south of the Moscow Kremlin behind the British Ambassador's residence.

The monument consists of 15 sculptures. In the center of the composition are two blindfolded children. At their feet are two books: Russian Tales and Alexander Pushkin’s Fairy Tales, as well as a globe. The figures of children are surrounded by sculptures in the form of anthropomorphic monsters, personifying "adult" vices:

- Drug addiction – depicted as a bald man with bent wings offering a syringe.
- Prostitution – depicted as a woman with the head of a frog.
- Theft – depicted as a man with a boar's head, carrying away a bag of money.
- Alcoholism – depicted as Bacchus holding a goblet.
- Ignorance – depicted as a donkey holding a rattle in his hands.
- Pseudo-science is depicted as a caricature of Themis with a helmet over her eyes, a scroll with an alchemical tree, and a two-headed puppet.
- Propaganda of violence is depicted as an arms dealer.
- Sadism is depicted as a cassocked figure with a rhinoceros head.
- An empty pillory represents the forgotten victims of repression.
- The exploitation of child labor – depicted as a factory owner with the head of a bird.
- Poverty – depicted as an old woman begging for alms.
- War - a figure with bent wings and a gas mask resembling a character from Pink Floyd’s or a battle droid from Star Wars, holding a bomb with the head of Mickey Mouse. The wings are the same as those of Drug addiction.
- Indifference stands in the center of the composition and is shown as a many-armed figure, both deaf and unseeing.

The sculpture was commissioned by then-Mayor Yuri Luzhkov and sponsored by the state-owned oil company Rosneft. It was unveiled in 2001 amid some controversy. Some Muscovites worried that the graphic imagery would frighten children. Chemiakin said that, "[The sculpture] ... was conceived and carried out by me as a symbol and a call to fight for the salvation of present and future generations."

== See also ==
- Allegory of Gluttony and Lust
