= Island (Zamoskvorechye) =

Area of Moscow, Russia

Coordinates: 55.7444°N 37.6167°E

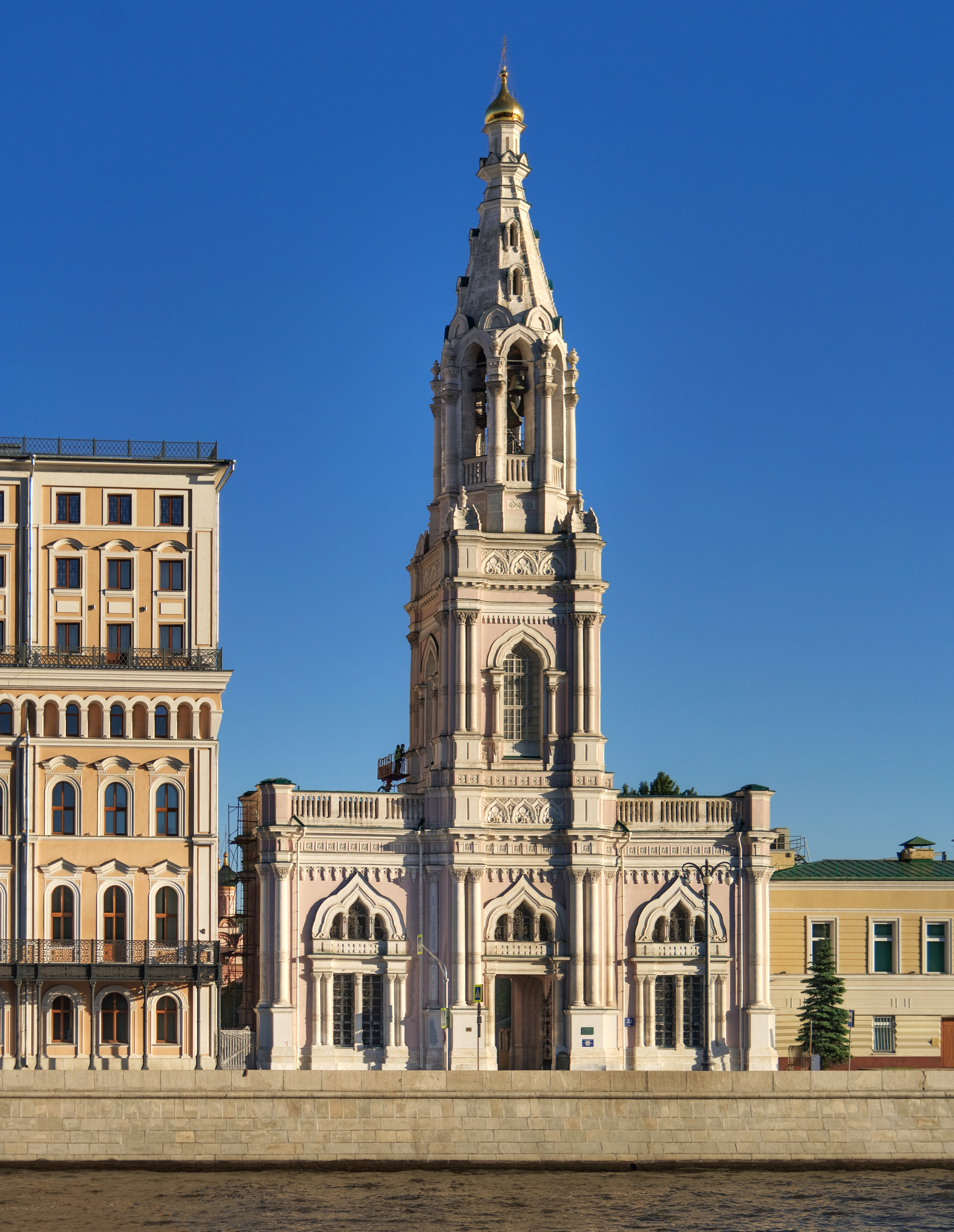
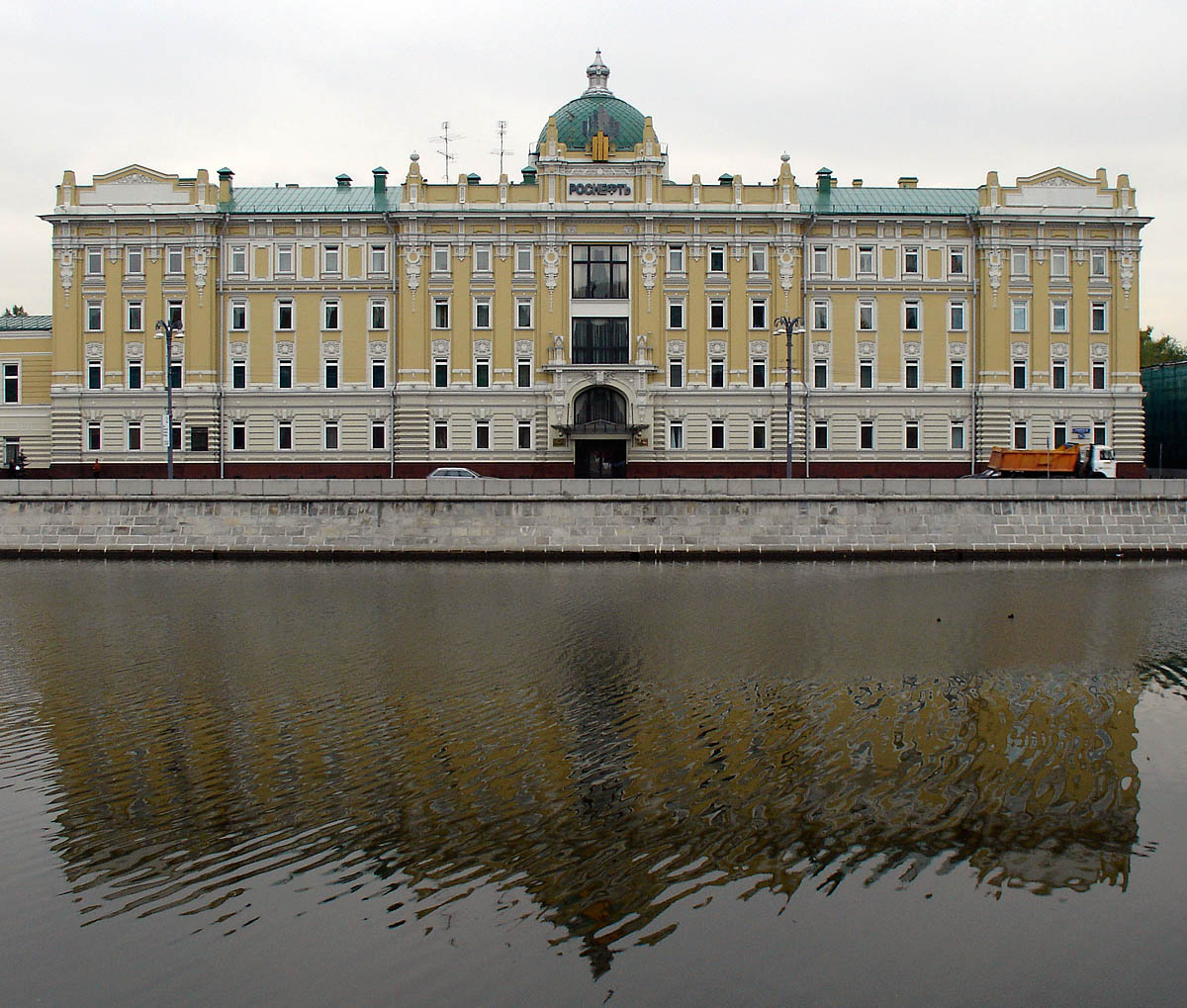
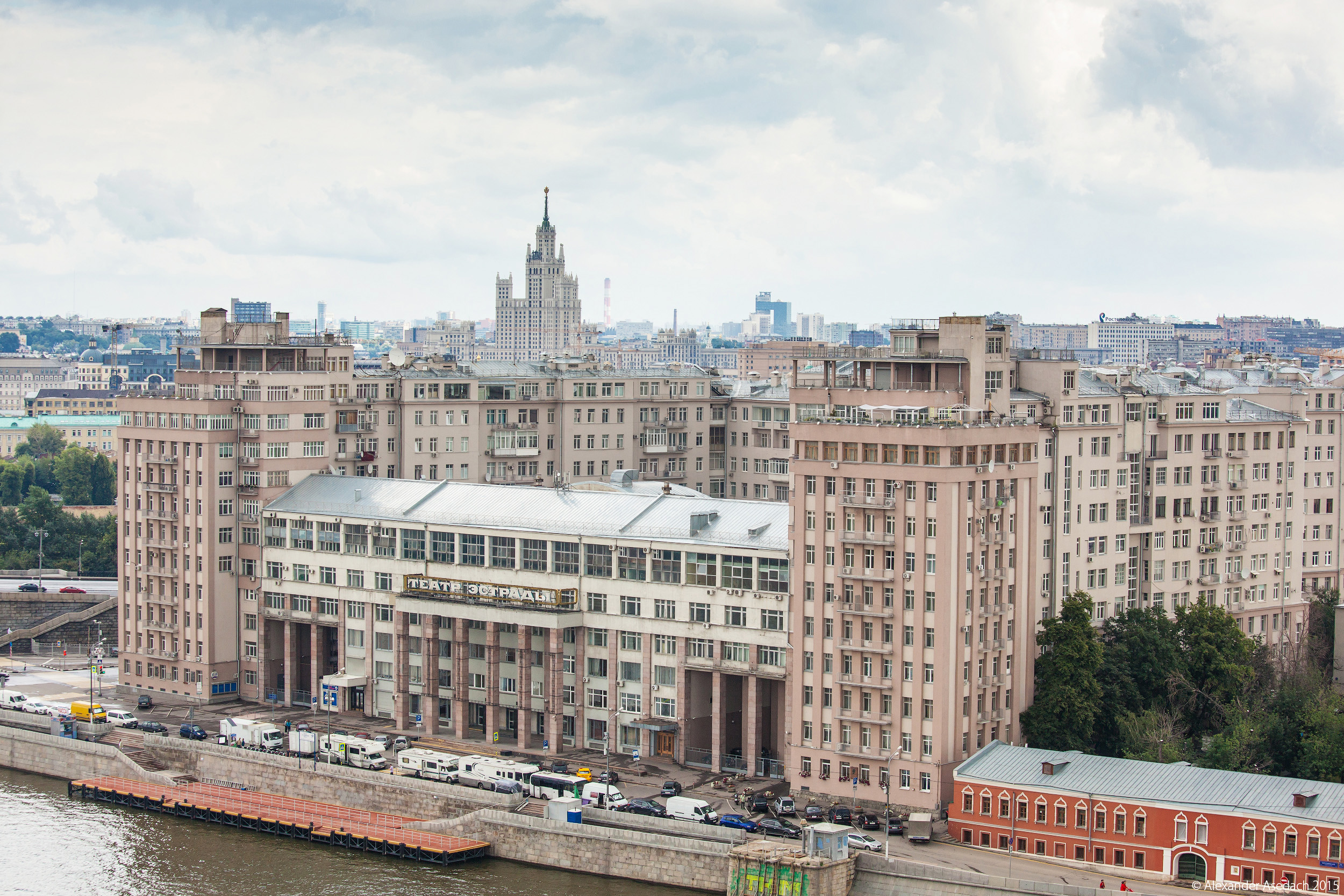
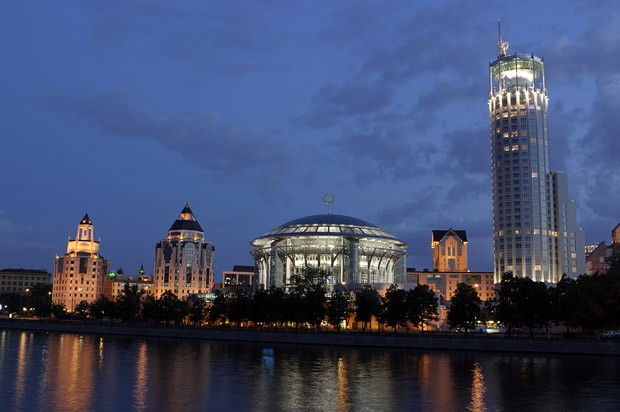
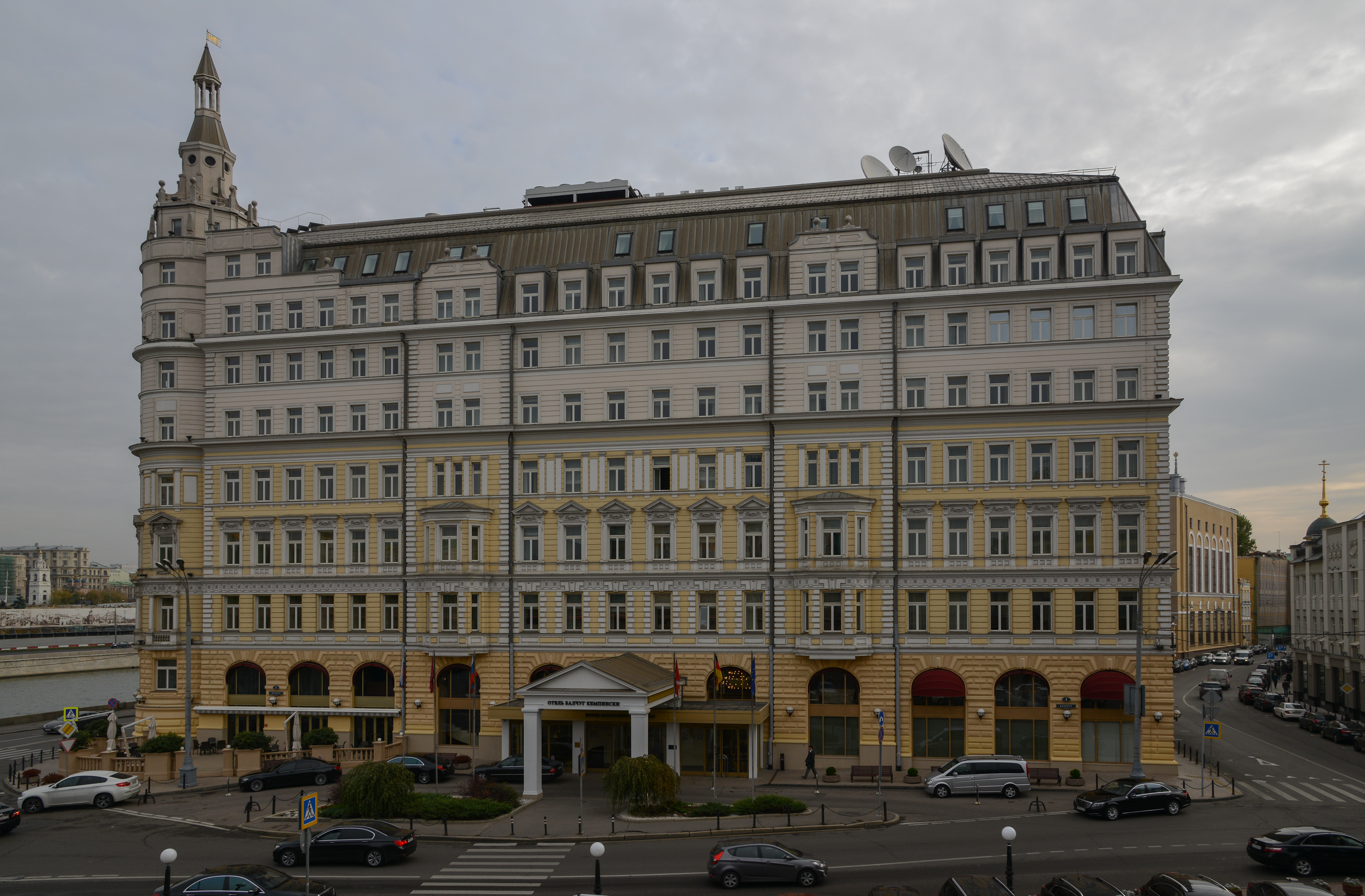
- Clockwise from top: Saint Sophia Church, House on the Embankment, Hotel Baltschug Kempinski, Moscow International House of Music and Swissôtel Krasnye Holmy, Rosneft Headquarters
- Interactive map of Island

Geography
- Location: Moscow; Central Administrative Okrug; Zamoskvorechye District; Yakimanka District

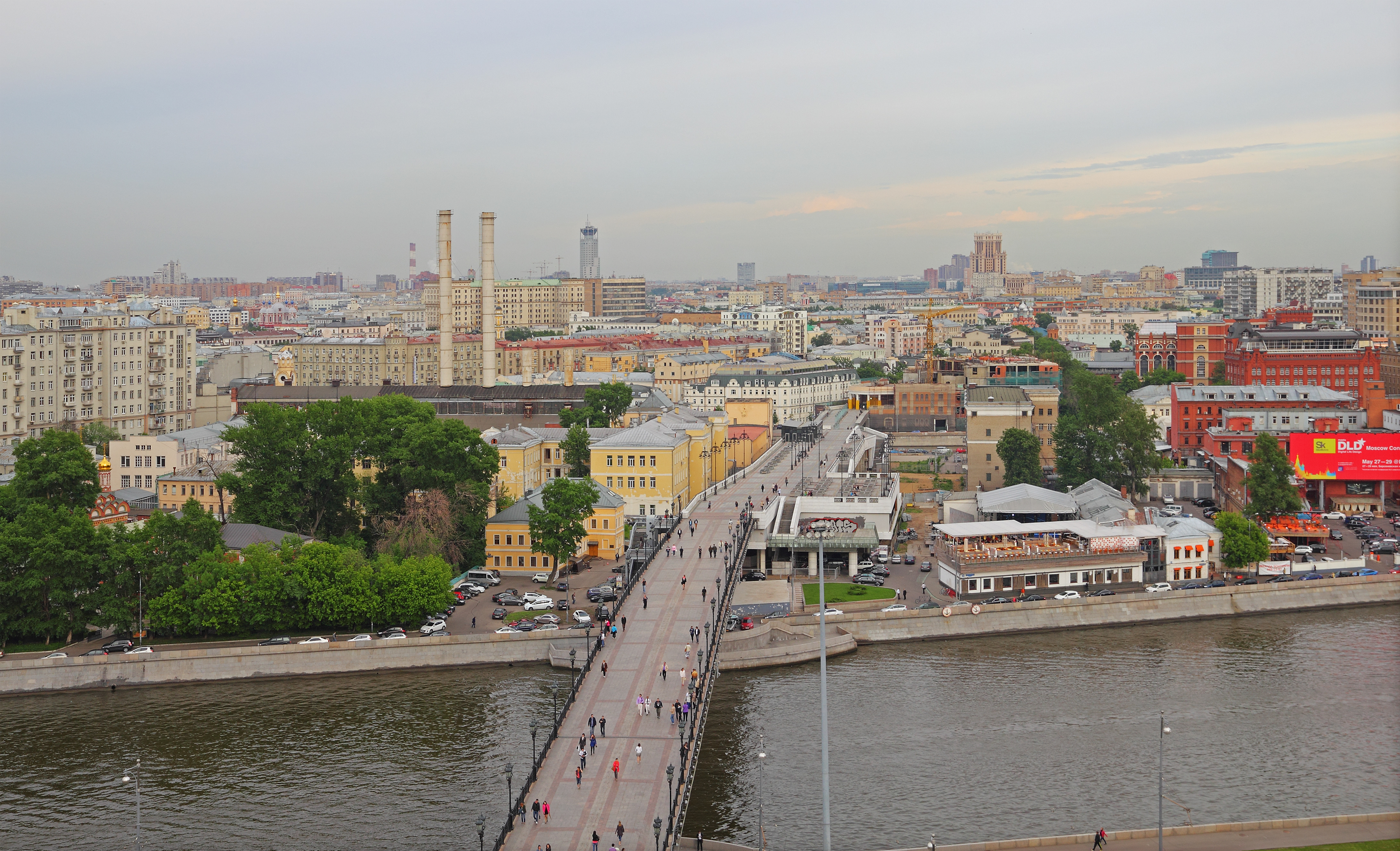
A view over Balchug and the Moskva River, as seen from the Cathedral of Christ the Saviour

Island (or Zamoskvorechye) is an area in Moscow. It is made up of an artificial island and is located right across from the Kremlin between the Moskva River and its old riverbed, which was turned into the Vodootvodny Canal in 1786. It does not have any historical, official or established name. In the relevant sources, it is referred to simply as the Island.

The island a part of the historical Zamoskvorechye area. The island itself was split into four localities: Bersenevka (Russian: Берсе́невка), Boloto (Russian: Боло́то, swamp), Balchug (Russian: Ба́лчуг), Sadovniki (Russian: Садовники, after the gardens).

Despite the lack of the name proper in some popular publications the island was either referred to by the name of one of the localities on it: Balchug, Bolotny, Sadovnicheskiy or due to its proximity to the Kremlin as Kremlevskiy or due to its land value as Zolotoy (after gold) or simply Bezymyanniy (nameless).

== History ==
=== Balchug Street ===
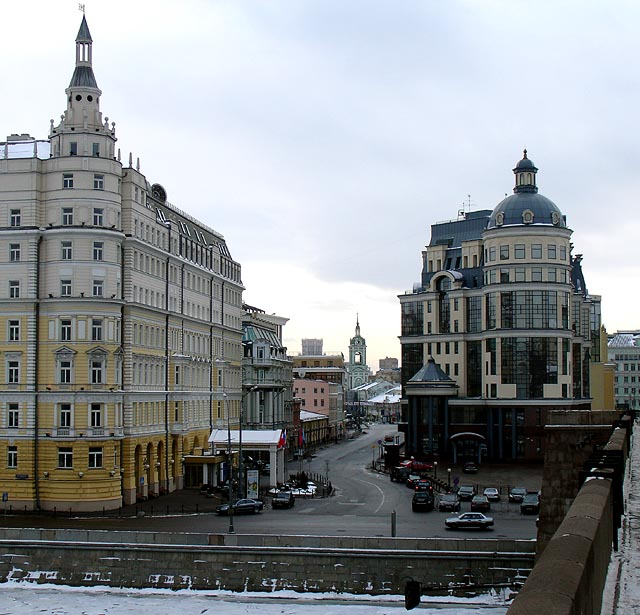
Balchug street, as seen from Bolshoy Moskvoretsky Bridge. Baltschug Kempinski Hotel (left), Central Bank building (right)

Balchug is one of the oldest Moscow streets outside of the Kremlin walls. It emerged towards the end of the 14th century, when the new Kremlin built by Dmitri Donskoi pushed the posad settlement into what is known today as the Red Square as well as areas further east. The main trading road to the south and the river crossing also moved to the east, to present-day Balchug and Pyatnitskaya streets. The name Balchug comes from Tatar balčyk, meaning "dirt" or "mud". Muddy conditions in the area were caused by migrations of the river bed, frequent floods, and inadequate drainage.

In the 15th century, Prince Vasili I set up royal gardens west of Balchug Street across from the Kremlin. The gardeners settled east of Balchug, giving its name to the Sadovniki neighborhood and present-day Sadovnicheskaya Street. They set up flood control moats connecting the Moskva River with the old riverbed. Memories of those medieval moats — rovushki and endovy in Old Russian — survive in the names of Raushskaya Embankment and St. George Church "v Endove" (1653). One moat was just 50 meters east of Balchug Street and survived until the 1850s.

Eventually, as the city grew south into Zamoskvorechye, Balchug became a market street, with butchers, bakers, inns, and public baths, according to tax records from 1669. In 1701, the Gardens and Balchug were swept by fire; another fire followed in 1730. The market reappeared each time, but in 1735 the government relocated the butchers beyond the city limits; by 1744 the market was selling mostly horses.

The 1783 flood destroyed most of Balchug and Sadovniki, including the St. George bell tower. By 1786, the city built the original Vodootvodny Canal, a flood control dike following the old river bed. The first metal bridge in Moscow, Chugunny Bridge (1830), connected Balchug with the Zamoskvorechye mainland. A steel bridge north, to Red Square and Zaryadye, was completed in 1872. Until the 1930s, Balchug remained a street of two-story shops; the only four-story building belonged to the Novomoskovskaya Hotel (now the Baltschug Kempinski Hotel).

Construction of the new Bolshoy Moskvoretsky Bridge (1938) changed the street's status again. The main north-south artery moved west, bypassing Balchug. Houses between the bridge and Balchug street were razed (the northern end of this site remains vacant). What was left in the 1930s was destroyed in the 1990s. First, the old Balchug Hotel was built out from 4 to 9 stories high, then a Central Bank building replaced the few surviving buildings between the bridge and Balchug. One 19th century single-story building remains as a facade curtain for a nine-story office block (see facadism).

=== Vodootvodny Canal ===
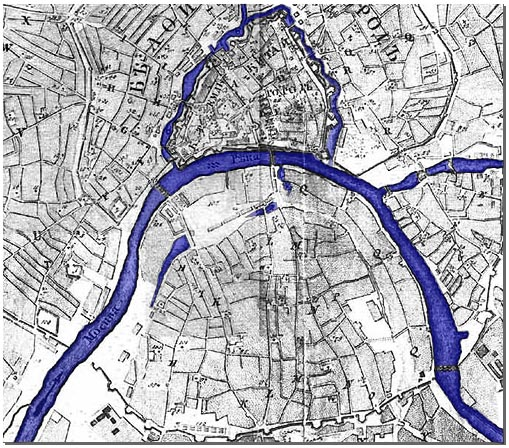
1739 map, before the Canal. River level shown at a summer low: old river bed dried out, leaving isolated patches of mud. White fields near the rivers are the uninhabited floodlands

In 1692 Bolshoi Kamenny Bridge, the first permanent bridge in the city, linked Zamoskvorechye with the city to the north. Four years later, Russia's first triumphal arch was built in front of the bridge in order to welcome Peter I's return from the Azov campaigns. In 1783, the area was swept away by a severe flood that damaged the bridge; in order to repair it, the Moskva River was temporarily drained, while its old riverbed was reconstructed into the four-kilometer-long Vodootvodny Canal (English: "Water Bypass Channel"), which is now spanned by ten bridges.

=== Kazakov's developments ===
The first documented project was drawn in 1775, presumably by Matvey Kazakov (senior). In addition to separating Balchug Island from Zamoskvorechye, he proposed cutting two flood control dikes west of Bersenevka to create two more islands. In the east, he planned to flood uninhabited farmland and connect the canal to Moskva River inside the present-day Garden Ring; the island's east would also serve as the city's grain port and warehouse. The moat east of Balchug had to be cleared and widened, too.

This plan was implemented in between 1783 and 1786 (the grain terminal was never built). An 1807 plan shows only one additional island west of Bersenevka; otherwise, it follows Kazakov's project, with the main island cut into two halves by the Balchug moat.

Evolution of Vodootvodny Canal and the island

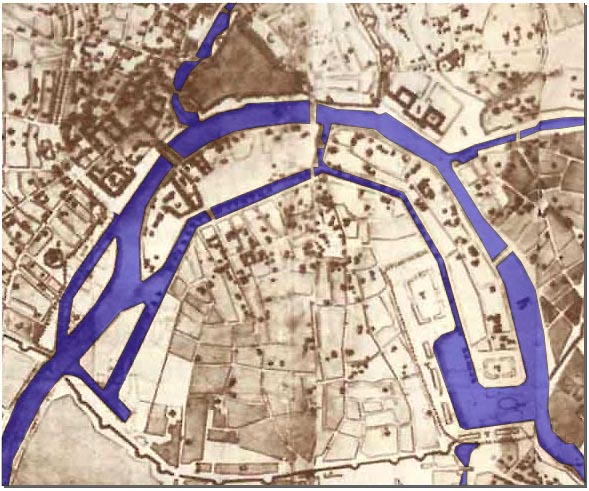
1775 Canal project by Matvey Kazakov

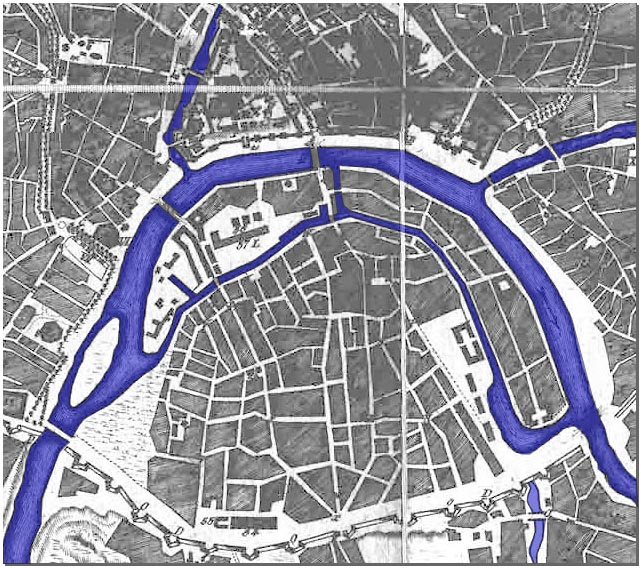
1807 map (actual)

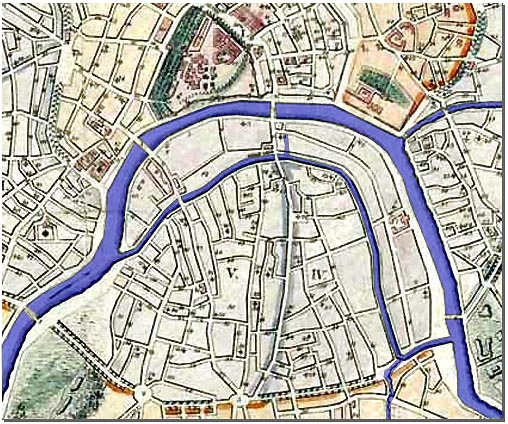
1824 map (project)

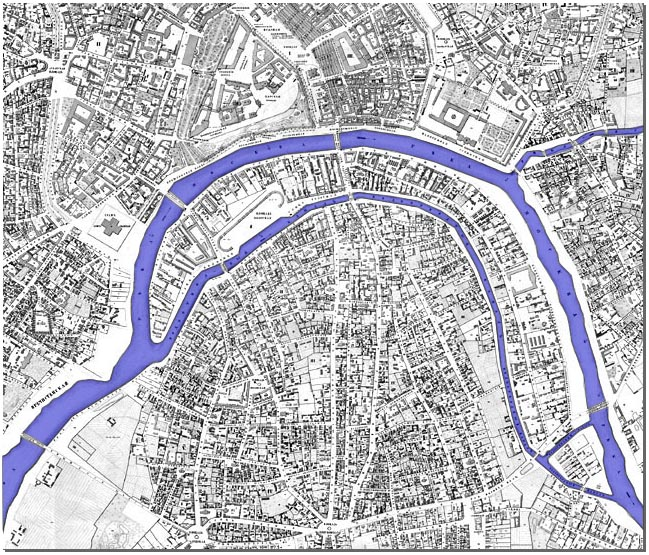
1853 map (actual)

After the fire of 1812, the western island and the dike separating it from the mainland were reclaimed for development, and the Moskva River was reduced to its present-day width (see 1824 map). The canal's eastern end was also reduced to its original width of 30 meters.

In 1835, the city built the Babyegorodskaya Dam west of the island, which enabled barge shipping up the canal. A new channel extension east was built to bypass the old 90-degree turn; as the 1853 map shows, the new canal cut the Red Hills neighborhood away from the mainland. For a while, the island was cut into three parts, then, when the Balchug moat was filled, in two. The moat parallel to the Garden Ring was filled in the 1930s when the Bolshoy Krasnokholmsky Bridge was completed.

== Neighborhoods ==
Four pairs of bridges (Bolshoy Kamenny, Moskvoretsky, Ustinsky, Krasnokholmsky over the Moskva River and their lesser siblings over the Canal) cut the island into five distinct parts. In addition to the bridges listed above, the island is connected to the Zamoskvorechye mainland by two road and four pedestrian bridges over the Vodootvodny Canal; an extension of Patriarshy Bridge is under construction, scheduled for completion at the end of 2007. The City announced plans to build a pedestrian bridge across the Moskva River in Red Hills, but no draft had been published as of 2007.

=== Bersenevka ===
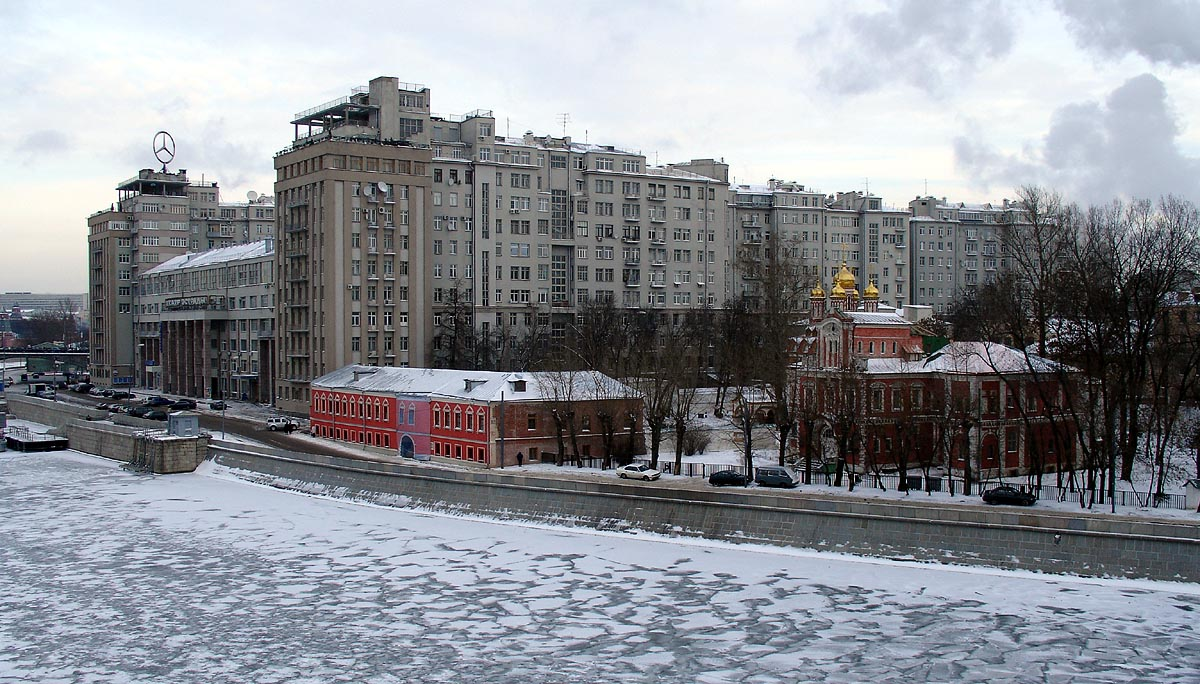
House on Embankment, 1927-1931, as seen from Patriarshy Bridge. Averky Kirillov estate, right

Bersenevka, the oldest part of the island, boasts architectural diversity with buildings such as the Averky Kirillov estate (1650s, rebuilt 1703-1711), including the manor house, and the St. Nicholas Church. The river banks are dominated by the red-brick buildings of the former Krasny Oktyabr chocolate factory (north) and the yellow Second Powerplant. The grey House on Embankment, facing east, houses two theaters.

City planners have been considering converting the Bersenevka industrial buildings into an upscale hotel and condominium. The work accelerated when the Guta Development was hired to manage the project.

=== Boloto ===
Former British Embassy in Boloto, facing Kremlin

Boloto, in Russian, is literally "swamp". The territory was occupied by royal gardens until 1701. Later, it was cleared for a parade ground and witnessed a number of public executions, including that of Emelyan Pugachev and his fellow Cossack rebels on January 21 [O.S. January 10] 1775.

Despite the unprepossessing name, Boloto was home to some of the finest mansions. One, owned by industrialist Gustav List, eventually became the British Embassy. In the 1890s, Moscow started a public housing experiment that led to the construction of block-wide apartment houses, one of which now serves as Rosneft's headquarters. The city had plans to rebuild the low-rise Boloto but as of 2007, they had not materialized. Many historical houses have been evacuated and have stood unattended for years. Bolotnaya Square, which faces the canal, contains Mikhail Chemiakin's controversial sculptures that personify human vice.

=== Balchug ===
Balchug is the short stretch between Bolshoy Moskvoretsky Bridge and Bolshoy Ustinsky Bridge, including Balchug Street and the beginning of Sadovnicheskaya Street), is the densest area of the island. It houses Moscow's first electrical powerplant (still active); offices are occupied by electrical (Mosenergo) and oil companies.

=== Sadovniki East ===
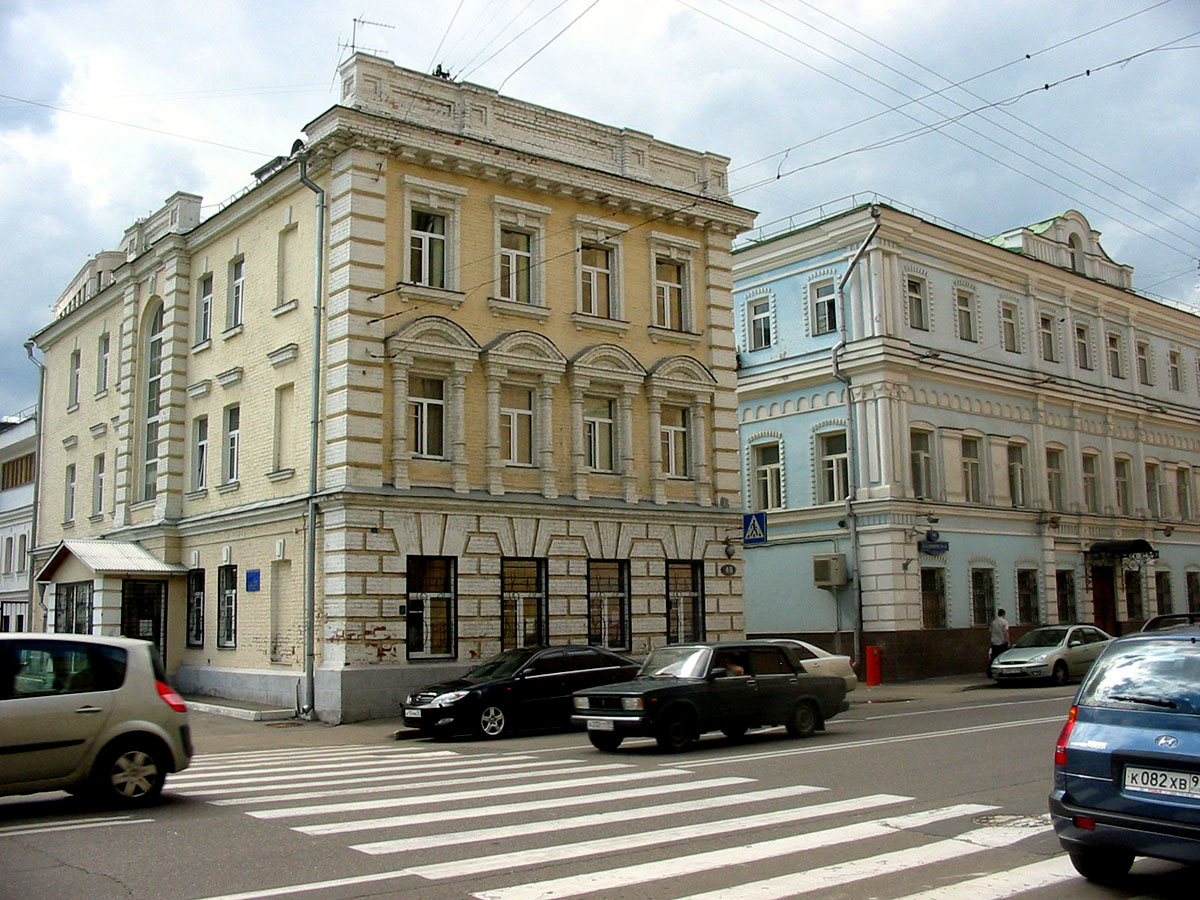
Sadovniki East, Gershwin school of music

Sadovniki East refers to a mixed neighborhood of residential, educational, and industrial buildings on Sadovnicheskaya Street. It retained most of the traditional Zamoskvorechye air. The recent wave of development replaced the old textile mill with a block-sized office compound. Other than that, the 19th-century architecture remains remarkably well preserved. Sadovniki also possess two 1930s memorial buildings, the constructivist Textile Institute (1938) and postconstructivist School 518, recently rebuilt to the original 1935 drafts but in compliance with modern safety rules.

=== Red Hills ===
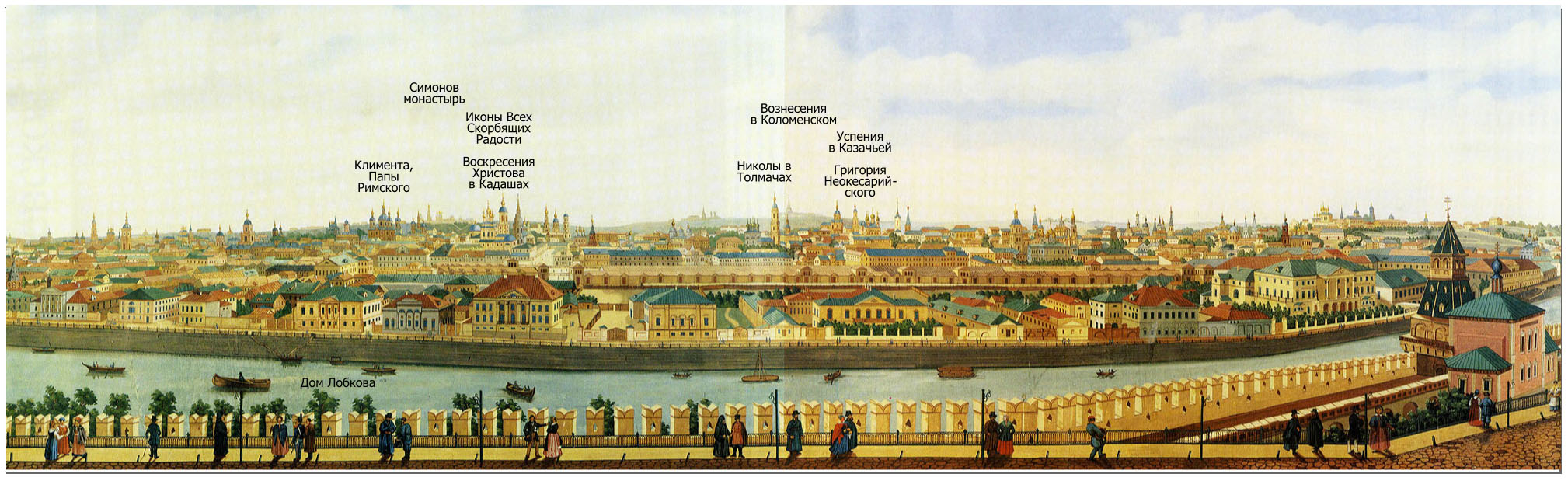
The view of the island from the Moscow Kremlin, an 1850s watercolour

Prior to the 1938 construction of Bolshoy Krasnokholmsky Bridge, Red Hills was separated from the island by a narrow canal running just outside the Garden Ring (see 1853 map). As recently as 15 years ago, the eastern tip of the island was occupied by low-rise industrial buildings, but they were torn down and replaced by offices, a hotel tower (2006), and the Moscow International House of Music (2003).
