= Bolshoy Moskvoretsky Bridge =

Concrete arch bridge in Moscow, Russia

Coordinates: 55°44′56″N 37°37′28″E

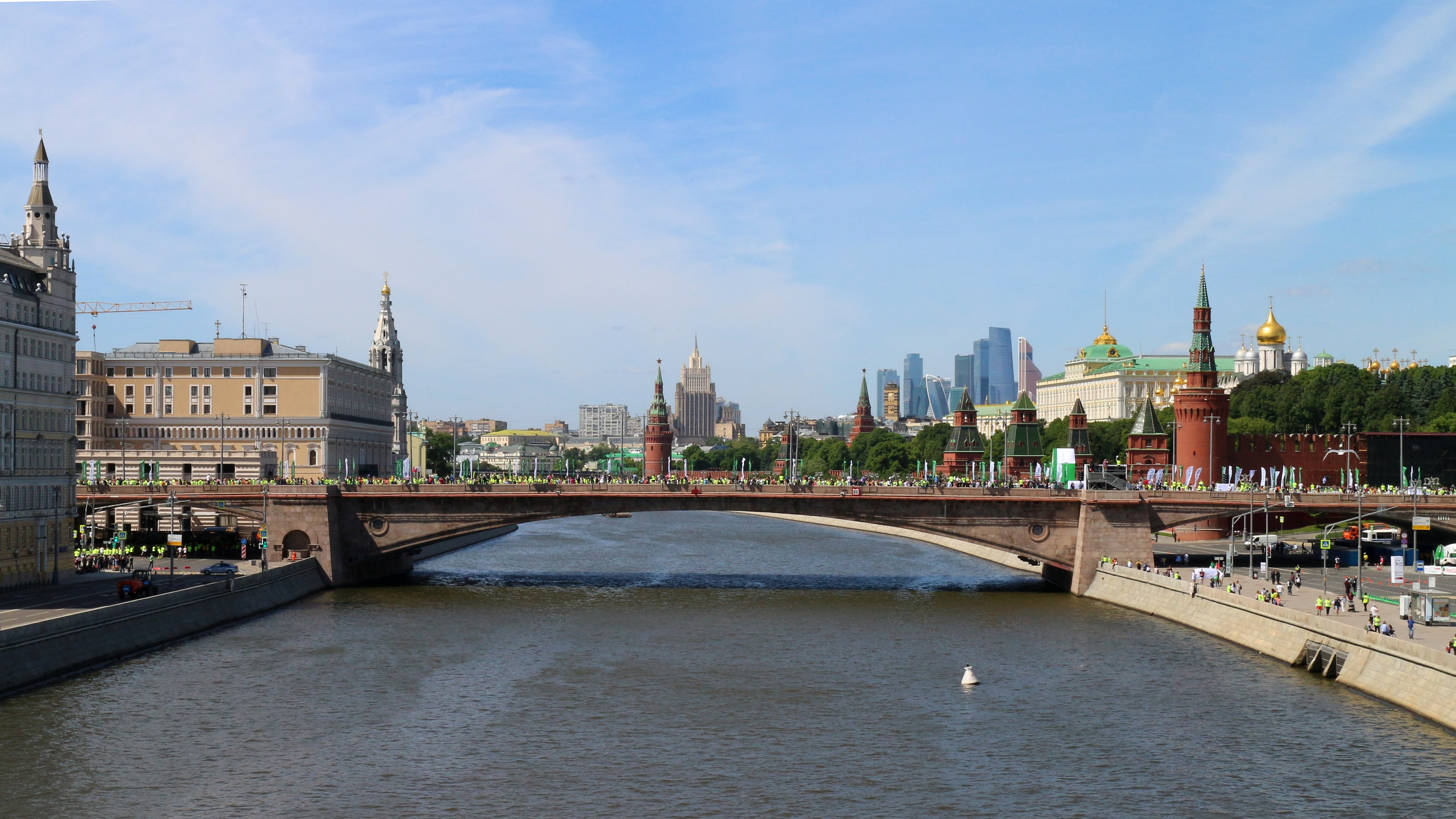
Bolshoy Moskvoretsky Bridge

The Bolshoy Moskvoretsky Bridge (Russian: Большой Москворецкий мост) is a concrete arch bridge that spans the Moskva River in Moscow, Russia, immediately east of the Kremlin. The bridge connects Red Square with Bolshaya Ordynka Street in Zamoskvorechye. Built in 1936–1937, it was designed by V. S. Kirillov (structural engineering) and Alexey Shchusev (architectural design).

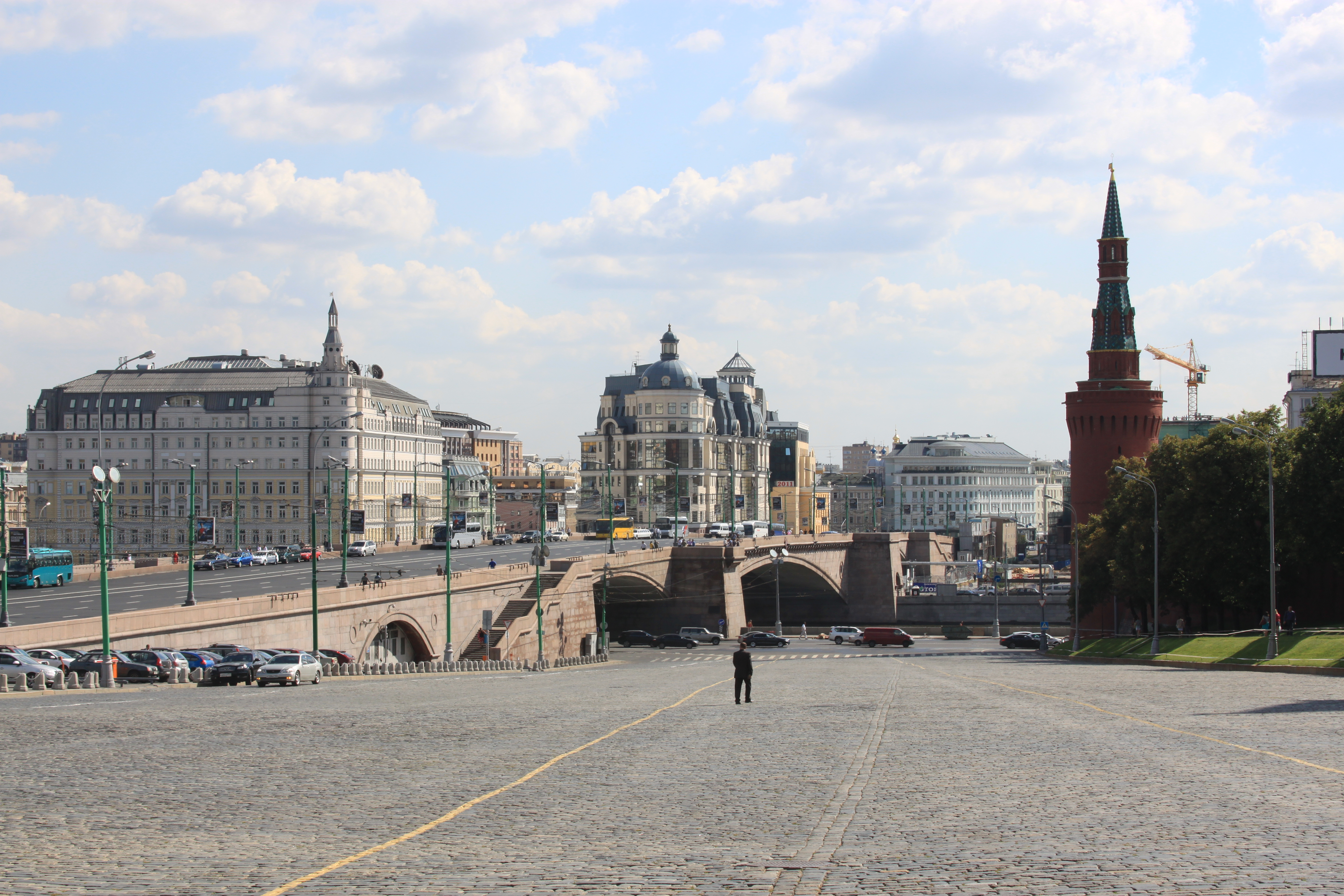
View from the Vasilievsky Spusk (Basil's Descent) to the Bolshoy Moskvoretsky Bridge. (2011)

== Moskvoretsky bridge (1829/1872, demolished) ==
Wooden bridges east of the Kremlin have existed since the fifteenth century, as witnessed by Venetian Ambrogio Contarini, who travelled through Moscow in 1476.

The first permanent Moskvoretsky bridge was built in 1829, about 50 metres (160 ft) west of the present site. Three wooden arches, each 28 metres (92 ft) long, were supported by stone abutments. It was loosely based on Kamennoostrovsky Bridge in Saint Petersburg designed by Agustín de Betancourt. The bridge burned down in 1871; after the fire, steel arches and decking were installed on the old abutments.

== Bolshoy Moskvoretsky bridge (1937) ==
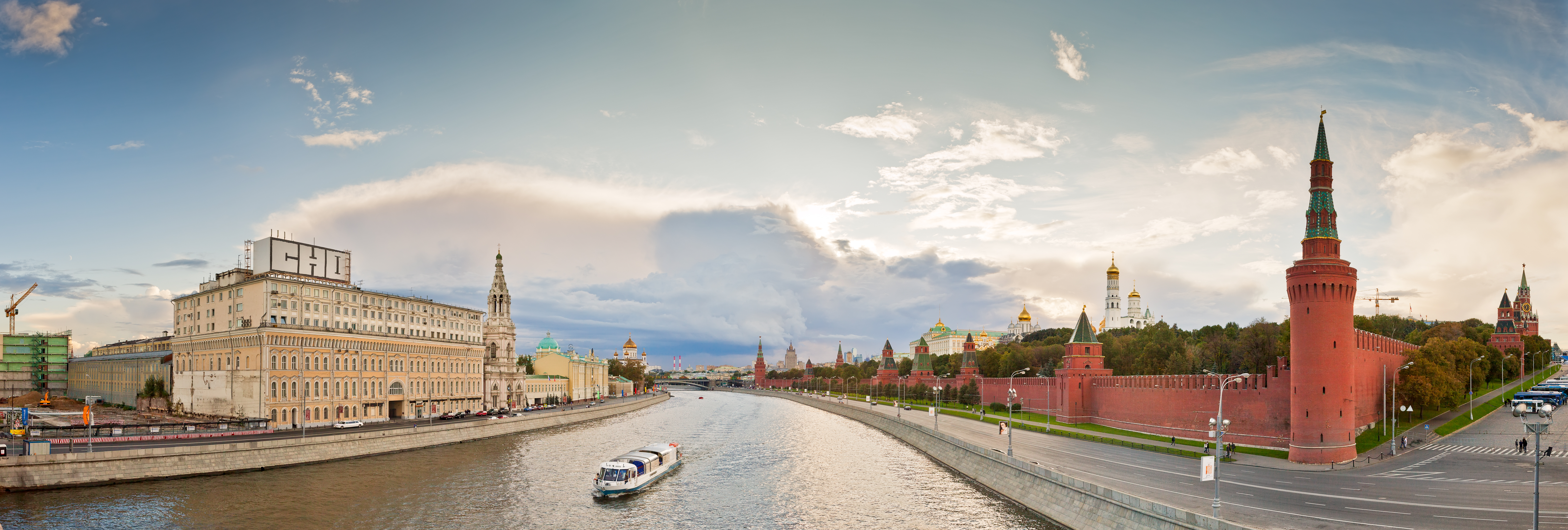
View to Moskva river from Bolshoy Moskvoretsky Bridge

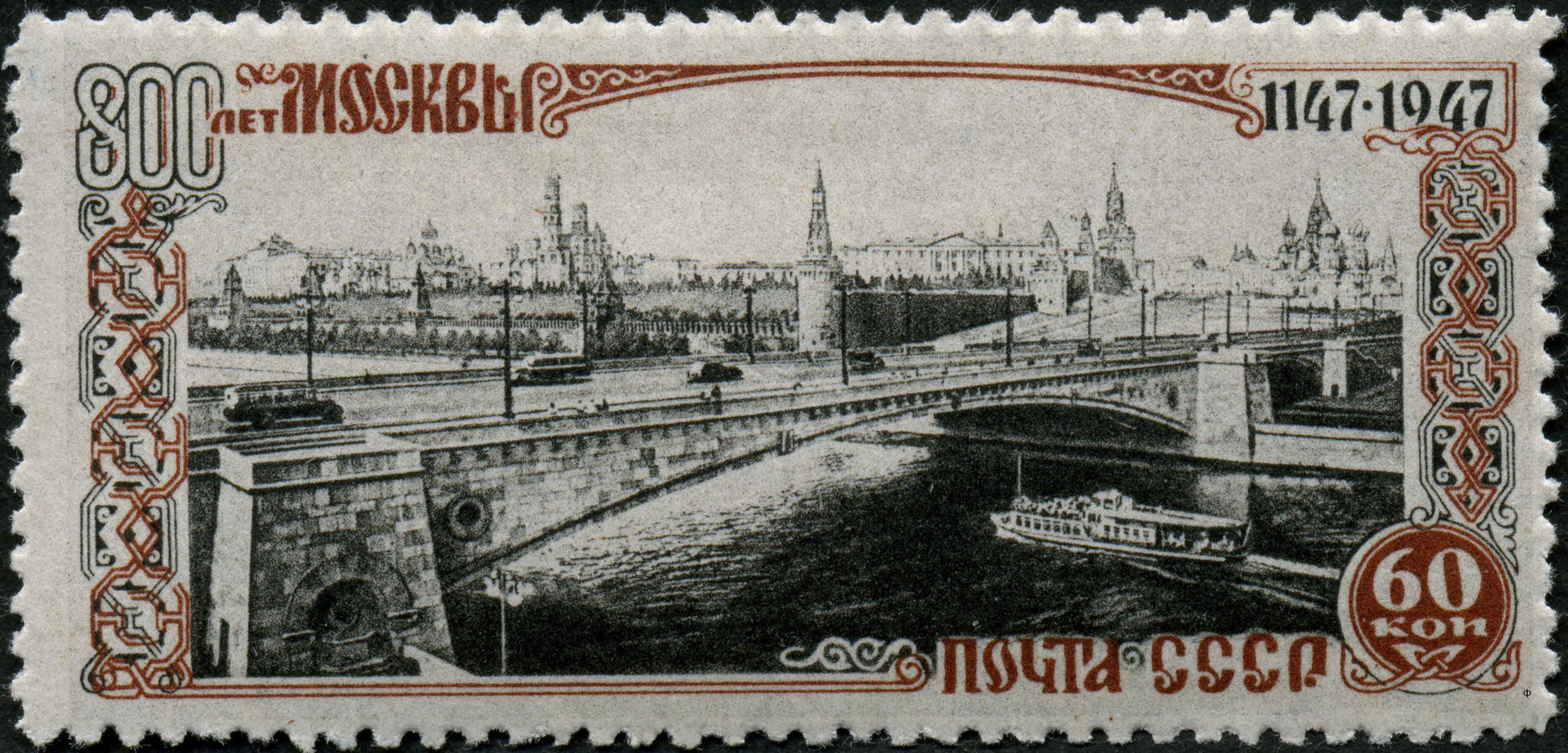
The bridge on a 1947 stamp, marking the 800th anniversary of Moscow's foundation

In 1935–1938, all the bridges in town centre Moscow were replaced with high capacity ones. Moskvoretsky Bridge was the first to be completed, and was the only concrete bridge of the 1930s. The bridge was placed at the narrowest point of the Moskva River, west of its predecessor; as a result, blocks of Zaryadye and Balchug were razed to make way for construction.

The main arch of the current bridge consists of three concrete boxes, 92 metres (302 ft) long and 6.1 metres (20 ft) high. The two arches over the embankments are each 42.8 metres (140 ft) long. The bridge has a total width of 40 metres (130 ft) (8 lanes), and its total length with approach ramps is 554 metres (1,818 ft). Although it is a concrete structure, Alexey Shchusev finished the bridge in pink granite slabs to create the illusion that the bridge is actually built in stone.

== Notable events ==
On 27 May 1987 German aviator Mathias Rust landed on the bridge.

On 27 February 2015 opposition politician Boris Nemtsov was shot to death while crossing this bridge.

== Bibliography ==
- Носарев, В. А.; Скрябина, Т. А. (2004). Мосты Москвы [Bridges of Moscow] (in Russian). Moscow: Вече. pp. 94–101. ISBN 5-9533-0183-9. OCLC 57465831.

== See also ==
- List of bridges in Moscow

== Image Gallery ==
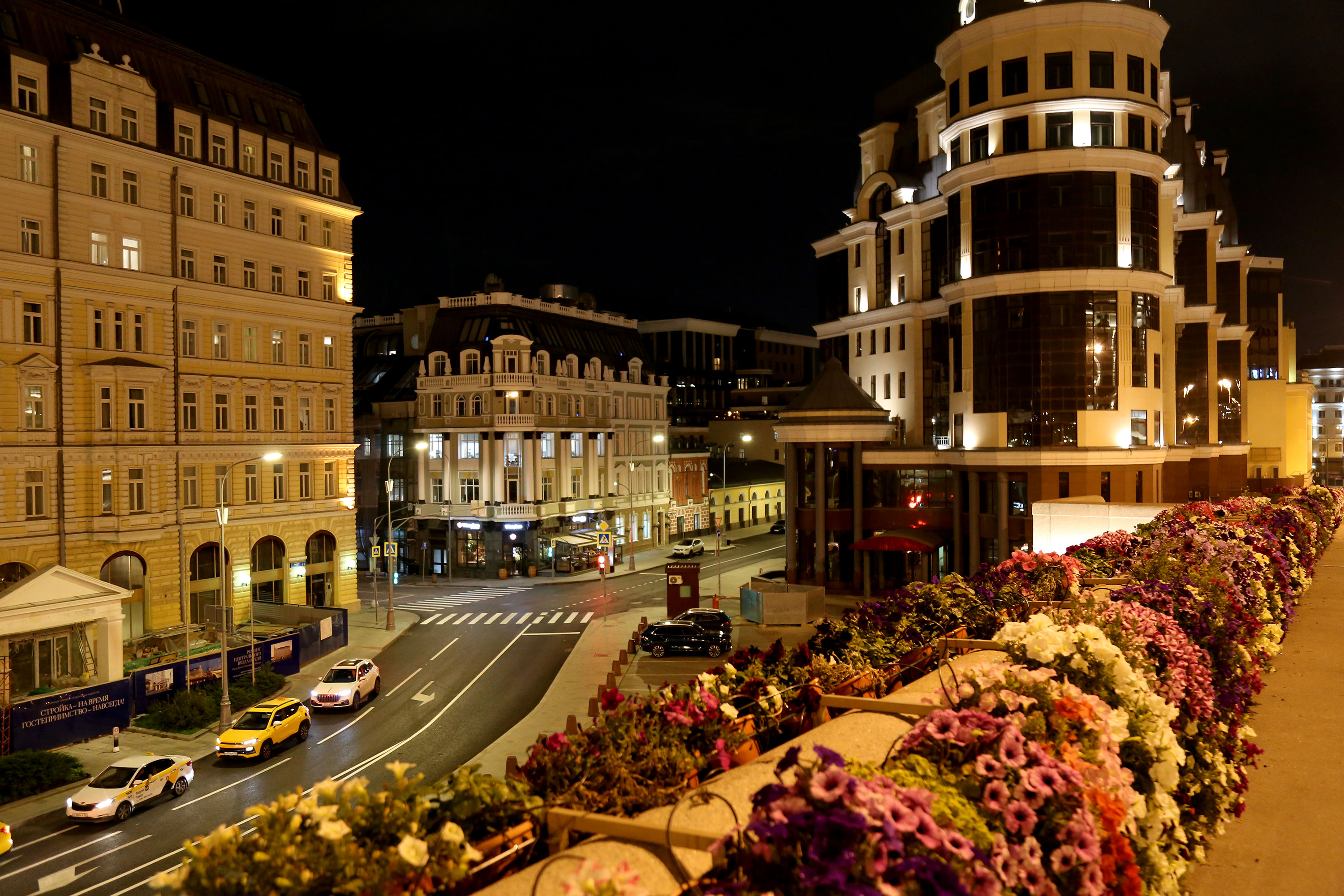
Bolshoy Moskvoretsky Bridge, Moscow, Russia

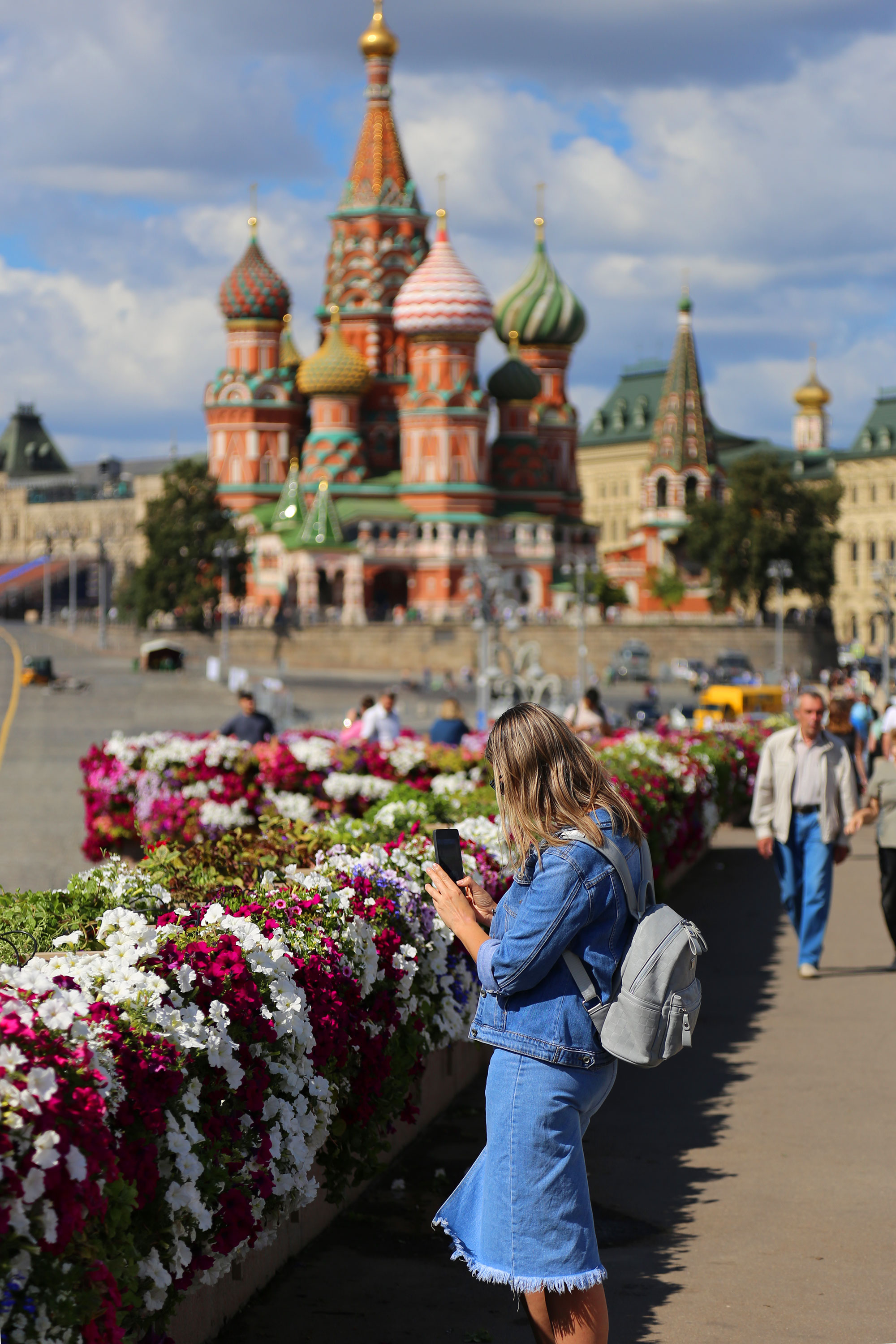
Bolshoy Moskvoretsky Bridge, Moscow, Russia

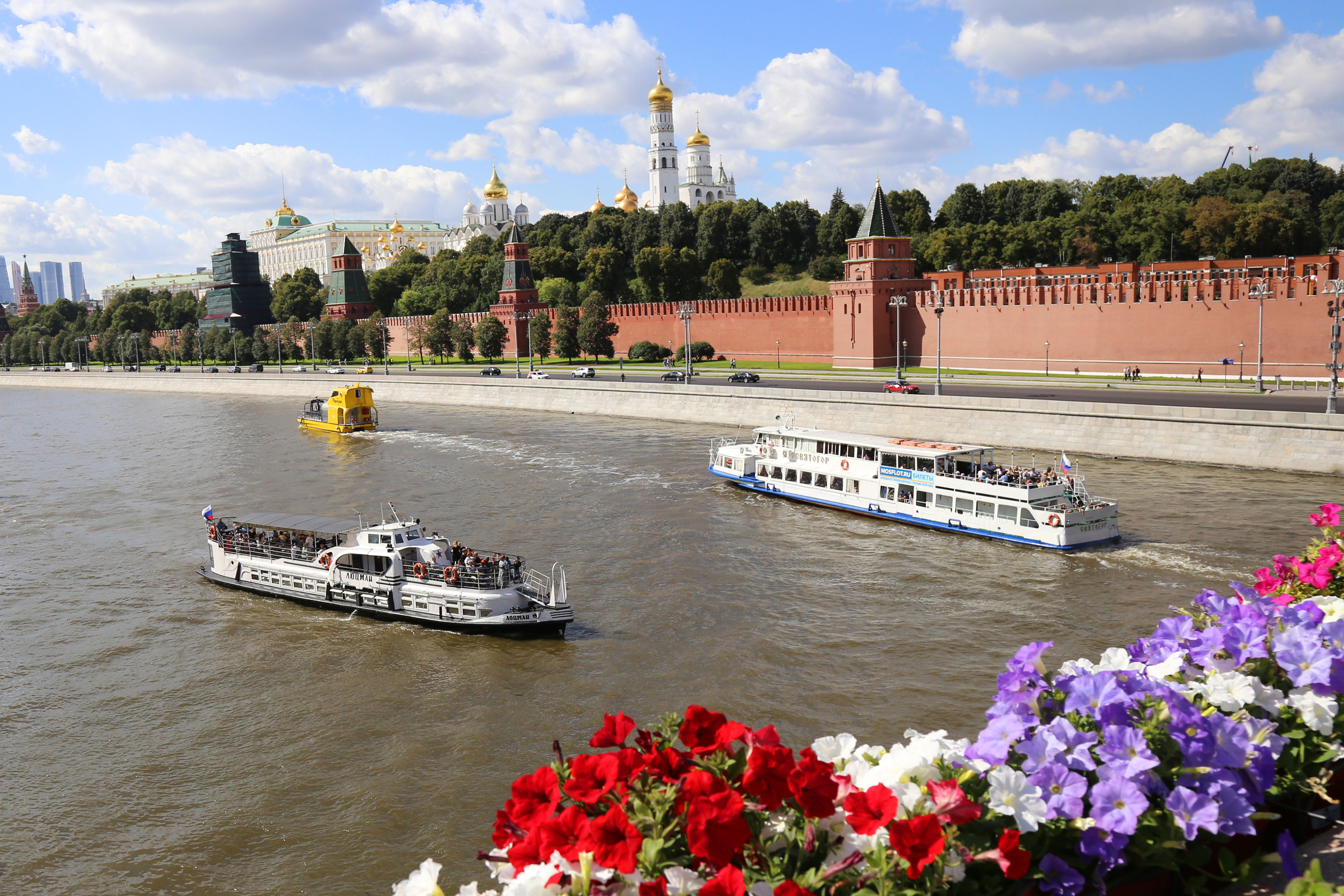
Bolshoy Moskvoretsky Bridge, Moscow, Russia

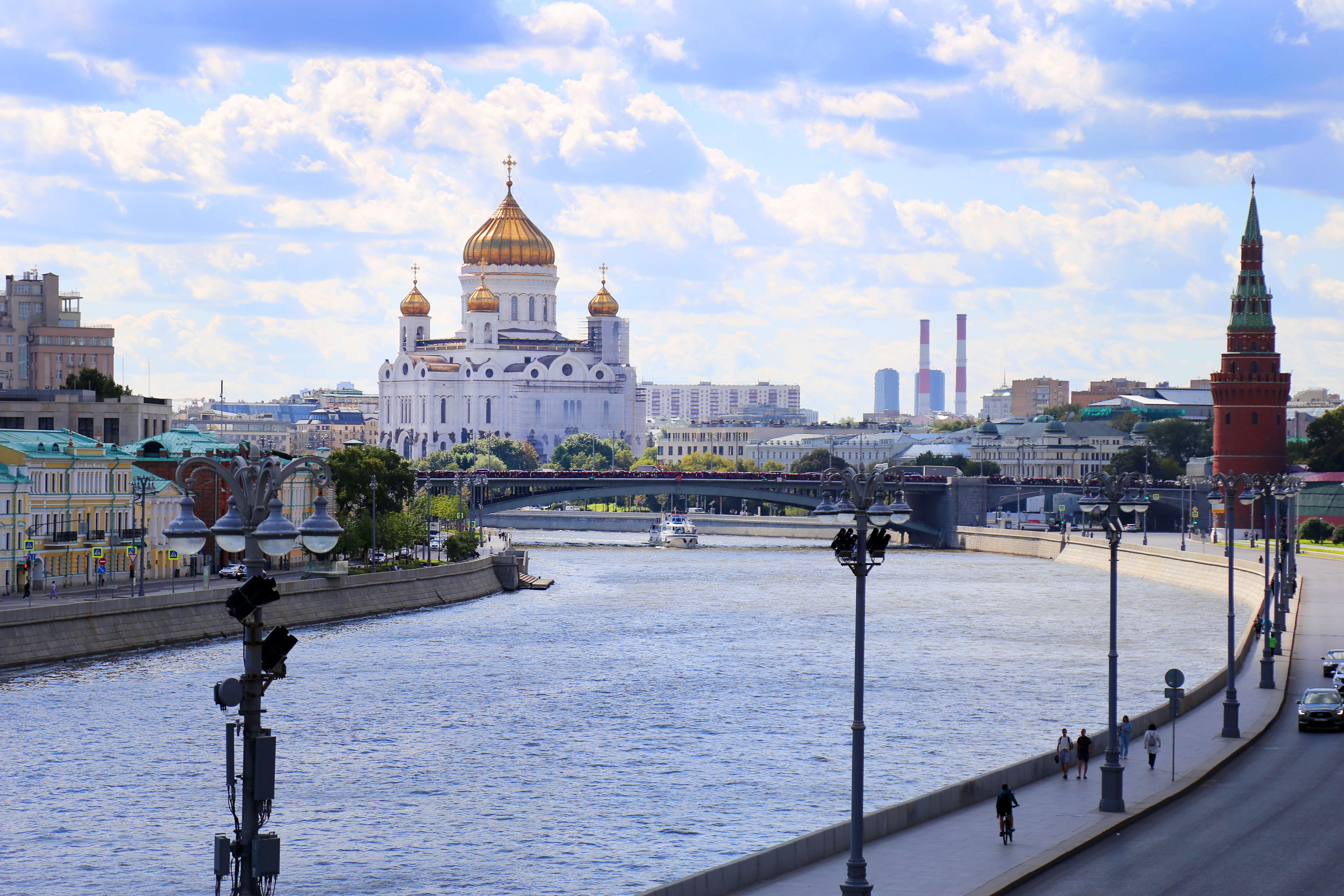
Bolshoy Moskvoretsky Bridge, Moscow, Russia

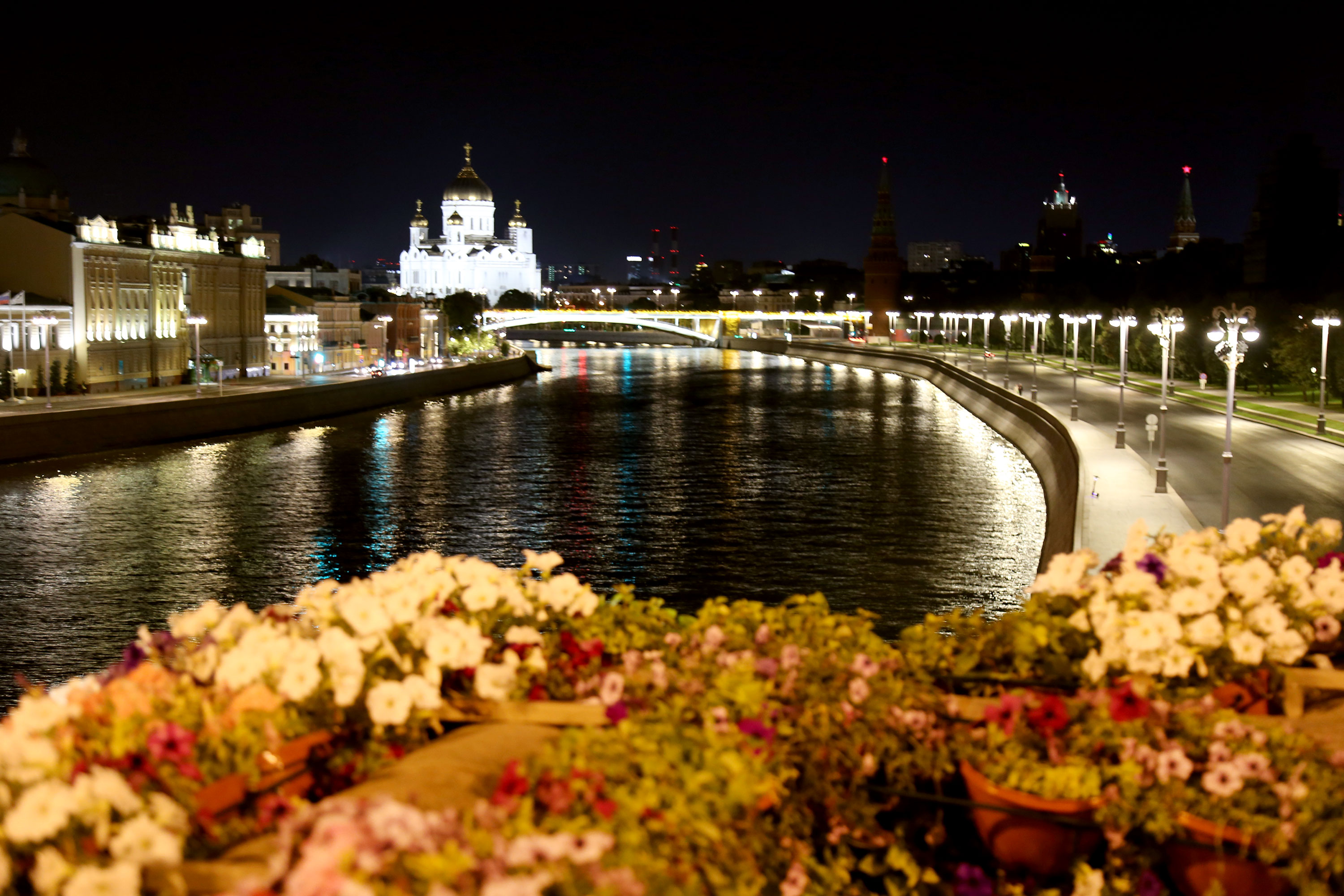
Bolshoy Moskvoretsky Bridge, Moscow, Russia
