= Zaryadye =

Historical district in Moscow

Coordinates: 55.7513°N 37.629°E

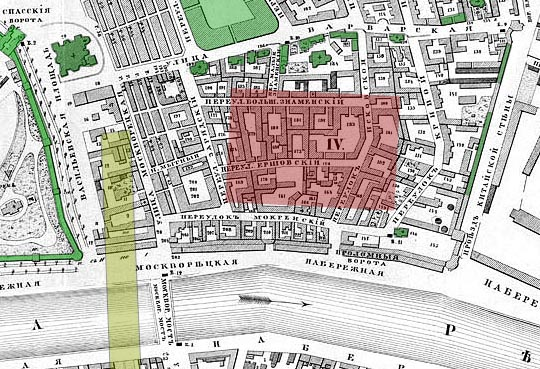
1853 map of Zaryadye Green: surviving structures Red: Rossia Hotel Yellow: Moskvoretsky Bridge

Zaryadye (Russian: Зарядье, IPA: [zɐˈrʲædʲje]) is a historical district in Moscow established in the 12th or 13th century within Kitai-gorod, between Varvarka Street and the Moskva River. The name means "the place behind the rows", i.e., behind the market rows adjacent to Red Square.

== History ==
Zaryadye is the oldest trading settlement outside the Kremlin walls. The first chronicle notice is dated 1365, when a fire destroyed the area. Fires continued in 1390, 1468, 1493, 1547; in 1451, the fire was set by Tatar raiders. Zaryadye's Main Street (Великая улица), later called Mokrinsky Lane (Мокринский переулок), connected Kremlin with the docks and warehouses on Moskva River; some sources call it the first street of Moscow outside Kremlin walls.

In 1536–1538, the walls of Kitai-gorod fortress separated Zaryadye from the river; access to the river was possible only through the gates in the south-western and south-eastern corners of the neighborhood. The businesses changed their logistics pattern, walking away from river trade to supplies by land. The population of traders became more and more diluted by craftsmen and court servants.

Peter I's reforms struck two blows at Zaryadye. Firstly, when the court relocated to Saint Petersburg, the area lost tenants, and many businesses closed. Secondly, Peter's rampart, built between Kitai-gorod wall and the river, closed all the sewage moats, trapping all the waste inside Zaryadye. For at least a century, Zaryadye became an unhealthy and unsafe social bottom of Moscow.

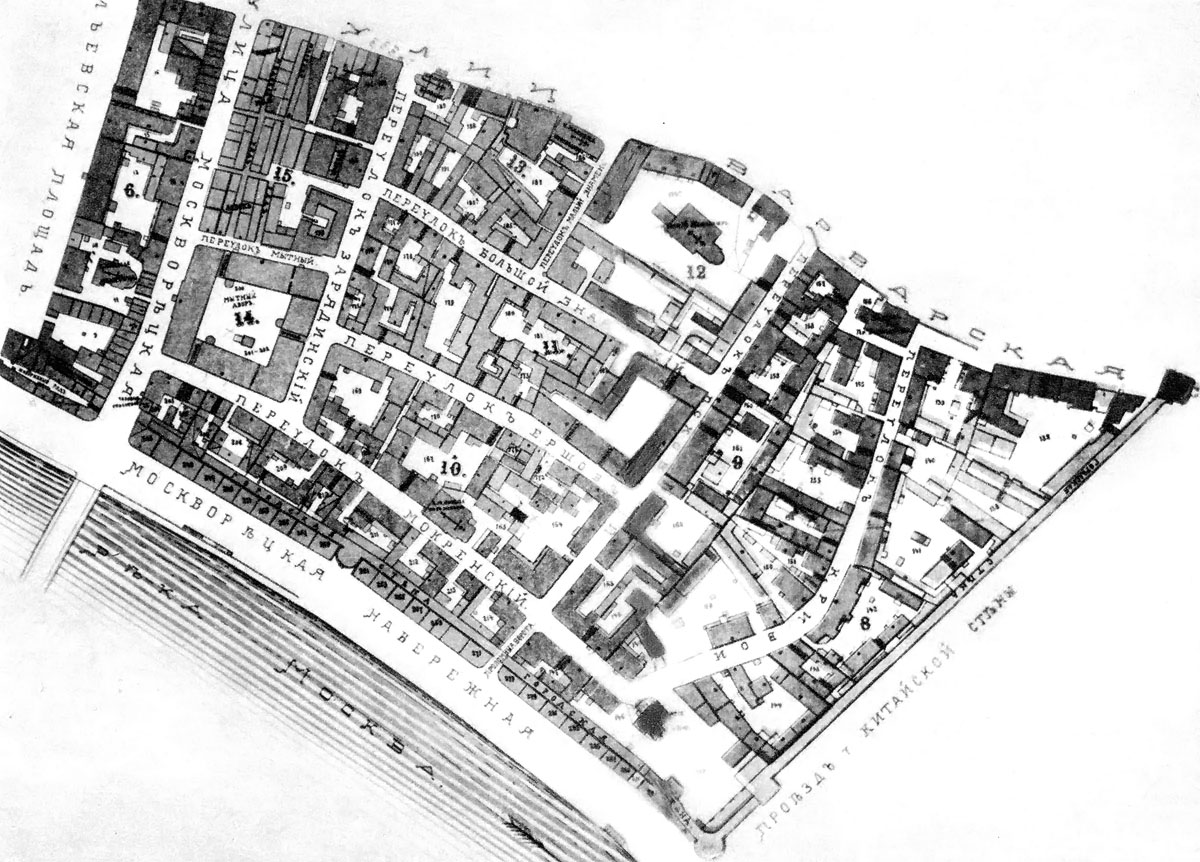
Zaryadye map in 1881

Things improved after the fire of 1812. The State, fearing future fires, banned all wooden construction. Poorer landlords of Zaryadye could not afford stone buildings and sold their properties. They were purchased by real estate developers, who quickly converted Zaryadye into an area of cheap rental housing, usually two or three stories high. For nearly a century, Zaryadye was the location of Moscow's garment industry, a backyard of the wealthy Kitai-gorod.

Since 1826, Glebovskoye Podvorye (Глебовское подворье), an inn in Zaryadye, was the hub of Moscow's Jewish community. Jews were allowed free settlement in the city in 1856, and preferred settling nearby, in Zaryadye. By 1891, Moscow housed an estimated 35,000 Jews, at least half of them settled in Zaryadye (the first synagogue opened in 1891 two blocks north-east).

After 1918, with the collapse of traditional small businesses due to the October Revolution, Zaryadye tenants relocated to the remote workers' neighborhoods. The properties were taken over by state offices.

== Destruction ==
The 1935 Soviet master plan of Moscow called for demolition of Zaryadye, clearing space for the Industry Building (Narkomtiazhprom) and its riverside ramps. This project did not materialize as planned.

The first round of destruction (1936) cleared the blocks adjacent to Moscow Kremlin for the ramps of Bolshoy Moskvoretsky Bridge.

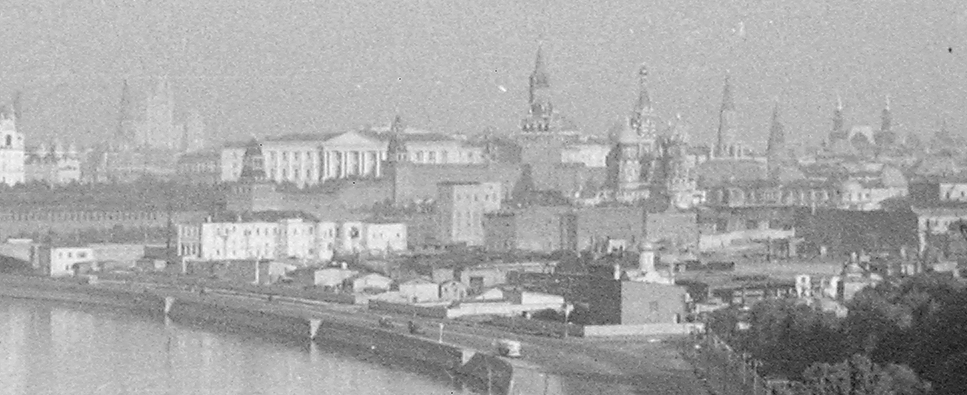
Zaryadie in 1959, seen from south-east

This was followed by the destruction of most of Zaryadye in 1947, clearing the ground for the skyscraper designed by Dmitry Chechulin. This project was cancelled at the foundation stage. A 1947 postcard shows that, in addition to the existing row of churches on Varvarka Street, this round of demolition spared the 2-story buildings on Moskvoretskaya Street, right next to the bridge, and the Kitai-gorod wall facing the river. According to P. V. Sytin, the historical church of St. Anna and other relics had to be disassembled and rebuilt in the Kolomenskoye park; this did not materialize. The site was left vacant for over 15 years.

A third round, in the 1960s, cleared these buildings near the bridge. In 1967, the Rossiya Hotel was built on this site. The demolition of the hotel was completed in 2007 and a new urban park, Zaryadye Park, was opened on the site of the former hotel in 2017.

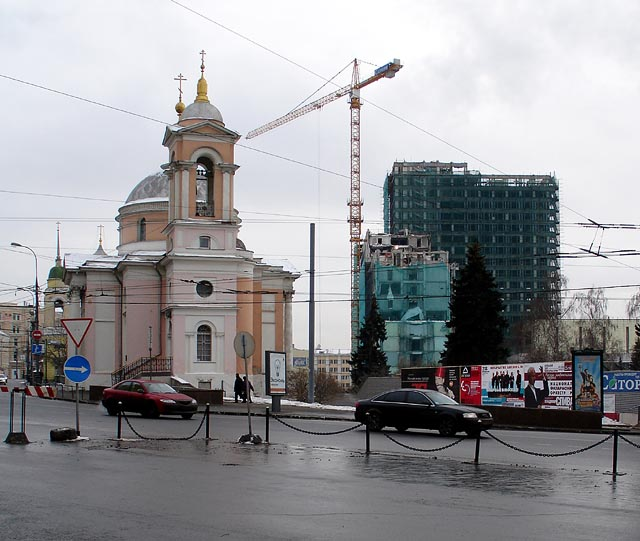
Dismantling of Rossiya, February 3, 2007

== Historical legacy ==
Spared historical buildings include:

- Cathedral of the Sign (1679–84)
- Church of All Saints (1610s)
- St. George Church on Pskov Hill (1657)
- St. Maksim Church (1698)
- St. Anna's Church at the Corner (1510s)
- St. Barbara Church (1796–1804)
- The Old English Embassy (1550s)
- 16th-century Romanov boyar residence
- Two fragments of Kitai-gorod wall on the western edge of a lot

== Gallery ==
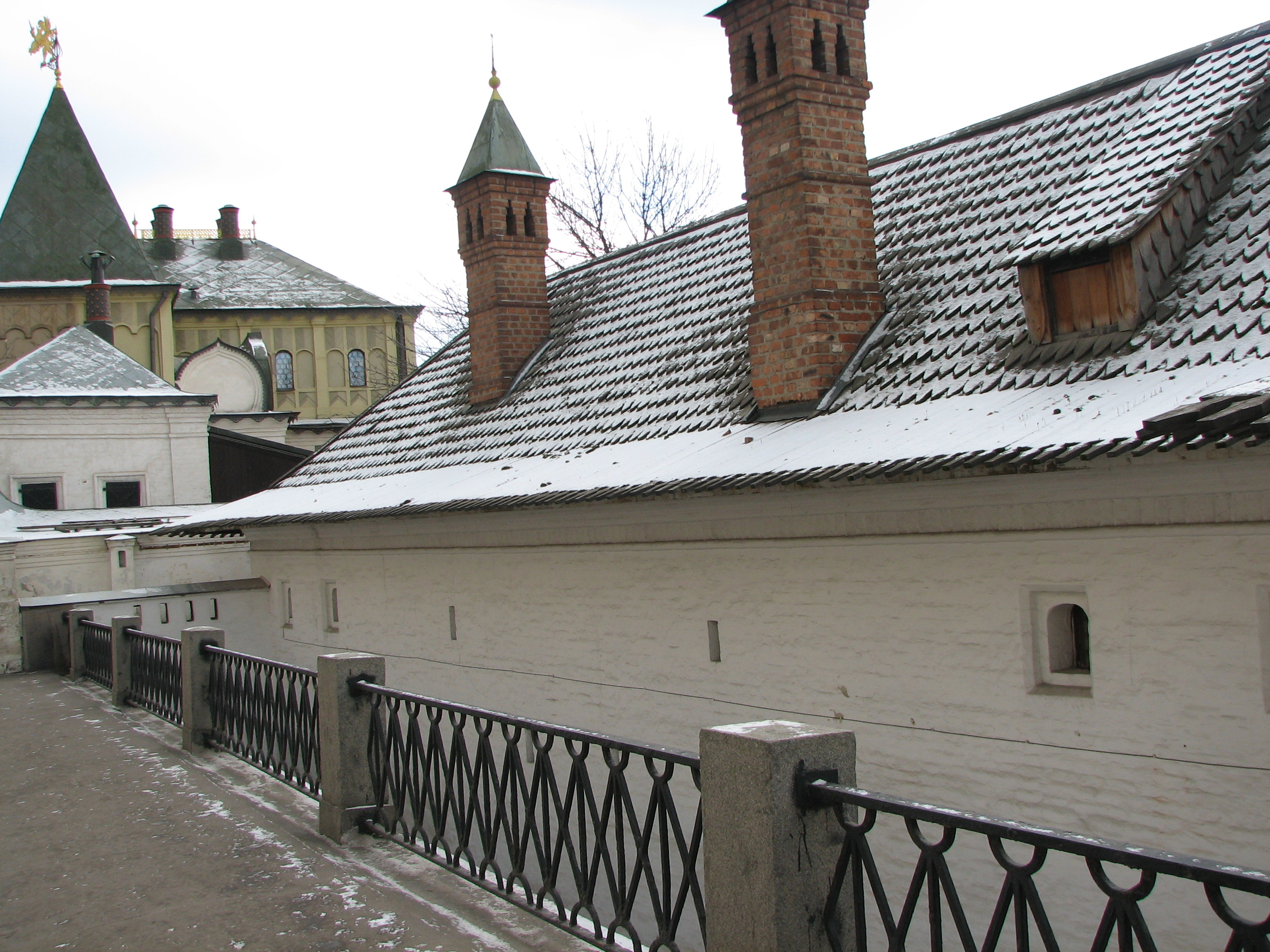
16th-century Romanov boyar residence

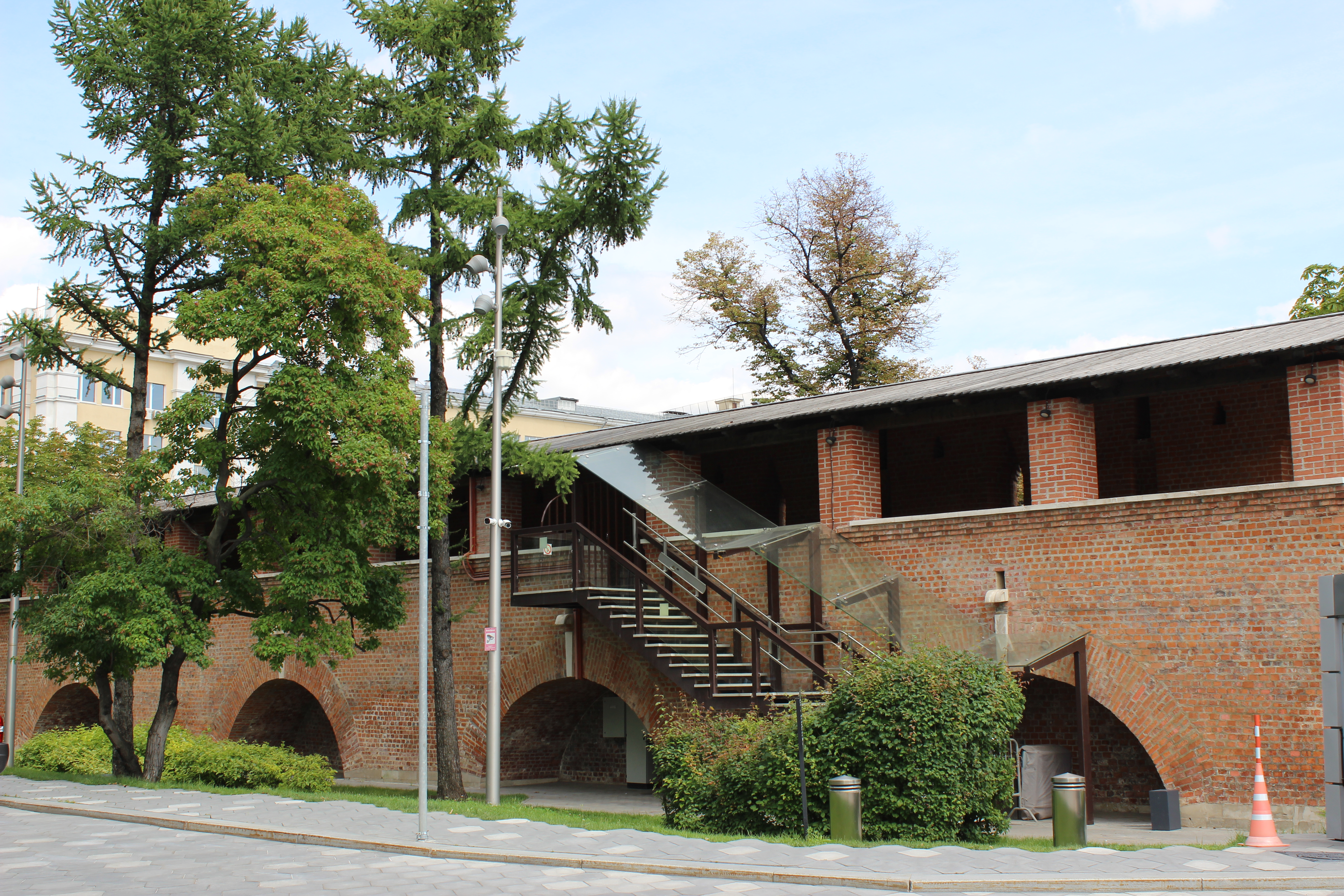
The only surviving part of Kitai-gorod's Wall

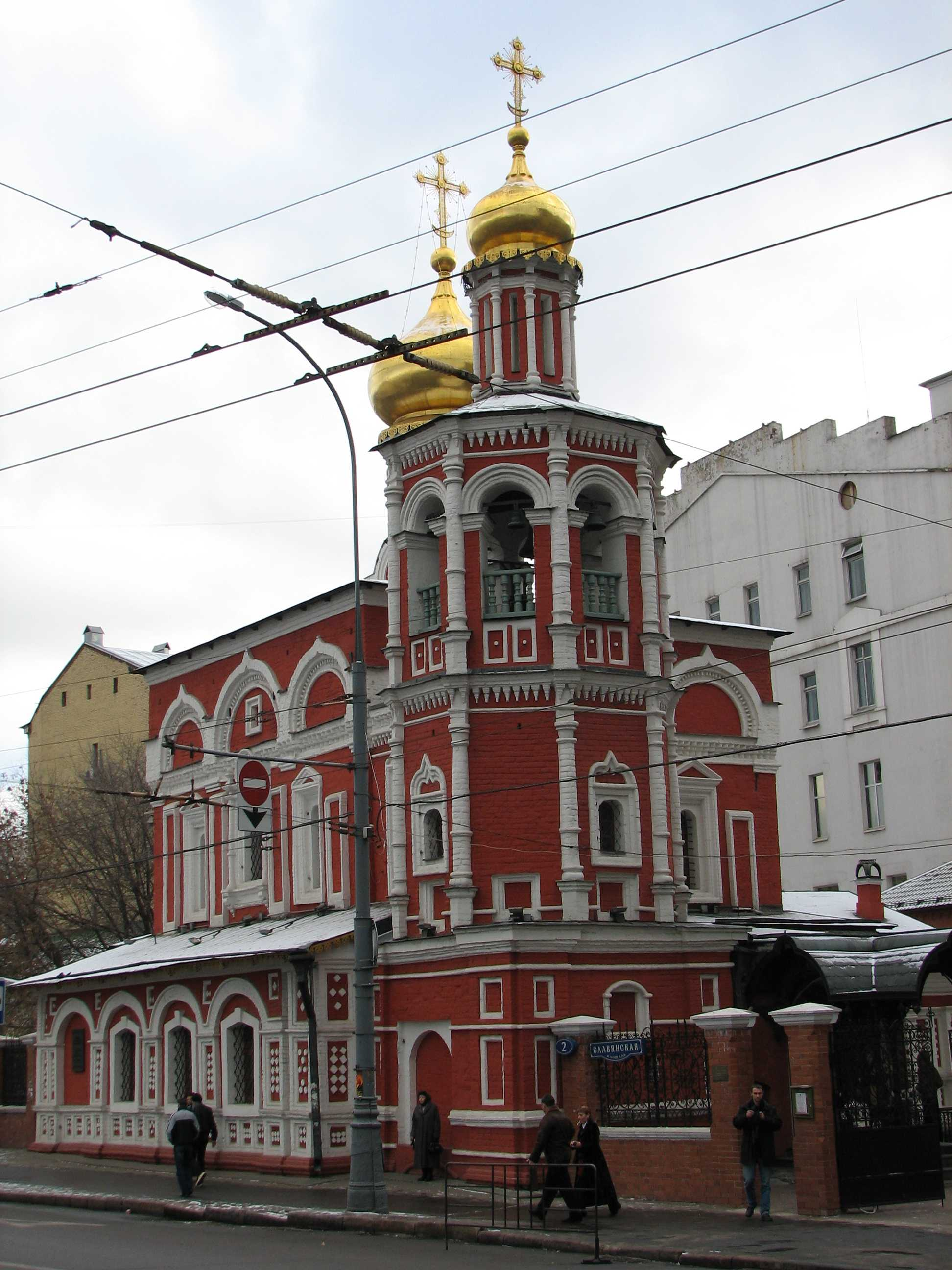
Church of All Saints

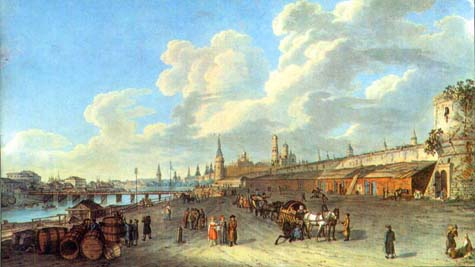
View of the wall of Kitai-Gorod and the Zaryadye from the embankment of the Moskva River, 1796

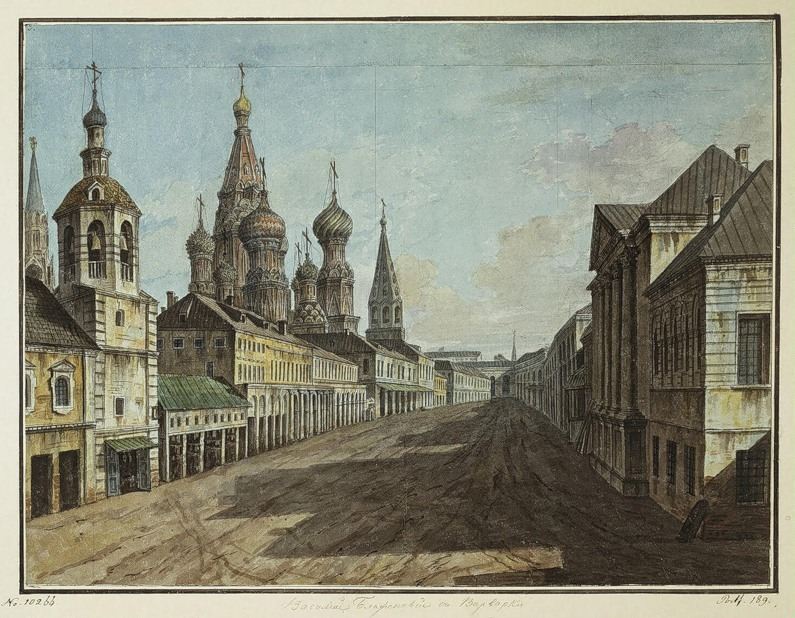
Moskvoretskaya Street c. 1800. By Fedor Alexeev

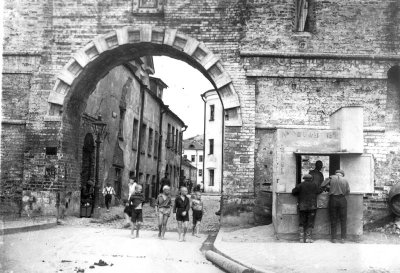
Break-gate of Kitai-gorod wall of Zaryadye, 1934

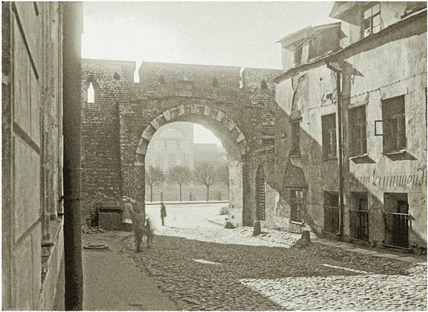
Break-gate of Kitai-gorod wall of Zaryadye, 1934

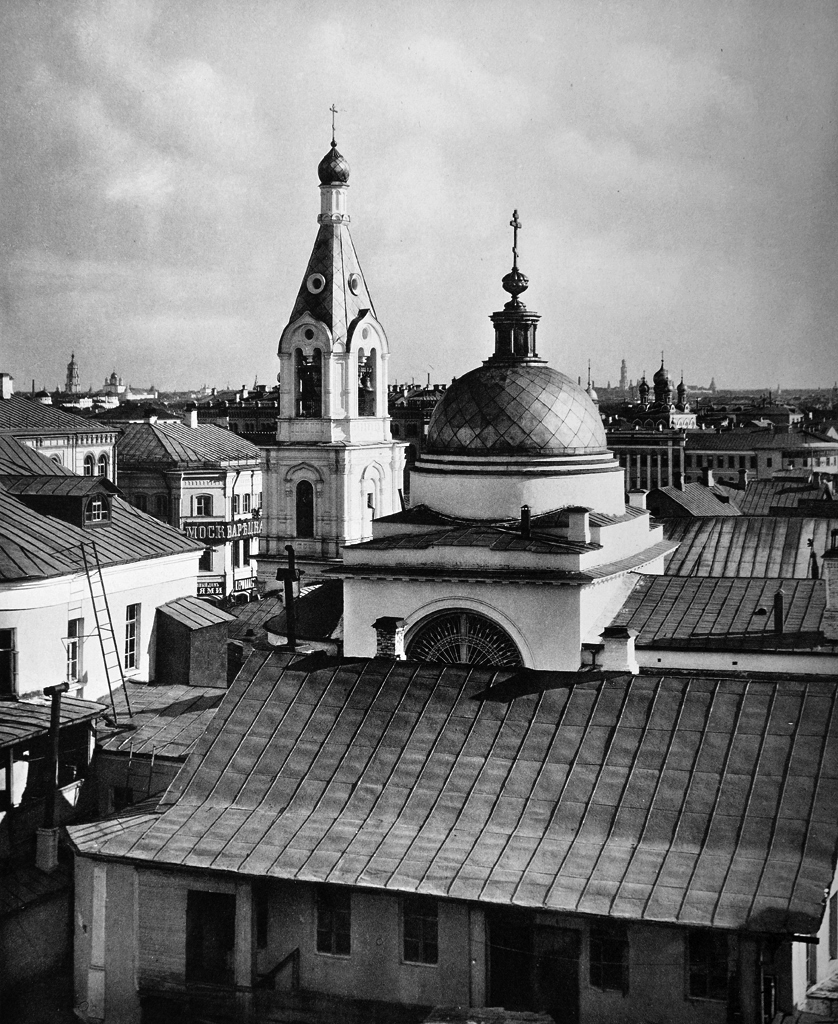
Church of St. Nicholas "Moskvoretsky" (destroyed) in the Zaryadye, 1900

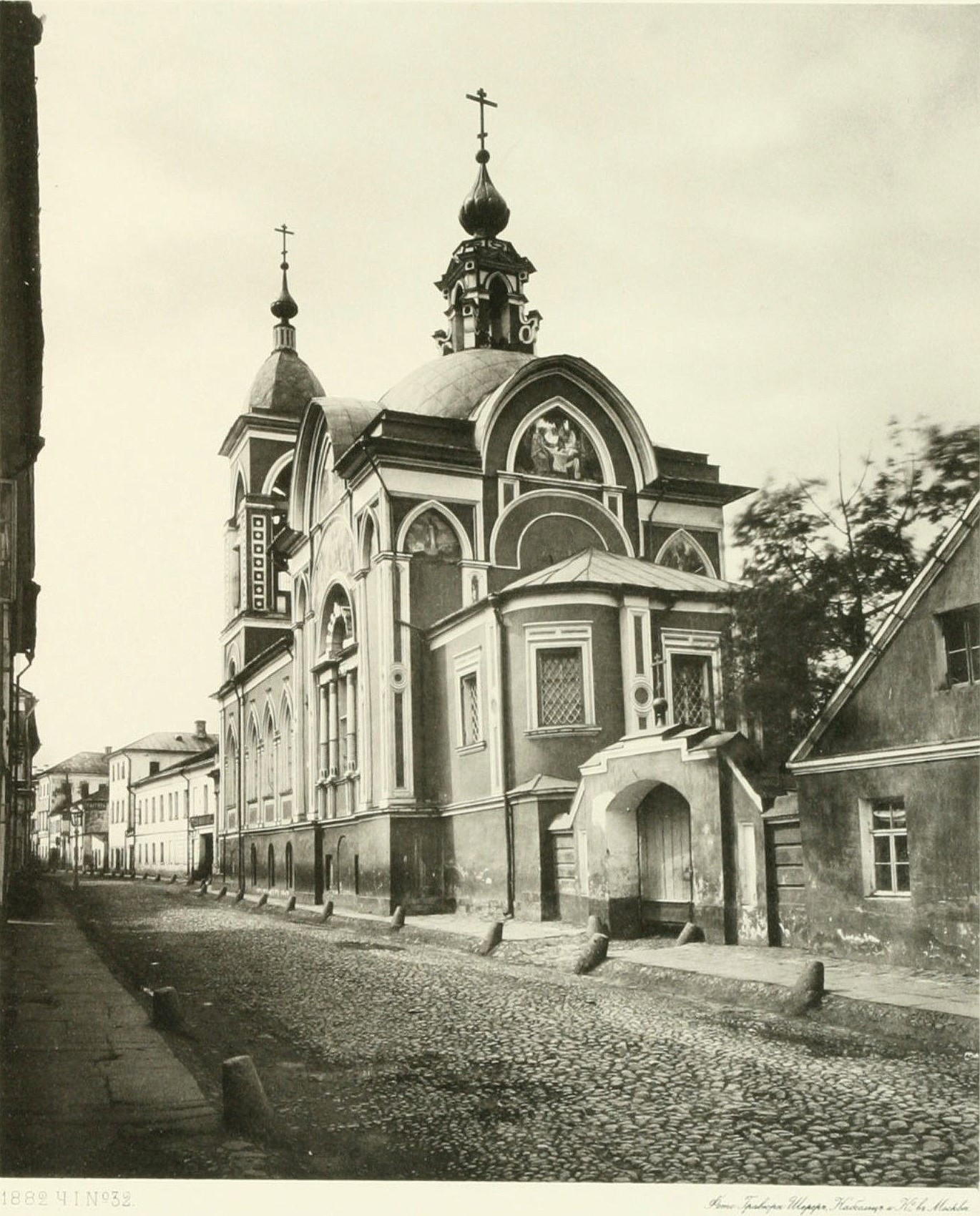
Church of St. Nicholas "Wet" (destroyed) in the Zaryadye, 19th century

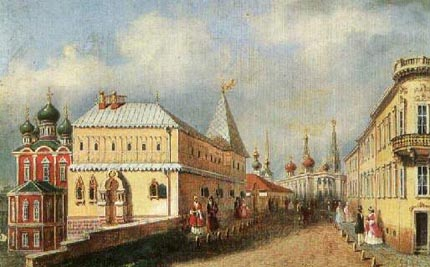
Varvarka Street and Zaryadye with the Chambers of the Romanov boyars in the 19th century

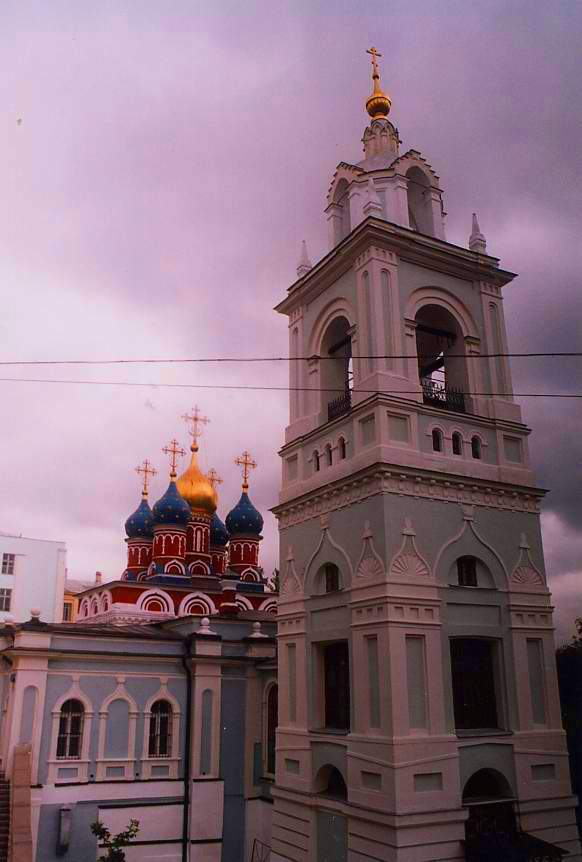
St. George Church on Pskov Hill (1657)

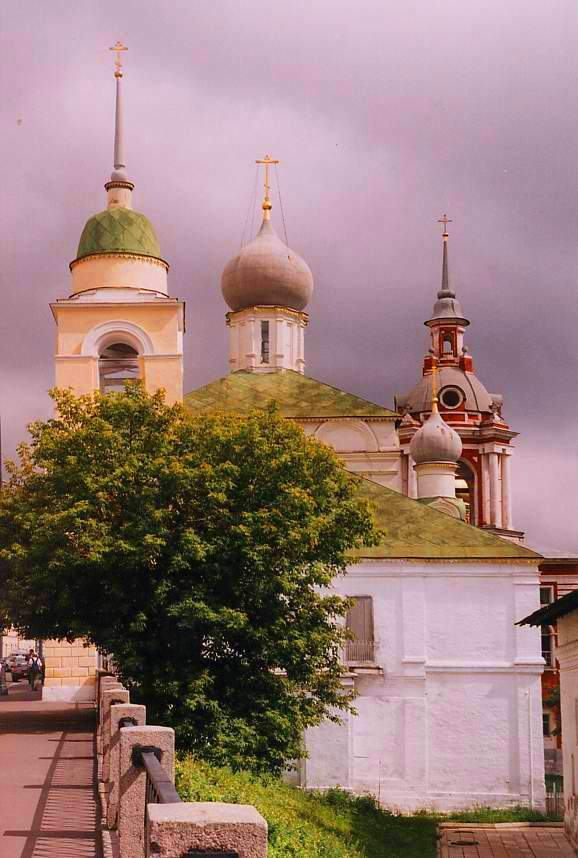
St. Maksim Church (1698)

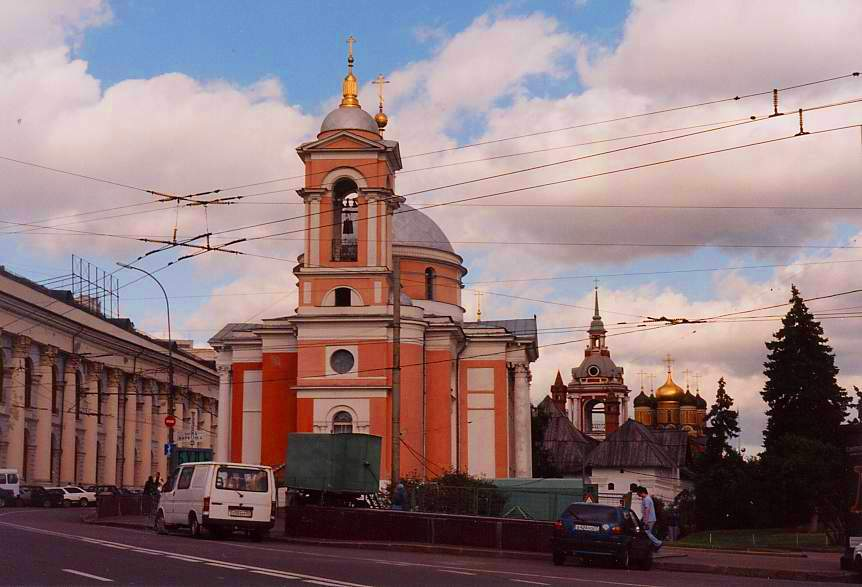
St. Barbara Church (1796–1804)

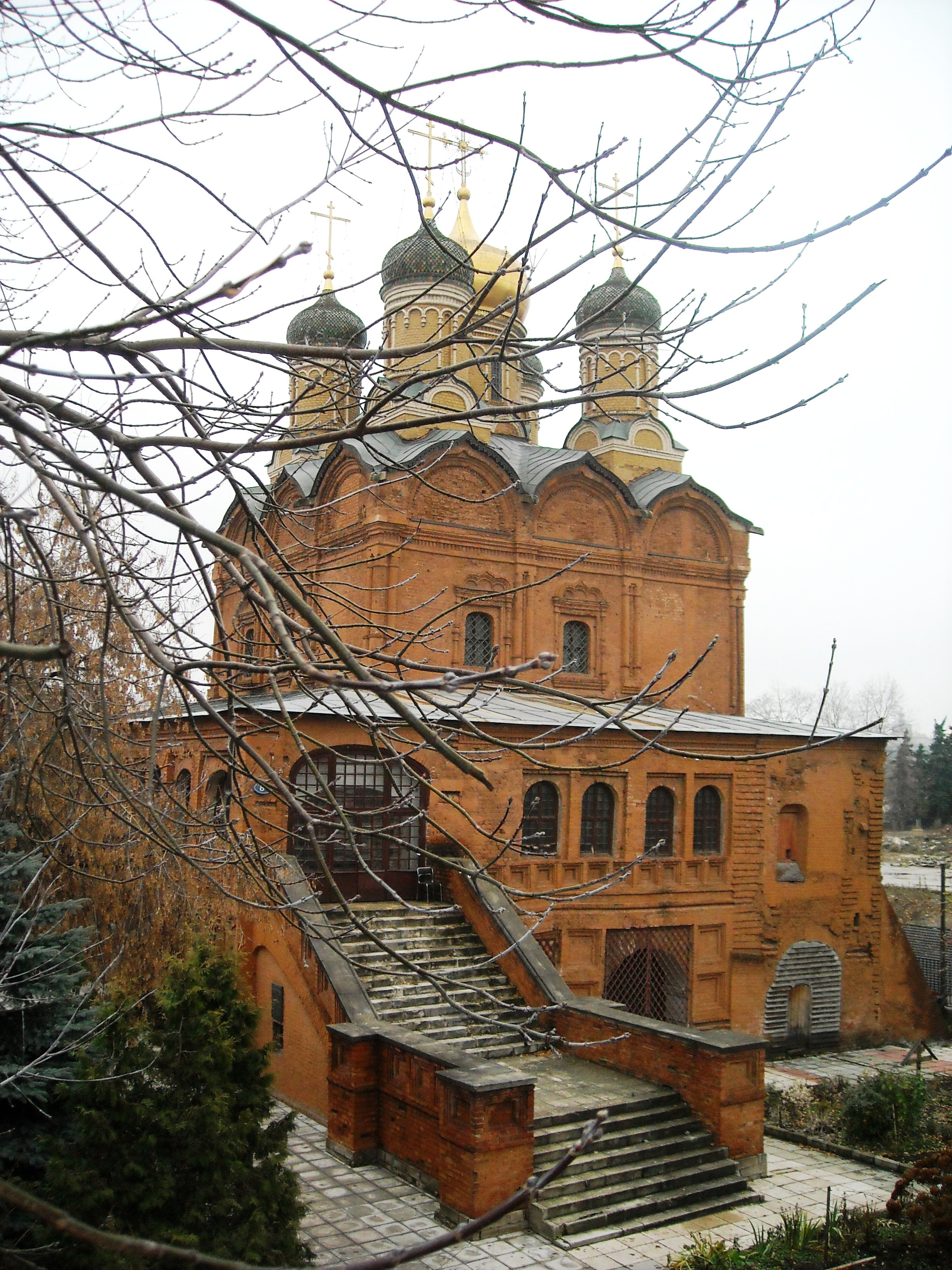
Cathedral of the Sign (1679–84)
