= Bolshoy Krasnokholmsky Bridge =

Bridge in Moscow, Russia

Coordinates: 55°44′12″N 37°38′49″E

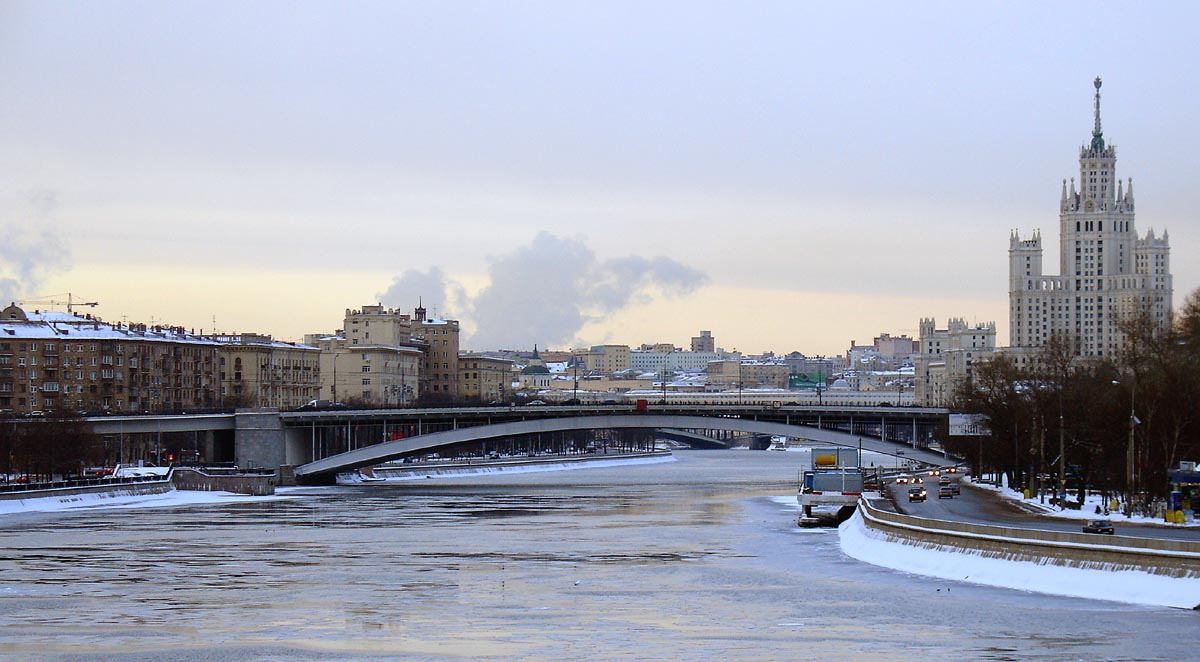
Bolshoy Krasnokholmsky Bridge, view from south-east

Bolshoy Krasnokholmsky Bridge (Russian: Большо́й Краснохо́лмский мост) is a steel arch bridge that spans Moskva River in downtown Moscow, Russia, carrying Garden Ring between Tagansky District and Zamoskvorechye Districts. It was completed in 1938 by V.M.Vakhurkin (structural engineering), G.P.Golts and D.M.Sobolev (architectural design). Its main span is the widest arch span in Moscow (168 meters).

== History ==
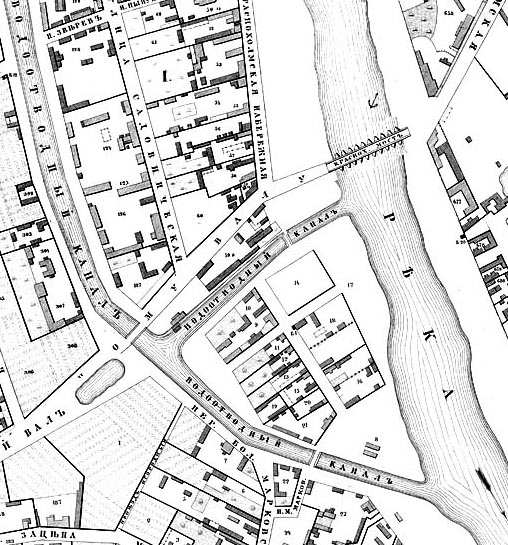
Site of Krasnokholmsky Bridges, 1853, from Khotev's Atlas. Note the channel separating Red Hills (triangular island) and the angle of bridge across Moskva River

Wooden causeway bridges on this site were common since 18th century; 1853 plan shows a wooden bridge on site slightly to the south of current site and at a different angle. Originally, Vodootvodny Canal has a second bypass canal, cutting off the south-eastern tip of The Island. It was located roughly 100 meters south from the centerline of present-day Garden Ring, spanned by one or two wooden bridges. All bridges, past and present, were built to the north of this bypass canal.

The first permanent Krasnoholmsky Bridge across Moskva River was built in 1872, by the Struwe brothers; Amand Struwe was lead engineer and financial promoter. The bridge consisted of two rectangular lattice trusses (a mixed truss and girder type), each 65.5 meters long, with a single main pillar in the middle. Usable deck had 15.0 meters wide roadway with timber paving plus two 2.14 meter wide foot walkways. Tram tracks were laid later; a 1910 plan denotes tham as horse-tram service, 1916 plan - as electrical tram. Struwe, like his predecessors, built his bridge at nearly right angle to river flow - with an unnecessary kink in the path of Garden Ring.

== Bolshoy Krasnokholmsky Bridge (1938) ==
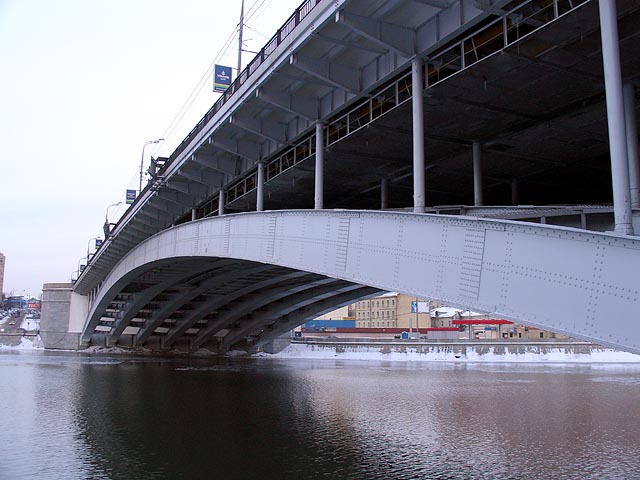
Bolshoy Krasnokholmsky Bridge, close view, after reconstruction (2007)

The new bridge was designed to eliminate this kink, so the bridge-to-river angle is 55 degrees. Initially, planners considered a cable-stayed scheme, but a combination of cable scheme and a sharp angle seemed too risky, so they reverted to conventional arch design. Main span consists of seven sickle-shaped steel arches, each 168 meters long and 10.68 meters high. They are made of SDS steel (Специальная Дворца Советов, Palace of Soviets Special). Total steel consumption for the main span (with deck) is 6000 metric tons, or 890 kilograms per square meter of deck.

Shoreside pylons, finished in granite slabs, are based on four concrete caisson foundations (each 35.6 by 15.0 meters) reaching the solid limestone slab which is 11.5-13.0 meters deep at this point. Total length of bridge, with concrete approach ramps, is 725.5 meters, width 40.0 meters (8 traffic lanes, which originally included two tram tracks).

In 2005–2007, the bridge went through a major overhaul. Deck and approach ramps (excluding their side walls) were torn apart and replaced. Visually, bridge retained all original structural details.

== See also ==
- List of bridges in Moscow
