= Eighth Sister =

Planned high-rise building in Moscow

Coordinates: 55°45′05″N 37°37′44″E

The Eighth Sister is the unbuilt project for a skyscraper in Zaryadye, Moscow. It would have been the eighth sister to the group of Stalinist skyscrapers known as Seven Sisters. The architect was Dmitry Chechulin.

Original 1947 plans included an eighth tower, which would have been among the tallest buildings in the world. Following Joseph Stalin's death in 1953, it was decided that the projected structure would overshadow the Moscow Kremlin and Chechulin's 1967 Rossiya Hotel was erected on the spot. The hotel was demolished in 2006, and the Zaryadye Park was inaugurated on 9 September 2017.

== Project description ==
The final design of the administrative building in Zaryadye was completed and published in 1949, at which time its two authors, the architect Dmitry Chechulin and the engineer Iosif Tigranov, became winners of the Stalin Prize.

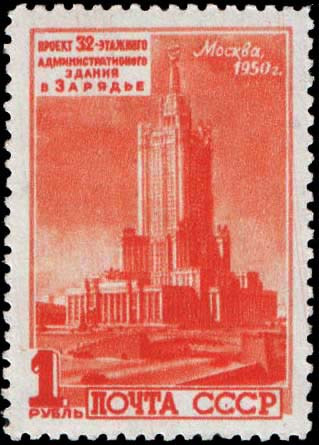
Soviet stamp "Project for a 32-storey administrative building in Zaryadye"

A 15-hectare plot was allocated for the construction of an administrative building in Zaryadye. It was bounded by Red Square to the west, Kitaygorodsky Proyezd to the east and Moskvoretskaya Embankment to the south.

The authors of the project had the difficult task of blending the 32-storey high-rise building into the historic buildings of the centre of Moscow. The administrative building in Zaryadye, along with other high-rise buildings, was to serve as a symbol of the greatness of socialist Moscow and the Stalinist era.

The structure was symmetrical and had a stepped structure. Similar to the Building of the USSR Ministry of Foreign Affairs, the administrative high-rise started with five-storey buildings in with the surrounding low-rise buildings. The buildings were located diagonally concerning one another and were equipped with lifts. In the lower part of the building, there were to be about 2,000 workrooms and offices for the staff of the department.

The upper part of the building was separated from the lower part by two intermediate levels. The first of them was to be three storeys high, and the next, a six-storey one, served as a kind of transition to the high-rise tower. This construction, topped with a gilded polyhedral tent with a spire and an emblem with symbols of the USSR, was the main part of the building. The upper floors of the tower were used as a showroom with four pavilions. The radial system of the administrative building contributed to the convenient organisation of the internal premises, the even distribution of wind loads and the strength of the structural links, which increased the building's stability.

According to the design, the main façade of the building faced the Red Square. The colonnade was to be visible from the courtyard where the entrance to the main lobby was located. From the side of Kitaygorodsky Proyezd a car park was envisaged, and around the building – landscaped public gardens with preserved architectural monuments of Zaryadye. The building was to have three entrances: the main entrance with a broad staircase led to Red Square, the second from the side of the Moskva River and the third from Razina Street. The lower part of the high-rise was more extended along the Moskvoretskaya Embankment.

The design of the building's main entrance hall envisaged the creation of a grand double-height hall divided into three naves by rows of columns. Cloakrooms for 1,700 people each were arranged in the side aisles, and a lift lobby served as an extension of the middle nave. The building was also planned to have a large assembly hall, cloakrooms, refreshment rooms, and a canteen in a separate building.

== Construction and work stoppage ==
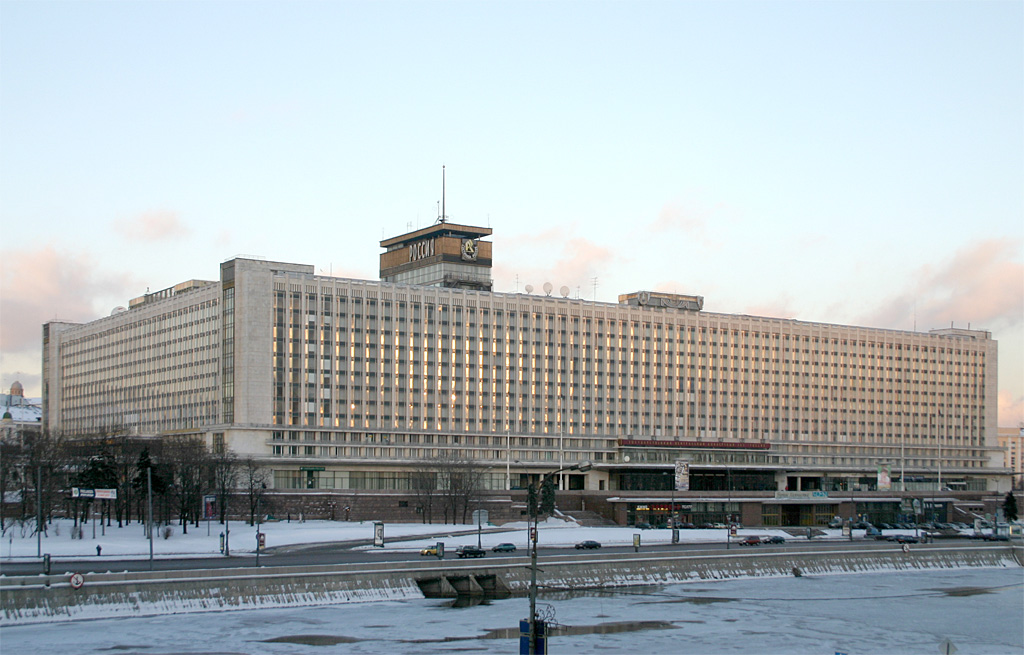
Rossiya Hotel built on the stylobate of the Eighth Sister (2004)

Work on the Eighth Sister started later than the other Sisters and proceeded at a considerably slower pace. The reasons for this were hydrogeological conditions and the need to prepare a huge building site. By the spring of 1953, the foundation and stylobate were completed and the structure reached 15 storeys a year later.

A technical floor and a two-tiered concrete bunker were added under the stylobate, which, according to historian Nikolai Kruzhkov, could have been used as a bomb shelter.

In 1954, the construction of the high-rise was stopped by the government, which was a personal tragedy for Dmitry Chechulin. The architect's attempts to modify the building's design based on the existing foundation were not accepted. According to historian Kruzhkov, the reason the construction was stopped was that Chechulin did not support the campaign against architectural excesses initiated by Soviet leader Nikita Khrushchev, which radically changed the direction of the capital's urban planning policy. From the mid-1950s, the main architectural direction was to solve the housing problem, which led to the mass construction of model housing. In these conditions high-rise construction became irrelevant. The erected frame of the administrative building was dismantled and its elements were used in the construction of other buildings.

At the beginning of the 1960s, it was decided to use the land and the base of the skyscraper for new construction. The idea of building a hotel in Zaryadye was put forward. Between 1964 and 1967, The Rossiya Hotel was built on the foundation of a high-rise building. Specialists under the direction of Dmitry Chechulin worked on the hotel's design. At the time of its completion, Rossiya Hotel was the largest hotel in the world and entered the Guinness Book of World Records in the 1970s.

== See also ==
- All-Russia Exhibition Centre
- List of skyscrapers in Europe
- Palace of the Soviets
- Academy of Science (Riga)
- Triumph Palace
- Warsaw Palace of Culture and Science
