= Moskvoretskaya Embankment =

Street in Moscow, Russia

Coordinates: 55°44′58″N 37°37′56″E

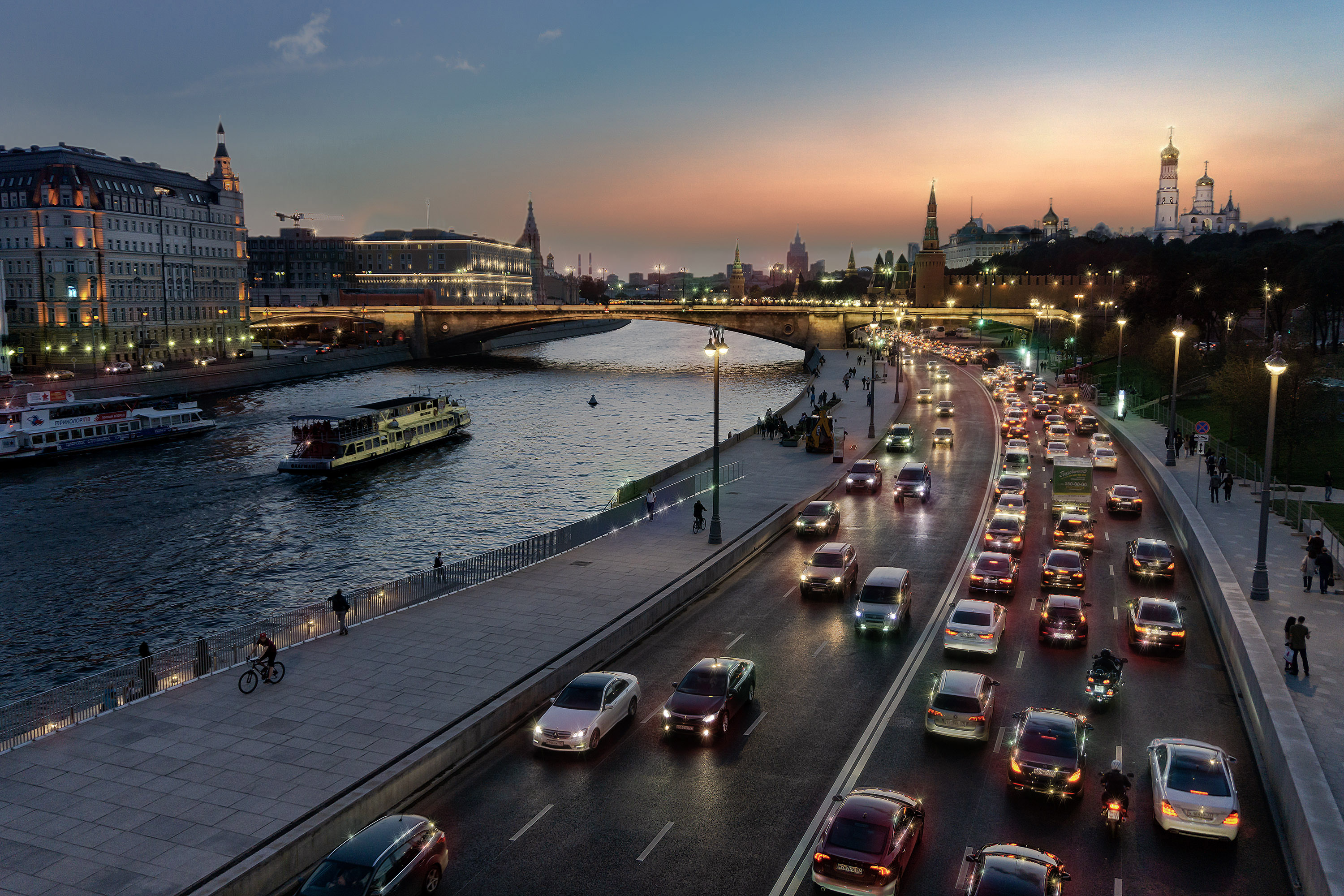
- Moskvoretskaya Embankment. view on Hotel Baltschug Kempinski, Bolshoy Moskvoretsky Bridge and Kremlin
- Interactive map of Moskvoretskaya Embankment
- Native name: Москворецкая набережная (Russian)
- Length: 1 km (0.62 mi)
- Location: Moscow; Central Administrative Okrug; Tverskoy District; Tagansky District
- Postal code: 109012, 109240
- Nearest metro station: Kitay-gorod

Moskvoretskaya Embankment (Russian: Москворецкая Набережная) is a major street, located in the Kitay-Gorod administrative district in central Moscow, running along the Moskva River.

It stretches from Kremlin Embankment, near Red Square in the west, until the mouth of Yauza River in the east. The avenue ends close to one of Joseph Stalin's Seven Sisters building on the Kotelnicheskaya Embankment. Nearly a kilometer long, until recently the embankment housed only two structures - Rossiya Hotel (demolished 2006-2007), and the historical Moscow Orphanage.

== Rossiya Hotel ==
The enormous Rossiya Hotel stood adjacent to the Moscow Kremlin. The hotel was one of the largest in the world, and was built in 1967 at the order of Nikita Khrushchev, in the Soviet-era. Demolition began in spring 2006 and continues into 2007. City plans to replace Rossiya with a mixed low-rise block of hotels and offices.

== The Orphanage ==
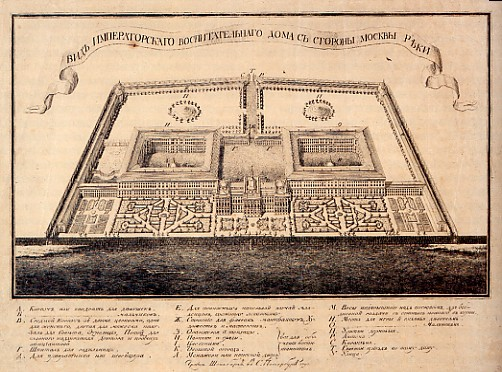
The Orphanage (Foundling Home) in Moscow, original draft

Another huge structure, extending 379 meters from the Rossiya Hotel site to Yauza Gates, is the Moscow Orphanage (Vospitatelny Dom, Foundling House). Conceived by educator Ivan Betzkoy, the Orphanage was laid down in 1763 to the decree of Catherine the Great. First stage (the central core) was completed by Carl Blank in 1770. In 1780s-1820s, the building was expanded westward by Giovanni Giliardi and his son, Domenico Giliardi; the eastern wing was completed only in 1940s. The orphanage, converted in 1812 to a military hospital, is one of the few downtown structures that survived the Fire of Moscow (1812), defended by its staff.

Today, it houses the Academy of Strategic Rocket Forces, medical facilities and offices.
