= Dmitry Chechulin =

Russian architect

- Дмитрий Чечулин
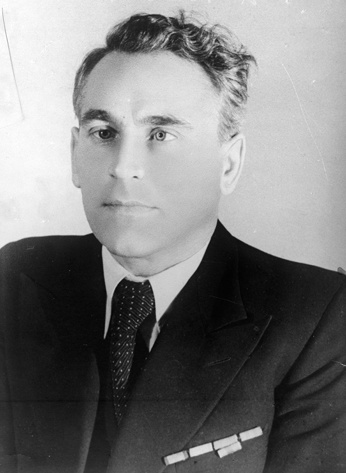
- Chechulin in 1946
- Born: August 9, 1901; Shostka, Russian Empire
- Died: October 29, 1981 (aged 80); Moscow, USSR
- Resting place: Novodevichy Cemetery
- Citizenship: Soviet
- Education: Vkhutemas
- Occupations: Architect, lecturer
- Awards: Hero of Socialist Labour, Order of Lenin, Order of the October Revolution, Order of the Badge of Honour, Order of Friendship of Peoples, Medal "For Labour Valour", Jubilee Medal "In Commemoration of the 100th Anniversary of the Birth of Vladimir Ilyich Lenin", Medal "For Valiant Labour in the Great Patriotic War 1941–1945", Medal "In Commemoration of the 800th Anniversary of Moscow", People's Architect of the USSR, Lenin Prize, Stalin Prize
- Buildings: Peking Hotel; Rossiya Hotel; Kotelnicheskaya Embankment Building; Moskva Pool; White House

Dmitry Nikolaevich Chechulin (Russian: Дми́трий Никола́евич Чечу́лин; 22 August [O.S. 9 August] 1901 – 29 October 1981) was a Russian Soviet architect, city planner, author, and leading figure of Stalinist architecture.

== Life ==
Born in Shostka (Sumy Oblast, today in Ukraine) to a working-class family, after service in the Red Army Chechulin enrolled in the state school Vkhutemas and graduated in 1929, doing post-graduate work under Alexey Shchusev.

In the 1930s Chechulin was awarded commissions for four stations of the Moscow Metro, and developed his career to design a list of familiar Moscow landmarks. From 1945 through 1949 he served as chief architect of Moscow.

Chechulin's work intersects with the Palace of the Soviets competition (the major event in Soviet architectural history) at multiple points. He was among the twelve finalists in the final round. He is credited for the Kotelnicheskaya Embankment Building, one of the seven Moscow vysotki (tall buildings) commissioned by Stalin after World War II as a "frame" for, and then in lieu of, the unbuilt Palace. Chechulin had produced plans for the unbuilt eighth tower, the Zaryadye skyscraper, in 1947. And when, after decades of neglect and delay, the huge excavation for the Palace of the Soviets finally became the world's largest open-air swimming pool in 1958, he was the architect.

Chechulin wrote nearly 40 books, pamphlets, monographs and articles on architecture, urban planning and design issues. Among his many awards were Hero of Socialist Labour (1976), People's Architect of the USSR (1971), two Orders of Lenin, two Orders of the Red Banner of Labour, the Order of Honour, and three Stalin Prizes (1941, 1949, 1953).

He died 29 October 1981 and is buried at Novodevichy Cemetery.

== Work ==
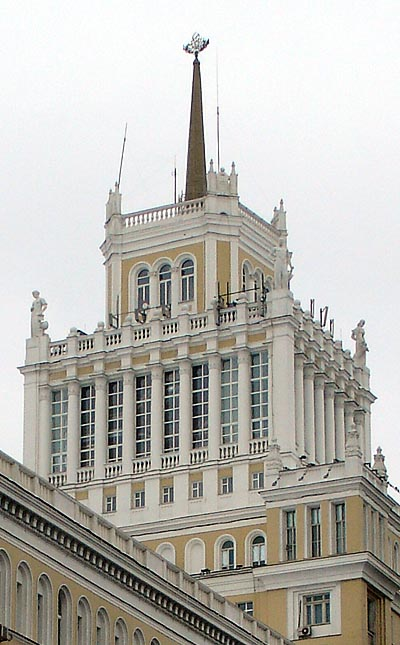
Hotel Peking

The following works are in Moscow unless otherwise indicated:

- Komsomolskaya (Sokolnicheskaya Line) station, Moscow Metro, 1935
- vestibules for Okhotny Ryad Metro station, 1935
- Kievskaya (Filyovskaya Line) Metro station, 1937
- vestibules for the Dynamo Metro station, 1938
- the Moscow Pavilion at the All-Union Agricultural Exhibition, now the All-Russia Exhibition Centre, 1939
- Tchaikovsky Concert Hall, 1940
- the Victory Bridge (with sculptor Nikolai Tomsky), 1943
- the Stalinist skyscraper at the Kotelnicheskaya Embankment (one of the Seven Sisters), 1947–1952
- the Peking Hotel, 1955
- Moskva Pool, 1958
- the White House, 1965–1981
- the Rossiya Hotel, Moscow, on the site of the unbuilt Zaryadye tower, 1967 (razed 2006)

== Sources ==
- Chechulin's Palace of the Soviets entry
- list of buildings

Political offices
Preceded by Sergey Chernyshyov	Chief Architect of Moscow; 1945—1949	Succeeded by Aleksandr Vlasov
