= Moskva Pool =

Open-air swimming pool in Moscow, 1958-1994

Coordinates: 55°44′40″N 37°36′20″E

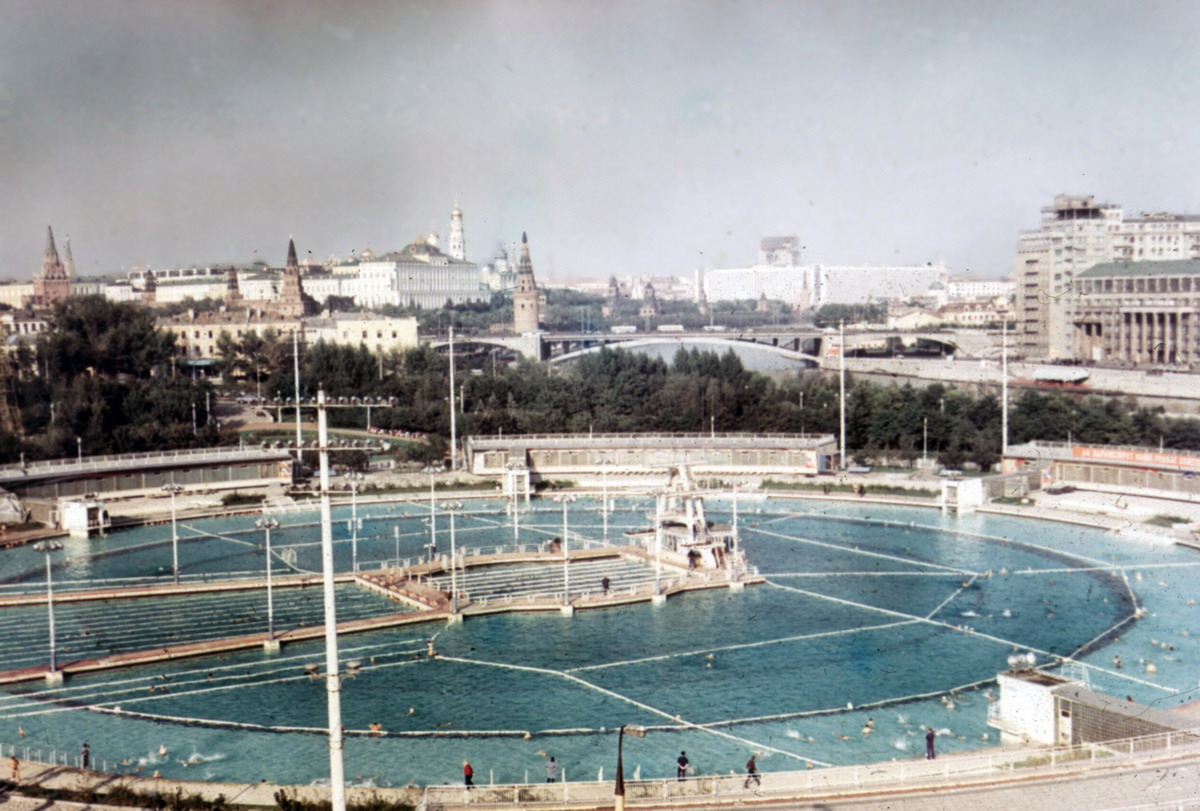
Moskva Pool, 1969

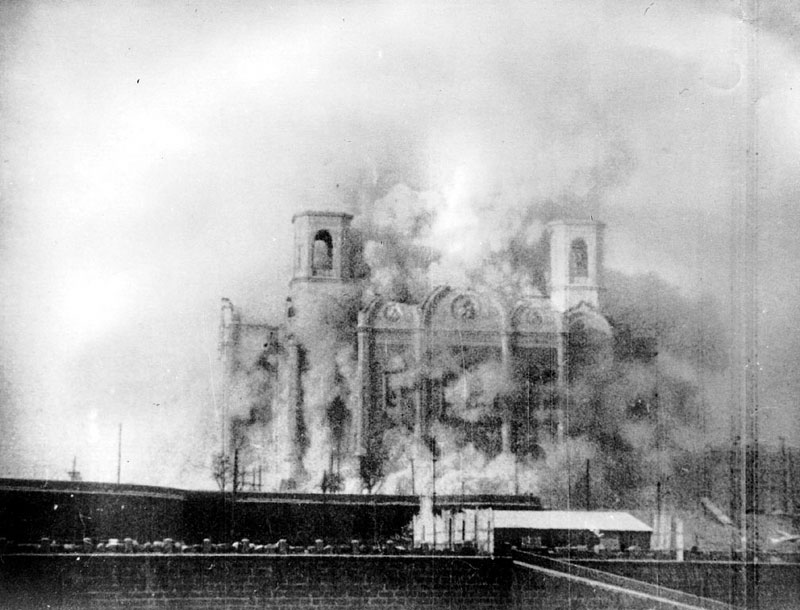
The demolition of the Cathedral of Christ the Saviour in 1931

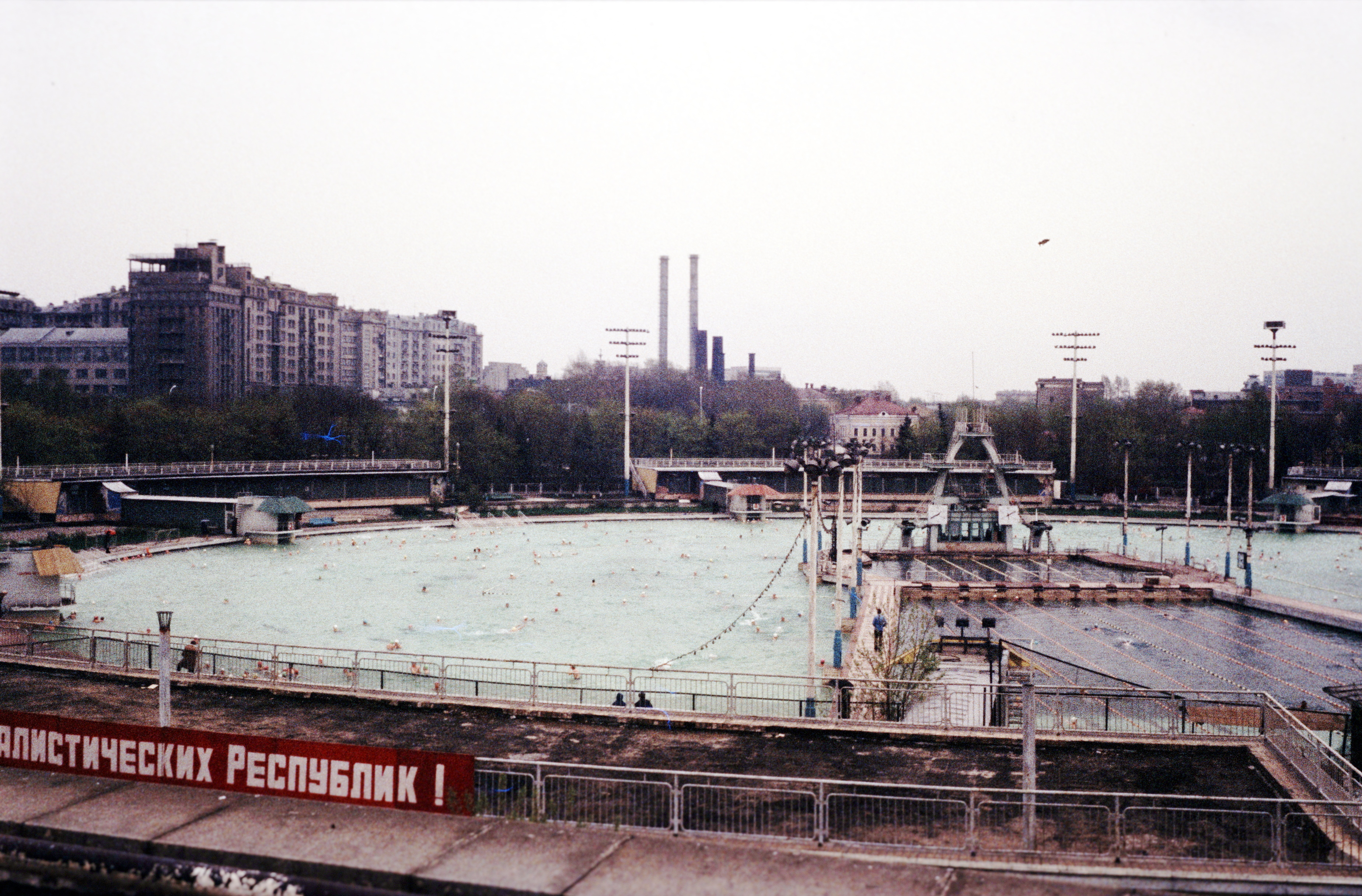
Moskva Pool in 1980

The Moskva Pool (Moscow Pool) was, for a time, the world's largest open air swimming pool, built in Moscow on the site of the demolished Cathedral of Christ the Saviour.

It was built in Moscow in 1958 on the foundation of the abandoned Palace of the Soviets, to the designs of Moscow architect Dmitry Chechulin. Construction of the Palace of Soviets had begun in 1937 and was abandoned in 1941 when steel from the foundation of the building was used for war materials during World War II. The construction did not resume after the war's end, and the empty foundation of the Palace of the Soviets in 1958 was made into an open-air swimming pool which existed from 1958 until 1994. The water was heated in order to extend the pool season into colder weather. In 1995, the Cathedral of Christ the Saviour was restored in its place, the original cathedral having been demolished in 1931 by the Soviet government to make way for the Palace of the Soviets.

== Architectural features ==
The Moskva Pool was an artificial circular hydraulic structure. The diameter of the water surface was 130 m, the area was 13 thousand square meters, the volume of water was 25 thousand cubic meters. The capacity of the swimming pool was up to 20 thousand visitors per day and up to three million per year. About 24 million people visited the swimming pool during its first ten years of operation.

The swimming pool operated year-round, receiving visitors even in temperatures as low as -20 °C. The water temperature was regulated by an artificial heating system and did not drop below 18° and 22° in summer and winter respectively. During the cold seasons, the water was heated to 32–34 °C. For safety reasons, use of the pool at temperatures below -20° was not allowed, as the dense, thick steam over the surface of the water made it difficult to observe swimmers and the work of lifeguards. There is a theory that the huge evaporation area of the water surface was the cause of corrosion of the neighbouring buildings.

The water came into the pool from the city water supply and was heated in a boiler room. It was passed through filters and chlorinated before being supplied. The facility had a laboratory that checked the quality of the water.

The water area of the swimming pool was divided into sections for free swimming and exercise, and its main purpose was "mass recreational swimming and recreation". The facility housed therapeutic and recreational swimming groups for children and adults, synchronised swimming and water polo groups. A sports sector with a separate entrance was equipped for training. The sports swimming pool was divided into eight lanes and in the centre, there were a 10 m high diving platform with the option of jumping from different heights. The complex also had a bathhouse with a sauna.

The design of the outdoor swimming pool included landscaping and beautification of the surrounding area. The water reservoir was surrounded by an 11-metre-wide beach with an embankment of sea gravel. There were five shallow children's pools, benches and trees growing there. Next to the beach, there were pavilions with cashiers, a cloakroom and a buffet, which could accommodate two thousand people at a time. They sold and lent out swimming gear. During the winter, the exits from the pool were connected to the pavilions by special corridors. The depth of the pool was originally four metres, but due to the increasing number of drownings, the bottom was covered with concrete, raising it to a height of 1.85 m.

The swimming pool was included in the civil defence system of Moscow and a decontamination point was to operate there during emergencies.

== Problems ==
The huge area of evaporation generated by the huge water surface of the pool was the cause of corrosion of neighboring buildings. In particular, employees of the Pushkin Museum complained that the location of the outdoor pool negatively affects the safety of the exhibits.

== Closing ==
The construction of the pool on a site of the destroyed cultural heritage caused a negative reaction of the Moscow public. The expression "First there was a church [the Cathedral], then rubbish [the unbuilt Palace of Soviets], and now shame [the pool]" (Russian: Сперва был храм, потом — хлам, а теперь — срам., romanized: Sperva byl khram, potom – khlam, a teper' – sram.) became commonplace.

In April 1988, a grassroots movement to restore the Cathedral of Christ the Saviour emerged in Moscow. In September 1989, a decision was taken to restore it at its former site, and a year later a foundation stone was laid next to the swimming pool. In 1991, the Moskva swimming pool ceased operations and was abandoned for three years, though in fact swimmers were being admitted in the summer of 1993; on January 7, 1995, the foundation of the cathedral was laid.
