= Rossiya Hotel =

Former hotel in Moscow, Russia

Coordinates: 55°45′05″N 37°37′44″E

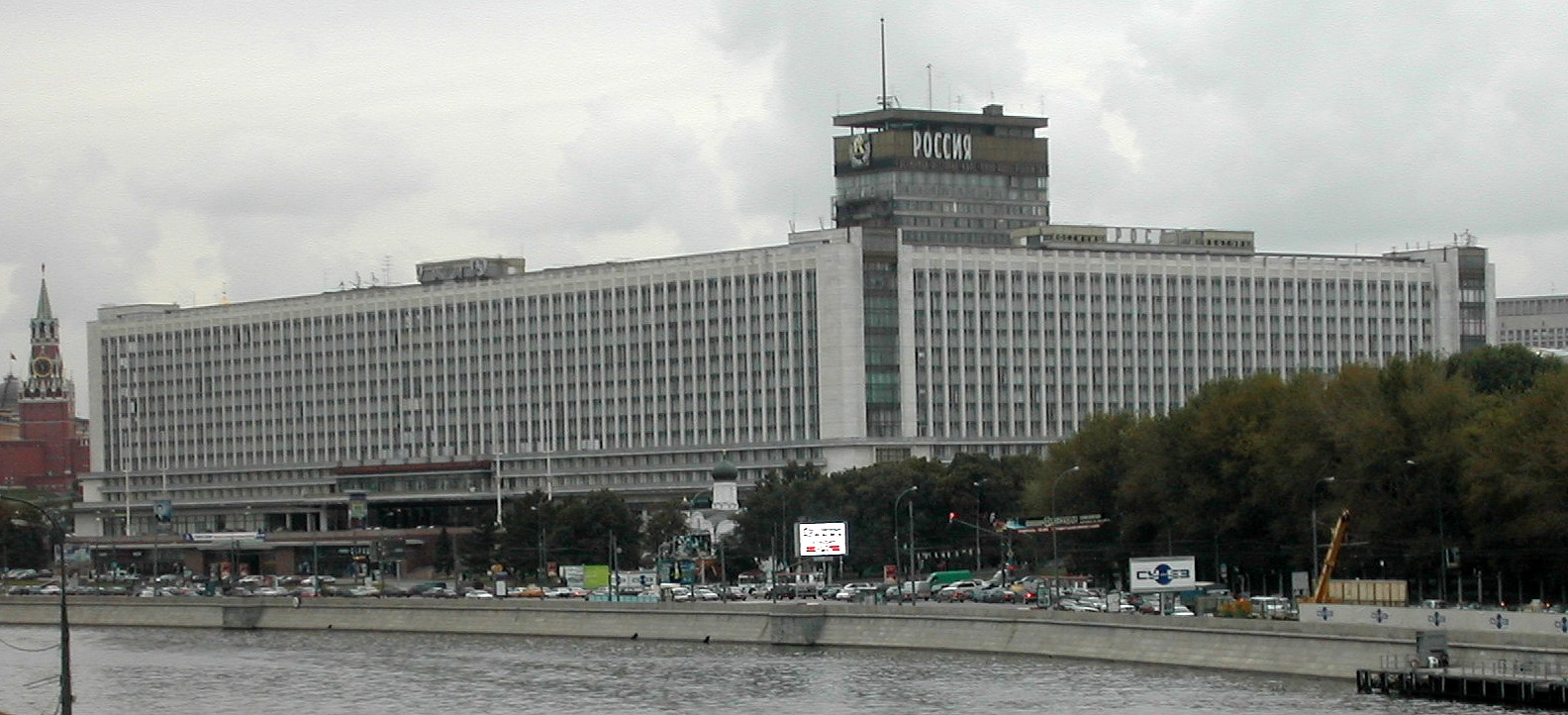
- Rossiya Hotel in 2004
- Interactive map of the Rossiya Hotel area

General information
- Type: Hotel
- Location: Moscow, Russia
- Opened: 1967
- Demolished: 2006

Design and construction
- Architect: Dmitry Chechulin

The Rossiya Hotel (Russian: Гостиница «Россия», romanized: Gostinitsa "Rossiya") was a hotel in Moscow and was the largest hotel in the world from 1967 to 1980. Until its closure in 2006, it remained the second largest hotel in Europe, with 3,182 rooms. Throughout its existence, the hotel welcomed about ten million guests, including more than two million foreigners. Famous hotel guests included Mikhail Gorbachev, George H. W. Bush and Mike Tyson.

== History ==
=== Background: destruction of Zaryadye ===
The 1935 Soviet master plan of Moscow called for demolition of Zaryadye, the historic district of Moscow, clearing space for the Industry Building (Narkomtiazhprom) and its riverside ramps. This project did not materialise as planned.

The first round of destruction (1936) cleared the blocks adjacent to Moscow Kremlin for the ramps of Bolshoy Moskvoretsky Bridge.

This was followed by the destruction of most of Zaryadye in 1947, clearing the ground for the skyscraper designed by Dmitry Chechulin. This project was cancelled at the foundation stage. A 1947 postcard shows that, in addition to the existing row of churches on Varvarka Street, this round of demolition spared the 2-story buildings on Moskvoretskaya Street, next to the bridge, and the Kitai-gorod wall facing the river. According to P. V. Sytin, the historical church of St. Anna and other relics had to be disassembled and rebuilt in the Kolomenskoye park; this did not materialise. The site was left vacant for over 15 years.

A third round, in the 1960s, cleared these buildings near the bridge.

=== Hotel ===
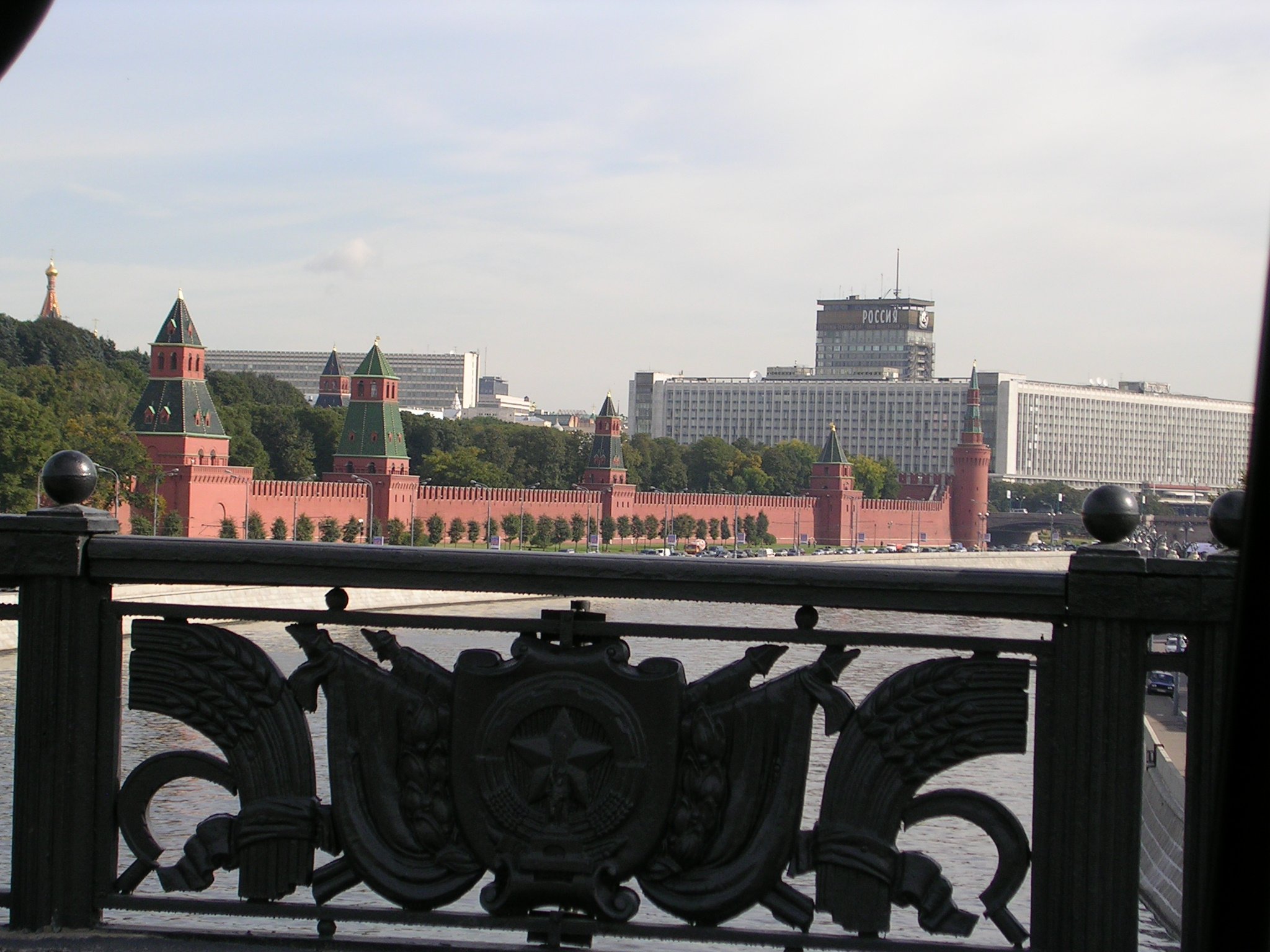
View from the Bolshoy Kamenny Bridge

The Rossiya Hotel was built in Moscow from 1964 until 1967 at the order of the Soviet government. Construction used the existing foundations of a cancelled skyscraper project, the Zaryadye Administrative Building, which would have been the eighth of what are now referred to as the "Seven Sisters". One of the prerequisites for the construction of the new tourist complex in Moscow was to address the lack of hotel rooms. This became especially important after the construction of the State Kremlin Palace. The projected hotel had to accommodate not only tourists but also congress delegates and participants of congresses.

In 1956, the Architecture and Planning Department of Moscow approved the task of building the hotel complex, proposed by architect Dmitry Chechulin and engineers N. D. Vishnevsky and A. N. Gorbatko. In 1958, Chechulin went on trips to London and Paris to see the best examples of hotel architecture, as well as consulting with representatives of the American company Hilton. In 1960, the plan for the hotel in Moscow was finally approved by the authorities and construction began in 1964. Construction was completed on 1 January 1967. At the time of its construction, the Rossiya Hotel was the largest hotel in the world with 3,182 rooms. The complex consisted of three restaurants, several cafes, bars and buffets, a Zaryadye cinema, a concert hall with 2,600 seats, a sauna with a swimming pool, laundries, a telephone exchange, a shop, etc. The staff numbered 1,320 people.

In 1980, before the 1980 Summer Olympics this record was surpassed by the Izmailovo Hotel also in Moscow with 5,000 rooms, although it remained the second largest hotel in Europe until its closure in 2006.

=== Fire ===
On 25 February 1977, a major fire in the building killed 42 and injured 50.

== Architectural features ==
The hotel complex occupied 13 hectares and was built on the finished foundation of an unfinished high-rise. In terms Rossiya Hotel was a closed rectangle of 250 by 150 meters, formed by four 12-storey buildings with a courtyard. Due to the difference in relief between Varvarka Street and Moskvoretskaya Embankment, three of the four buildings were built on a high stylobate.

The architecture of the Rossiya Hotel is close to the international style. The facades of the buildings were characterised by light cladding and the clear rhythm of the windows trimmed with aluminium. The stylobate of the building was covered with brown polished granite. The dominant architectural feature of the building was the 23-storey Northern Tower, which crowned the northern façade. The southern façade faced Moskvoretskaya Embankment and was divided by a promenade. On 5 November 1971, the Rossiya Central Concert Hall for 2.5 thousand seats was opened in the south building. The internal decoration of the Hall used traditional combinations of Russian palace architecture: white marble, bronze and precious wood. The stage and parterre of the auditorium were made in light colours. The auditorium could be transformed: it could be inclined or horizontally. A direct translation system in eight languages was installed in the seats. The Concert Hall could be used for projections and films. In addition, restaurants and VIP lounges, a library, a hairdresser's and other businesses were also accommodated within the hotel complex. The basement part of the building, the perimeter of which occupied two or three floors, contained the lobbies and passages to the courtyard. Terraces, external stairs and building ramps adjoined the basement. Underneath the hotel were military facilities, such as a bunker which could have been used as a bomb shelter.

== Dismantling ==
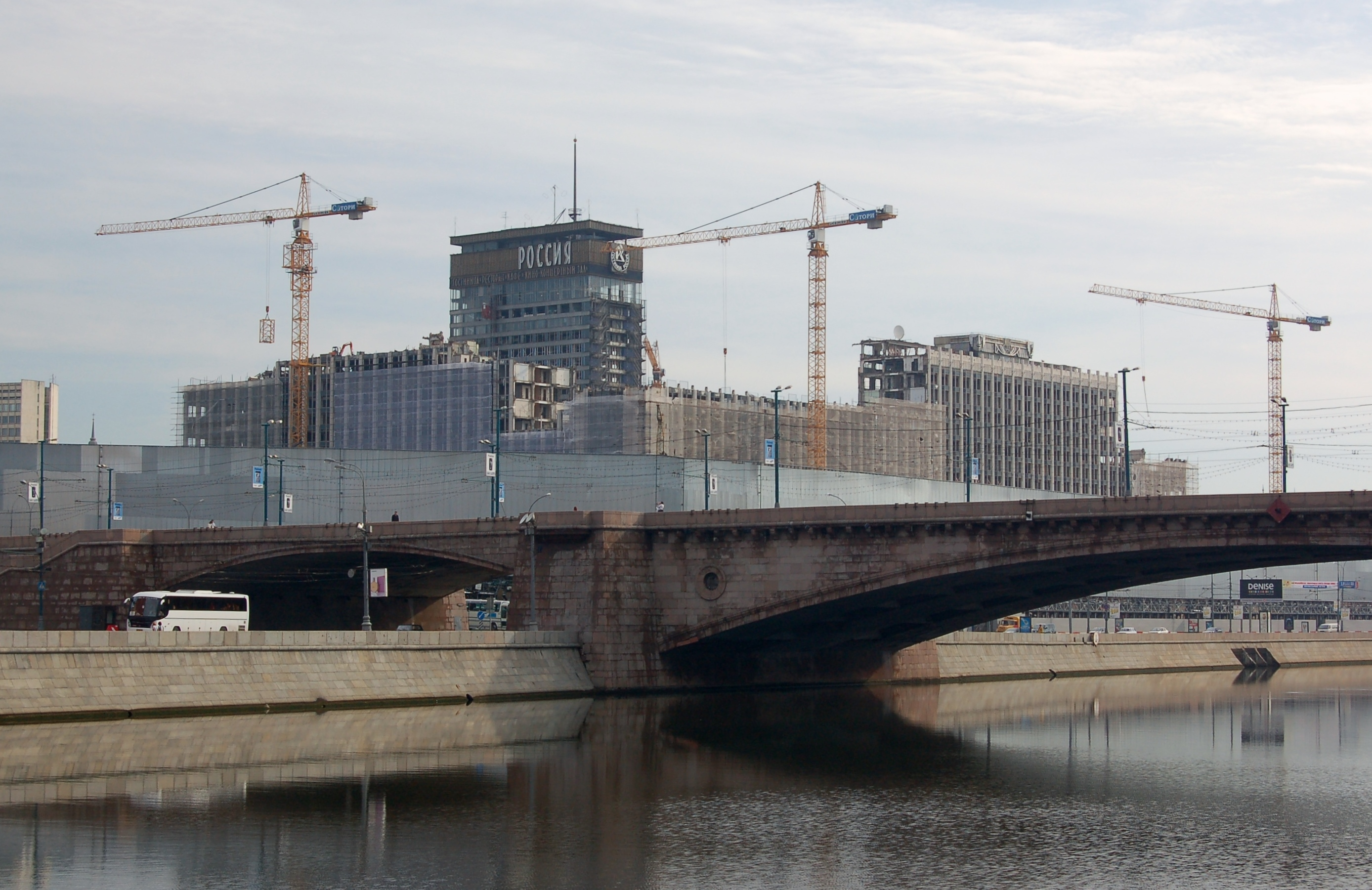
Dismantling of the hotel, August 2006

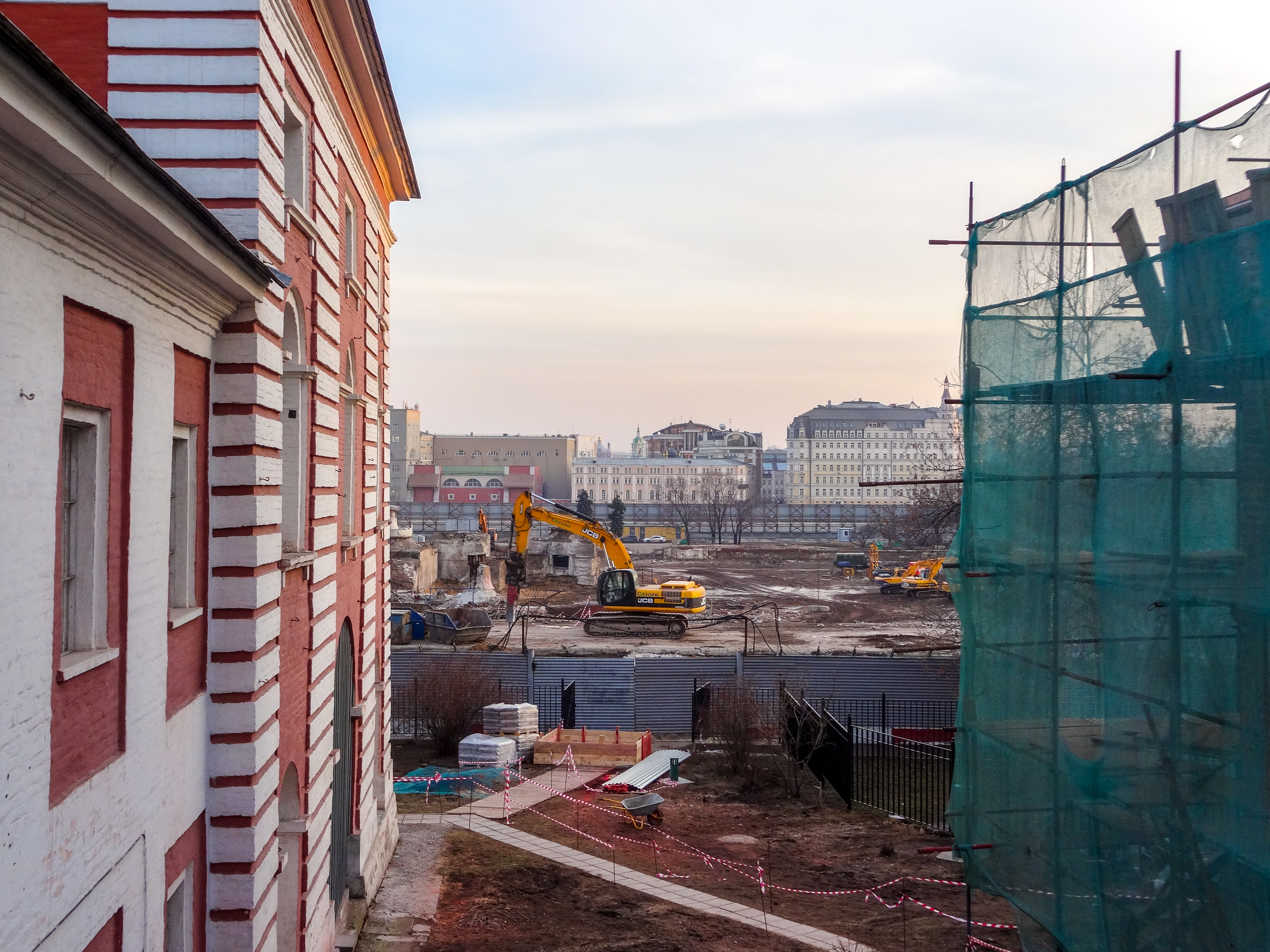
Dismantling of the remains of Rossiya Hotel before construction of Zaryadye Park, March 2015

The Rossiya Hotel closed on 1 January 2006. Dismantling of the building began in March 2006 for a planned entertainment complex which would have been loosely based on the design of the old Zaryadye district. The project was to be overseen by British architect Sir Norman Foster and would have included a new, two thousand-room hotel with apartments and a parking garage.

In October 2006, the Supreme Arbitration Court cancelled the results of a tender to reconstruct the Rossiya hotel near the Kremlin. The hotel's site remained vacant until 2013, when it was announced that Zaryadye Park would be developed there. The park opened in November 2017.

== See also ==
- Jingxi Hotel, a hotel built for similar purposes by the Chinese government
