= Zaryadye Park =

Park in Moscow

- Парк Зарядье
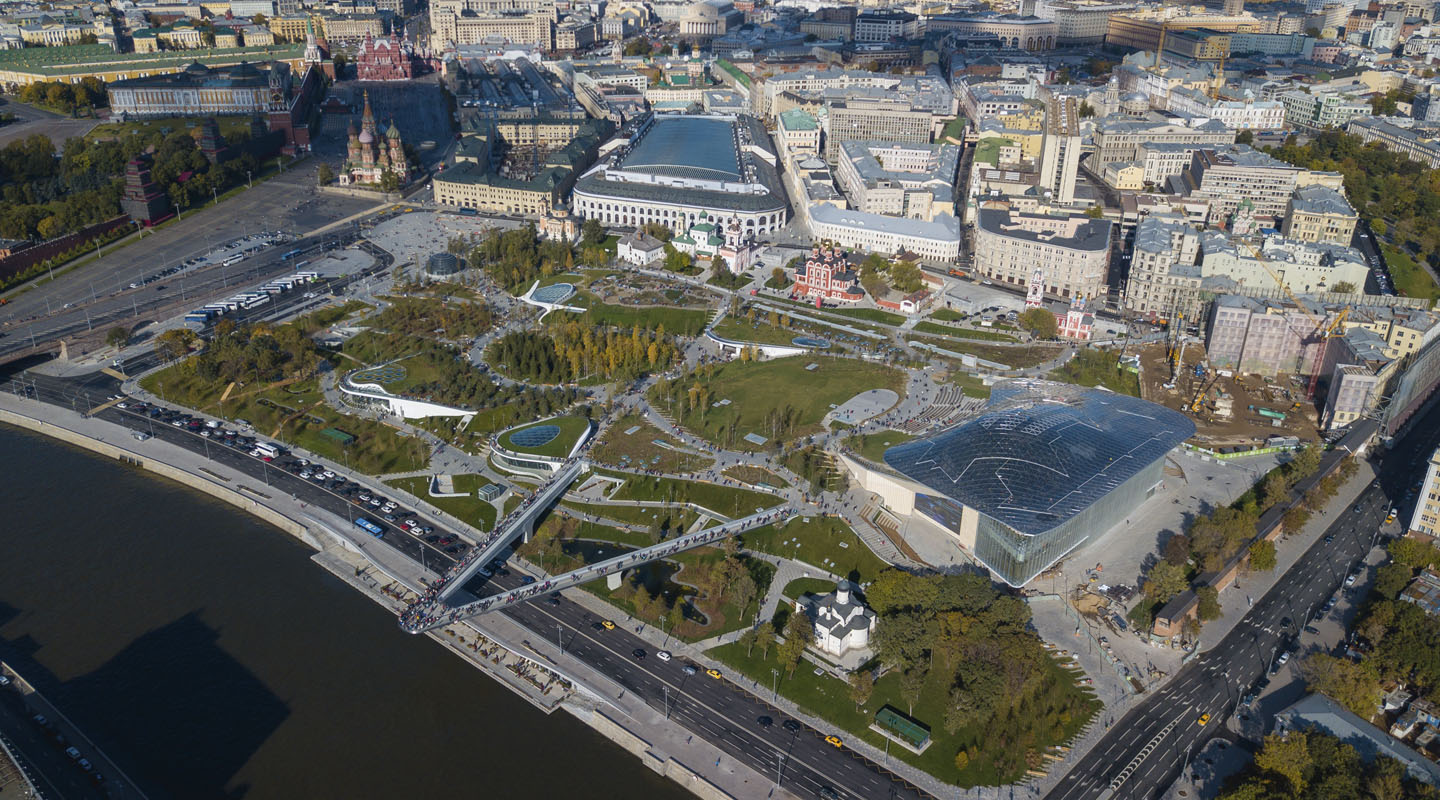
- Interactive map of Zaryadye Park
- Type: Urban park, Forest park
- Location: Moscow, Russia
- Coordinates: 55.751°N 37.629°E
- Area: 13 hectares (32 acres)
- Created: 2014–2017
- Open: 9 September 2017
- Status: Open all year
- Public transit: Kitay-gorod; Ploshchad Revolyutsii

Zaryadye Park (Russian: Парк Зарядье) is a landscape urban park located adjacent to Red Square in Moscow, Russia, on the site of the former Zaryadye district. The park was inaugurated on 9 September 2017 by Russian president Vladimir Putin and Moscow Mayor Sergey Sobyanin.

Time magazine included Zaryadye Park on its 2018 list of the “World's Greatest Places”.

== History ==
The 1935 Soviet master plan of Moscow called for demolition of Zaryadye, the historic district of Moscow, clearing space for the Industry Building (Narkomtiazhprom) and its riverside ramps. This project did not materialize as planned.

The first round of destruction (1936) cleared the blocks adjacent to Moscow Kremlin for the ramps of Bolshoy Moskvoretsky Bridge.

This was followed by the destruction of most of Zaryadye in 1947, clearing the ground for the skyscraper designed by Dmitry Chechulin. This project was cancelled at the foundation stage. A 1947 postcard shows that, in addition to the existing row of churches on Varvarka Street, this round of demolition spared the 2-story buildings on Moskvoretskaya Street, right next to the bridge, and the Kitai-gorod wall facing the river. According to P. V. Sytin, the historical church of St. Anna and other relics had to be disassembled and rebuilt in the Kolomenskoye park; this did not materialize. The site was left vacant for over 15 years.

A third round, in the 1960s, cleared these buildings near the bridge. In 1967, Rossiya Hotel was built on this site. The demolition of the hotel was completed in 2007 and a new urban park, Zaryadye Park, was opened on the site of the former hotel in 2017.

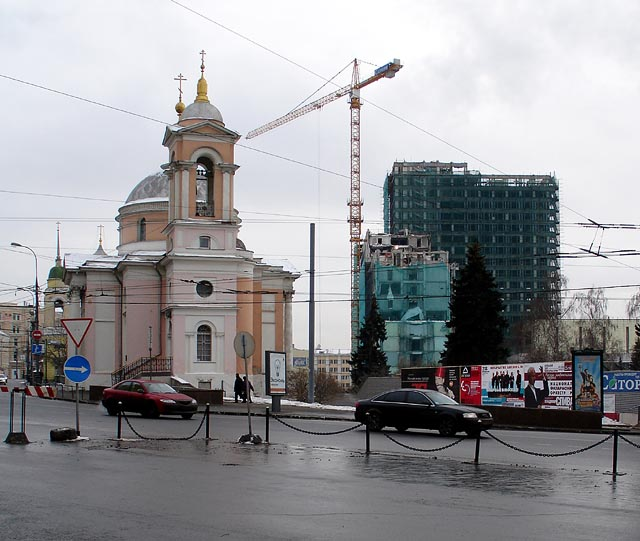
Dismantling of Rossiya, February 3, 2007

== Description ==
The area of the park's facilities is almost 78,000 square meters, of which 25,200 square meters is occupied by a multipurpose concert hall. The park also has underground parking for 430 cars. The first new park in Moscow for over 50 years, its construction cost more than $480 million. Plans for a new park were first raised in 2012 when the city of Moscow and its chief architect Sergey Kuznetsov organized a design competition to transform the historically privatized, commercial Zaryadye area into a public park. An international design consortium led by Diller Scofidio + Renfro (DS+R) with Hargreaves Associates, Citymakers and BuroHappold Engineering was selected out of 90 submissions from 27 different countries. The selected competition design sought to create a park borne of Russian and Muscovite heritage.

The main feature of the park is its facilities hidden under the landscape, while the park itself is divided into four climatic zones: forest, steppe, tundra, and the floodplains. These zones are organized in terraces that descend from northeast to southwest, with each layering over the next to create a total of 14,000 square meters of enclosed, programmed spaces integrated into the landscape: nature and architecture act as one. Visitors can enjoy a river overlook cantilevering 70 meters over Moscow River, media center, nature center, restaurant, market, two amphitheaters and a philharmonic concert hall.

Another feature of the new park is a picturesque view of the Kremlin, which visitors can enjoy from the Soaring bridge over the Moskva River.

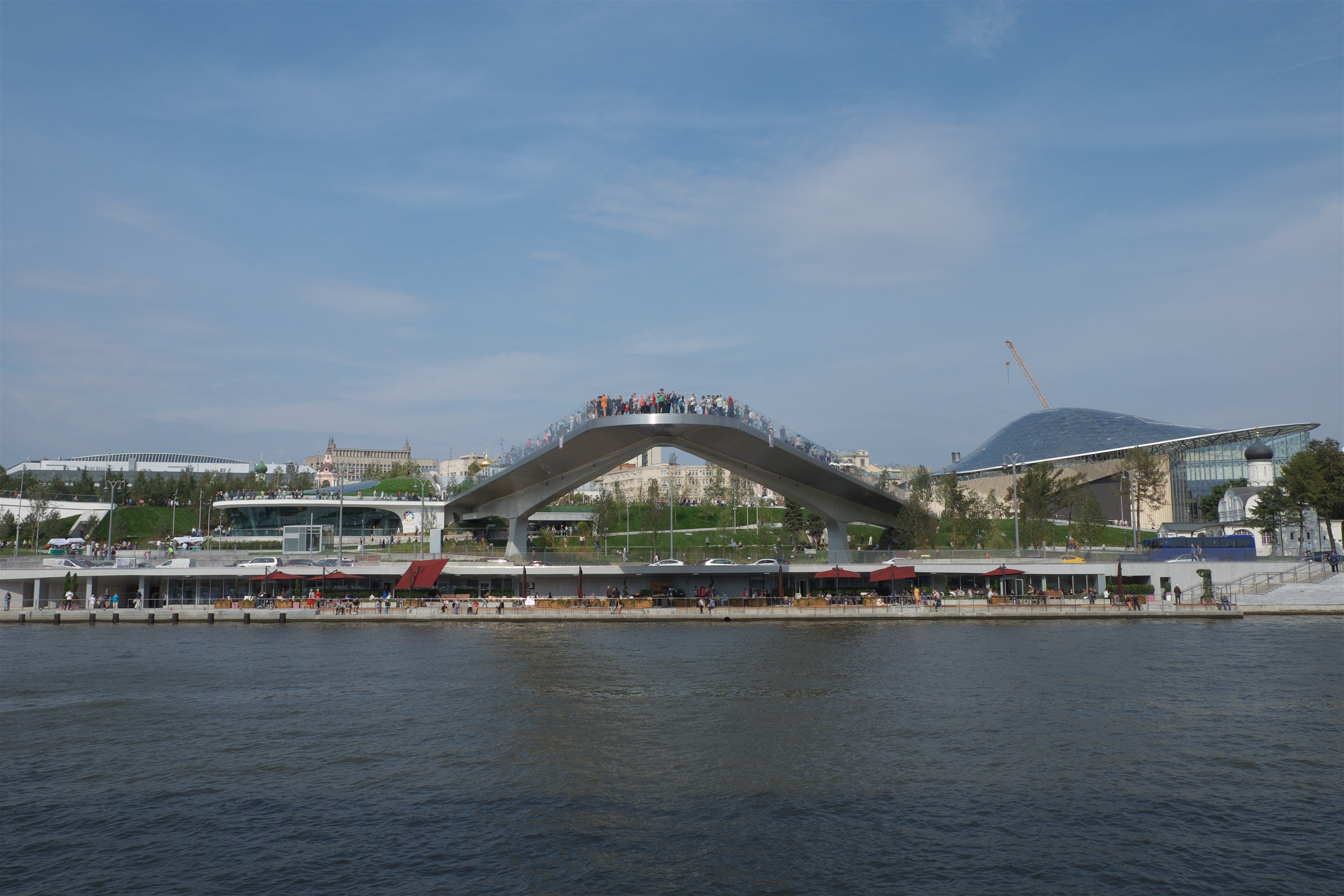
The Soaring bridge

=== Soaring bridge ===
The Soaring bridge is a thin airy V-shaped structure with a large outward extension above the water. The bridge protracts 70 meters without a single support. The bearing structure of the bridge is made of concrete and the decorative elements are made of metal; the deck is wooden. The construction withstands a load of 240 tons corresponding to three to four thousand people. High fences are installed so that no one can climb or jump over the sides of the bridge.

=== Media center ===
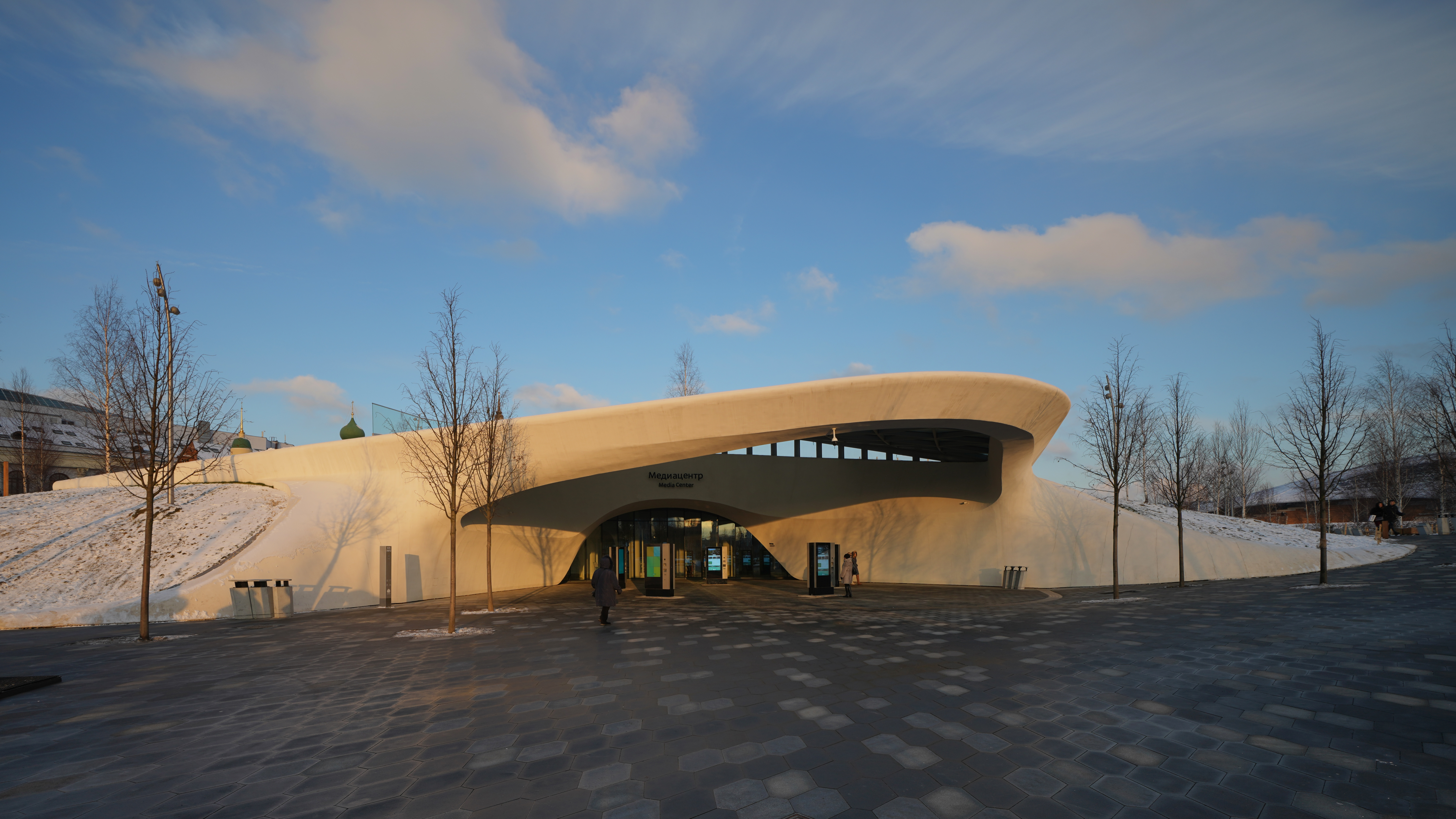
Media center

The media center covers an area of 8500 square meters. It exhibits Russian natural and architectural sights and covers various topics of the Russian history, such as the Battle of Borodino, the fire of Moscow, and the Council at Fili. In one of the pavilions of the media center, viewers are shown films about cultural monuments, protected areas and historical places of Russia. In the cinema, three rows of chairs are located on a movable platform in front of a concave screen, its shape creating a panoramic image.

The only digital media hall in Russia with a cylindrical screen and an interactive image virtually transports viewers to the times during the formation of Moscow.

=== Ice cave ===
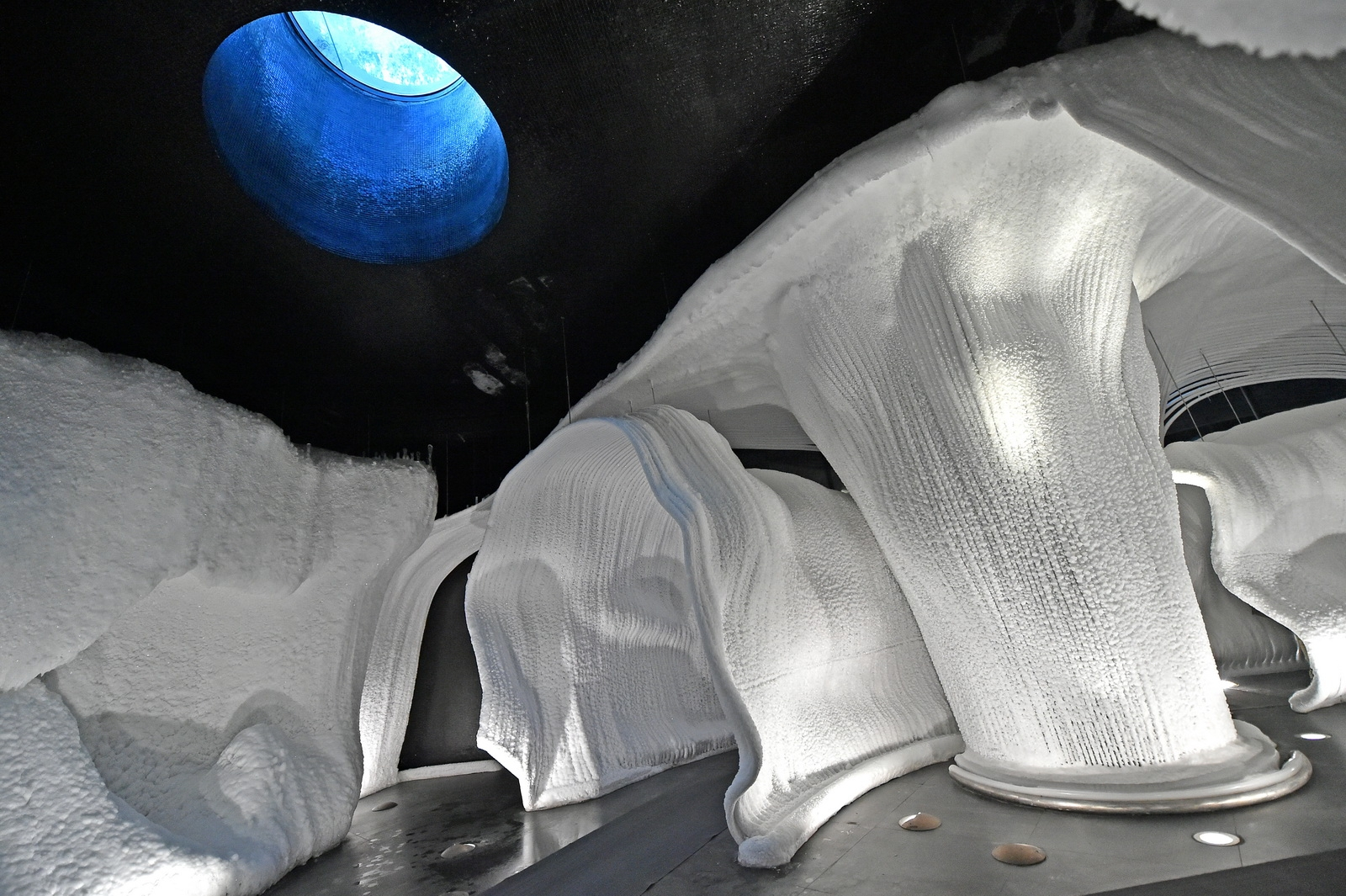
Ice cave

A stylized pavilion with an interactive exhibition tells visitors about the history of development of the Far North. In one part of the pavilion, a negative temperature is maintained. About 70 tons of water is required to form the cave. The temperature in the cave does not rise above -2 °C and does not fall below -12 °C. The cover of the cave itself is a natural white colour.

In the ice cave, an educational site, the "Conservation Embassy", was also started. Employees of national reserves and other environmental institutions are able to conduct educational programs here, as well as exchange experiences in the field of biology and ecology.

=== Concert hall ===
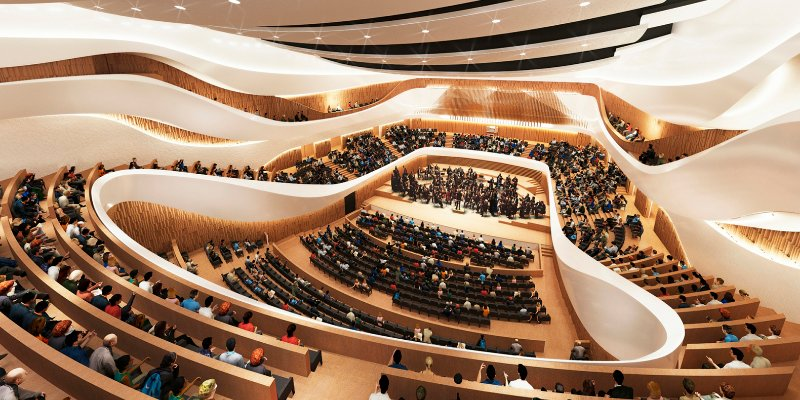
Zaryadye Concert Hall

In the park there is a concert hall with an amphitheatre. The building under a glass dome with an organ and a stage-transformer is a multifunctional concert venue. The building is set into the hill and it is possible to walk along its roof. Only the glass facade remains open.

The new Philharmonic replaces the concert site of the demolished Rossiya Hotel, on the site of which the park was built. It hosts symphonic music, as well as pop and jazz concerts.

=== Amphitheatres ===
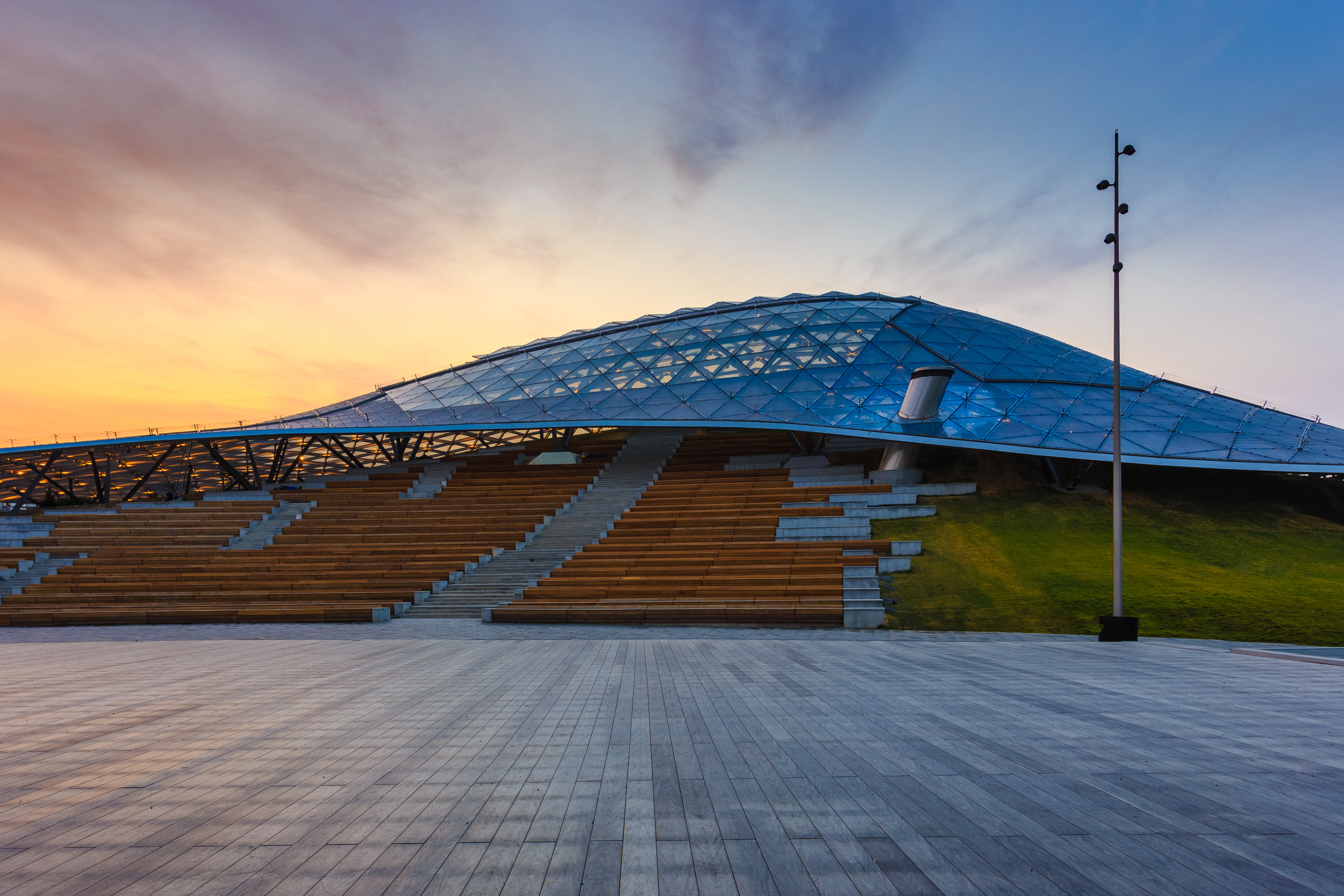
The Grand Amphitheatre

The large amphitheatre adjoins to the Philharmonic and it is covered with a dome, the so-called glass bark, to protect the audience from the rain. The amphitheatre is a stepped landscape design descending from the hill to the stage. The spots are made of wood. The paths between the rows are filled with small pebbles and become part of the drainage system. The amphitheatre organically fits into the natural landscape of the park. The large open amphitheatre in Zaryadye can accommodate 1500 spectators.

The small amphitheatre, in which a media screen is installed, is designed for 400 visitors. The screen is used for film screenings, concerts, lectures and other events. The design of the summer amphitheatre was developed by the winner of the 2012 competition for the project of Zaryadye Park.

=== "Flight over Russia" attraction ===
On a 12-meter parabolic screen, viewers sitting on special dynamic platforms are shown about 30 unique natural locations in Russia, taken from a height. In one session the attraction is able to accommodate 40 people, and its capacity is 400 spectators per hour.

== Gallery ==
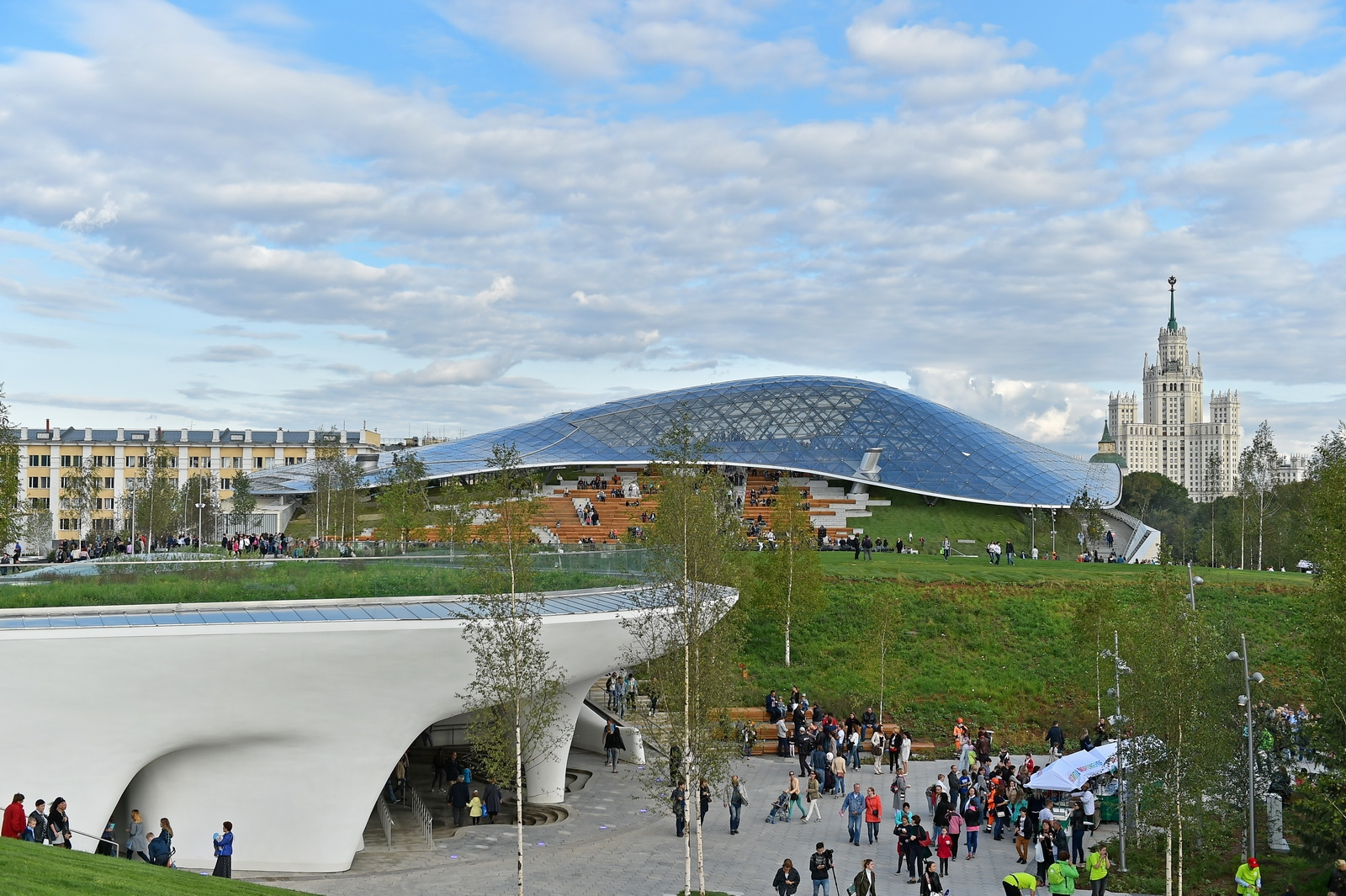

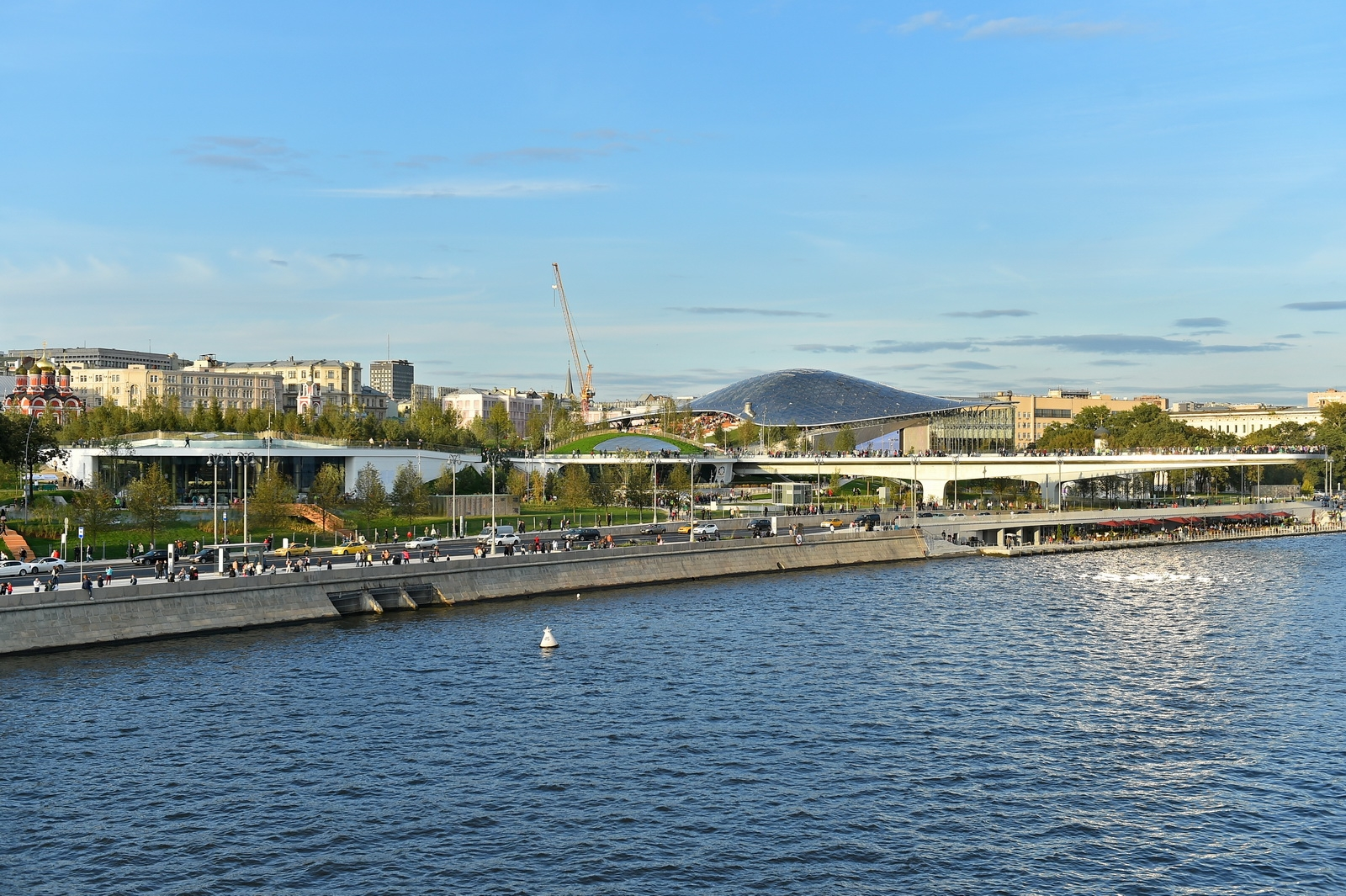

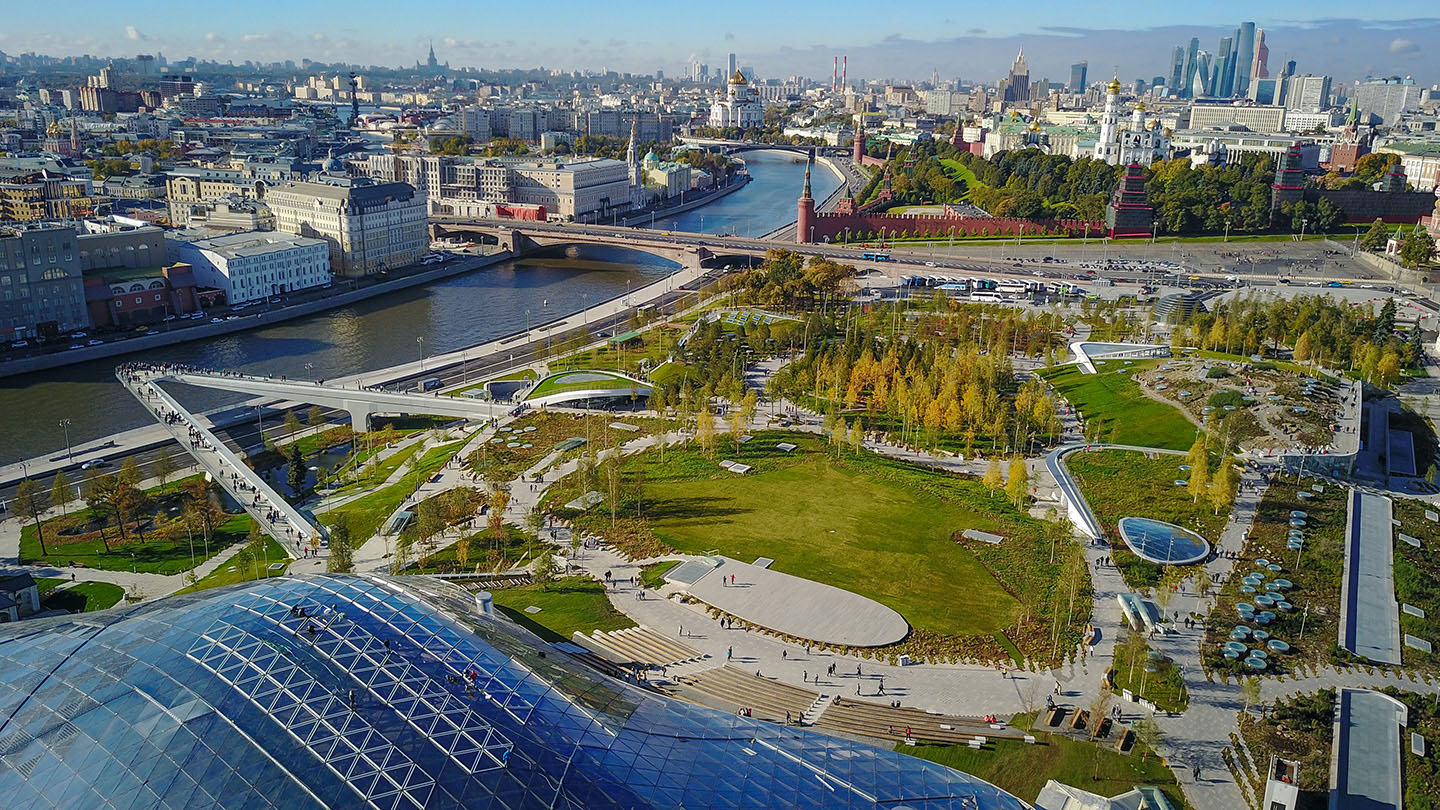

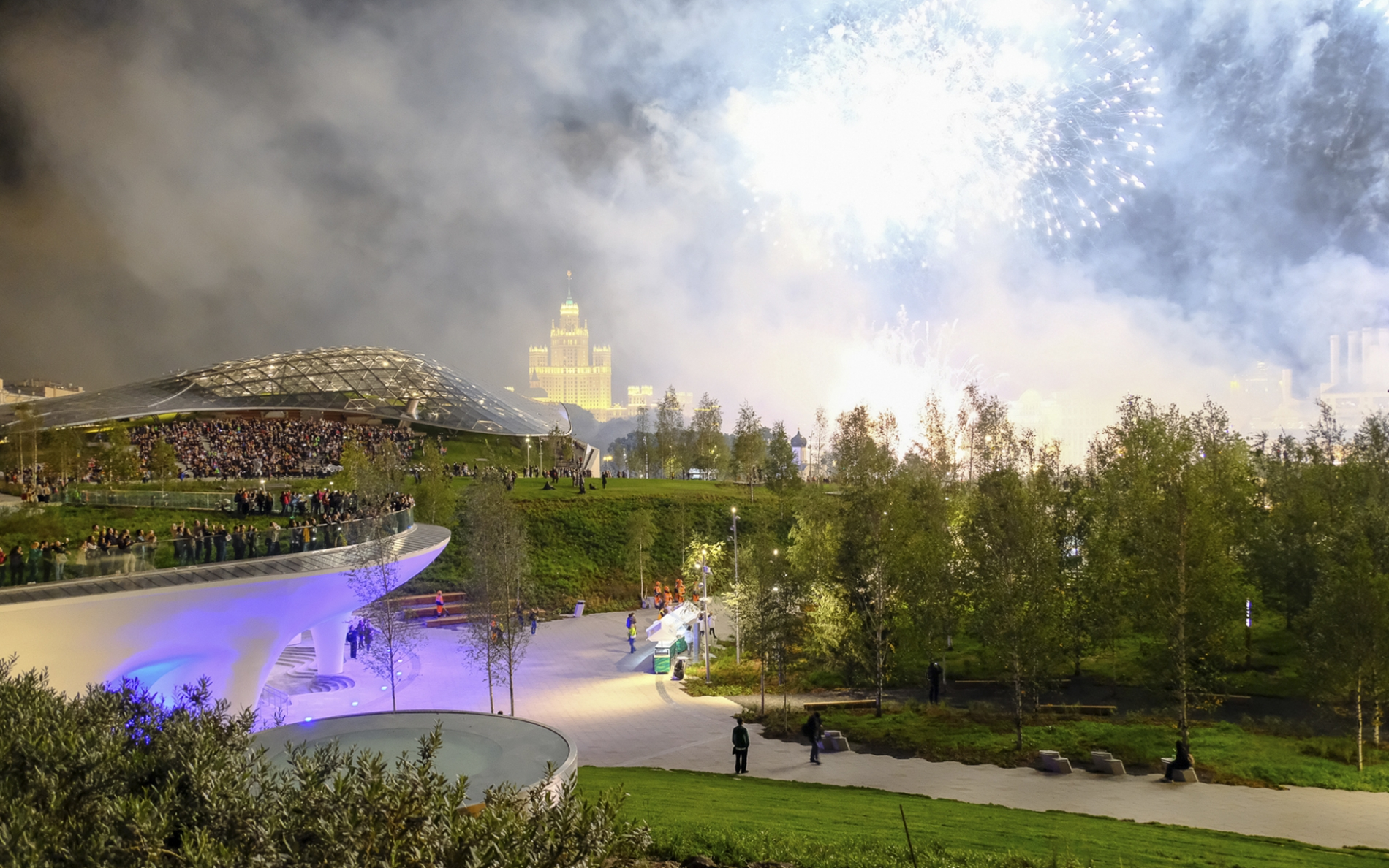

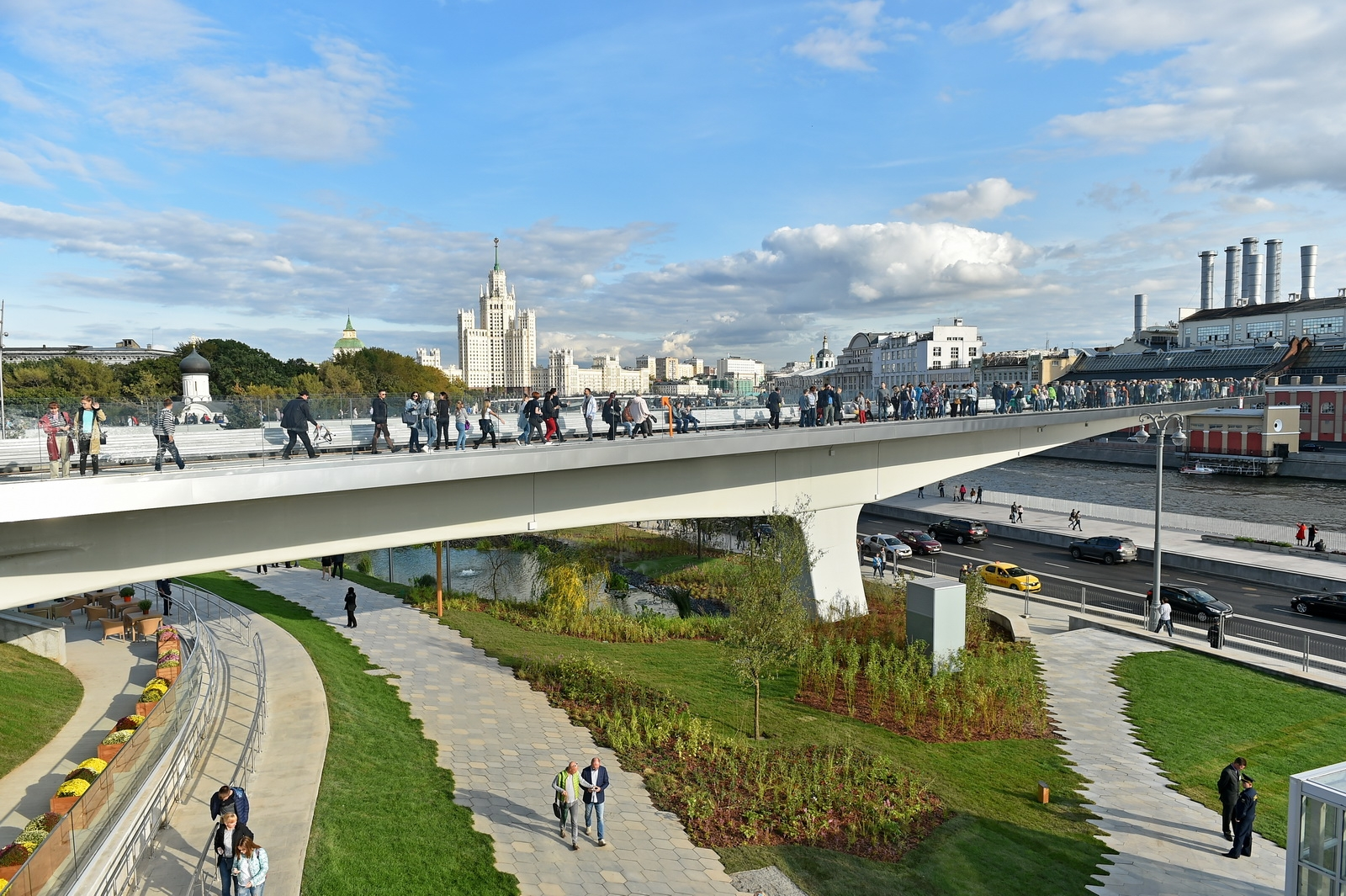

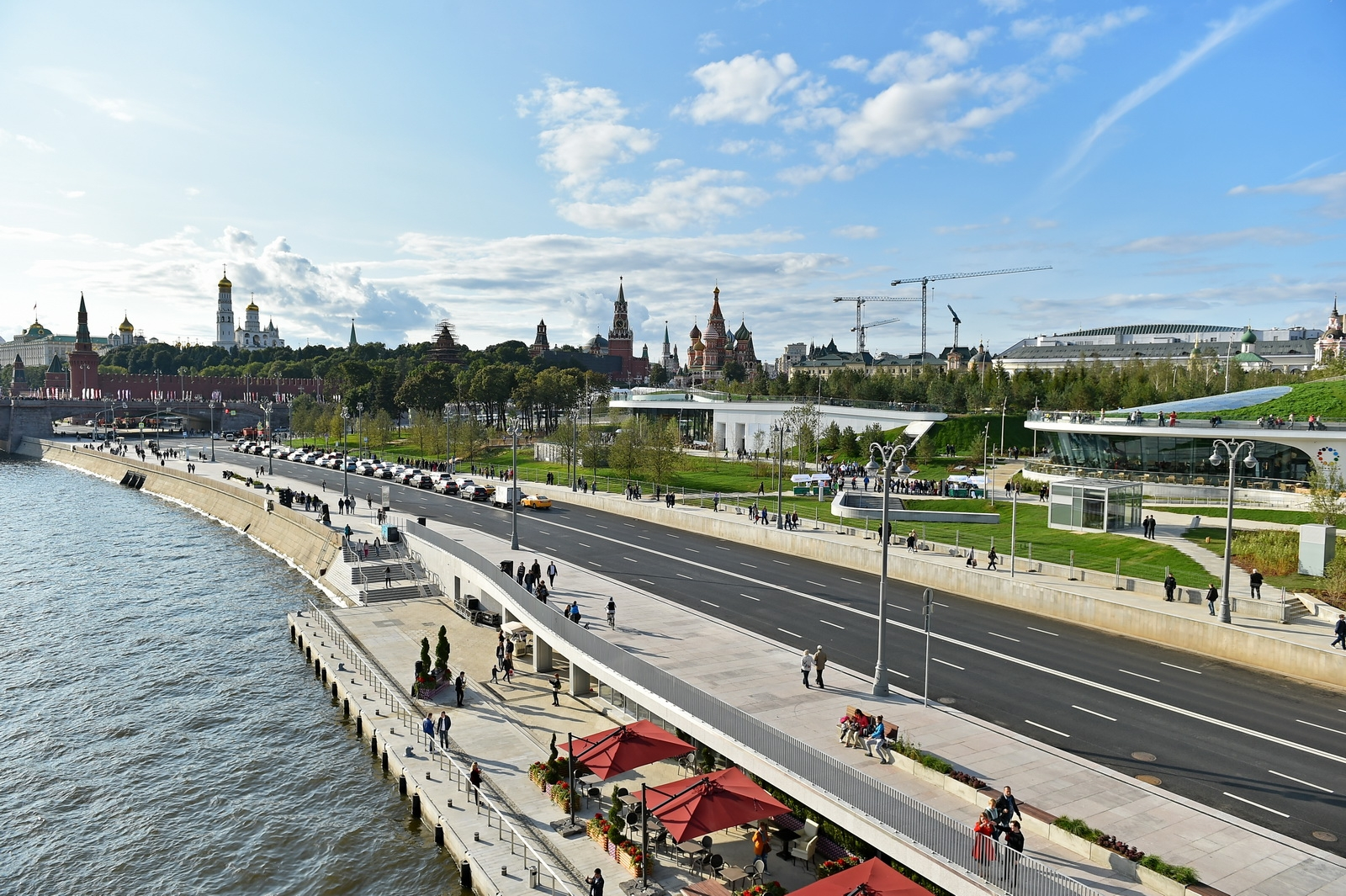

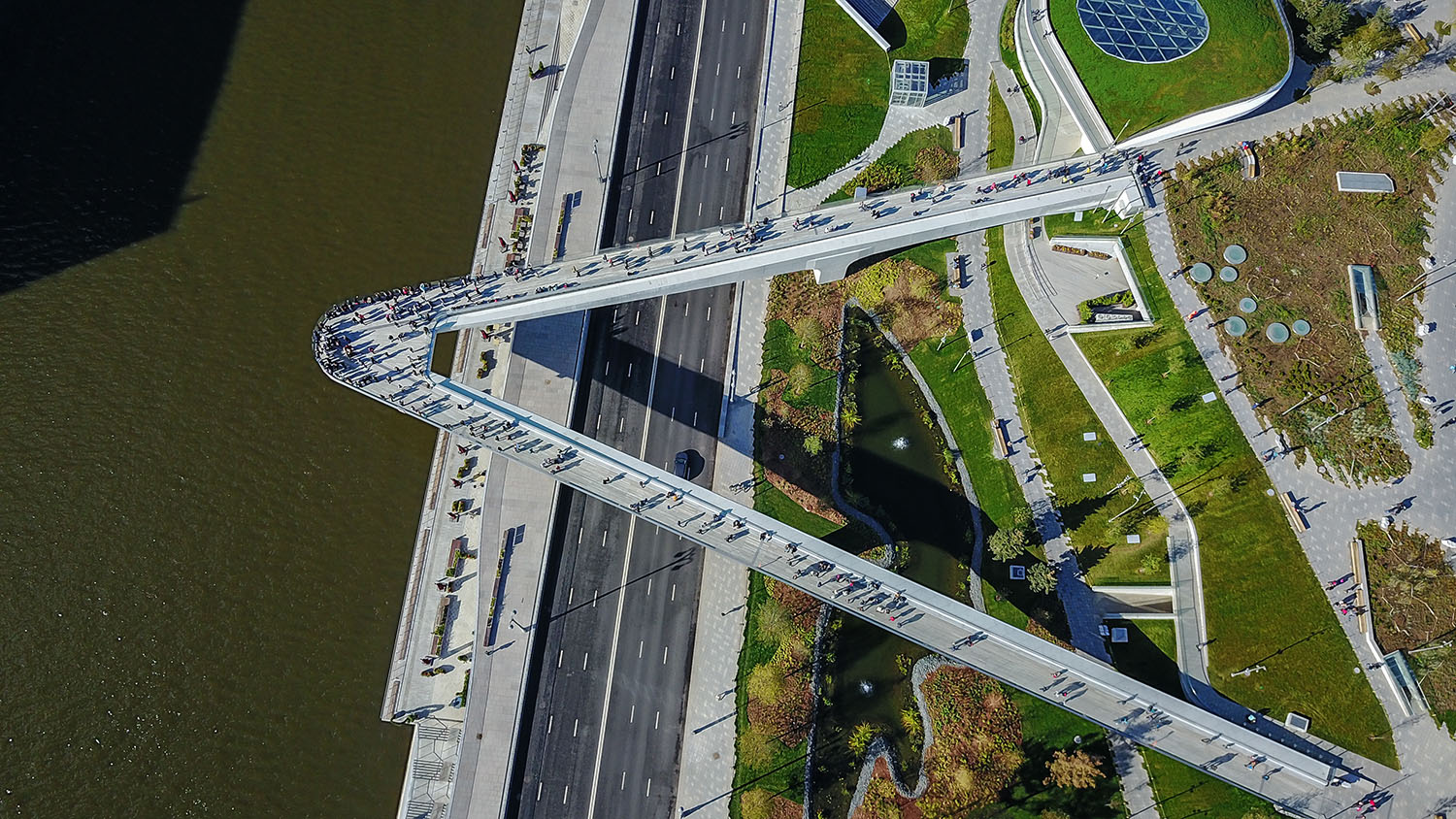

== See also ==
- List of tourist attractions in Moscow
- Kitay-gorod
