= Kotelnicheskaya Embankment Building =

Stalinist skyscraper in Russia

- Котельническая набережная
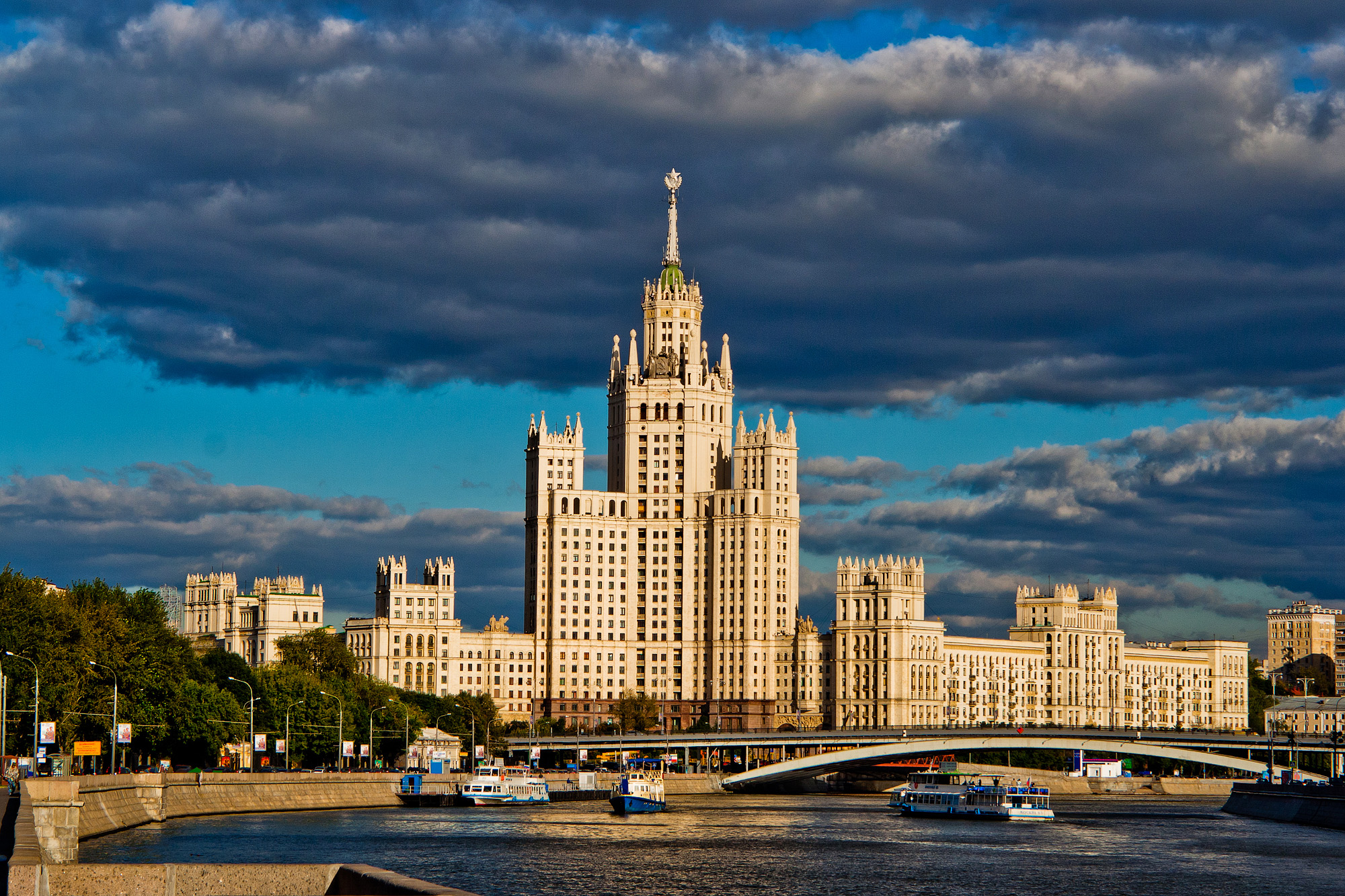

General information
- Architectural style: Stalinist
- Location: Tagansky District, Moscow, Russia
- Coordinates: 55°44′50″N 37°38′34″E
- Completed: 1952

Height
- Architectural: 176 m (577 ft)

Technical details
- Floor count: 32

Design and construction
- Architects: Dmitry Chechylin, Andrei Rostkovsky

Kotelnicheskaya Embankment Building is one of seven Stalinist skyscrapers laid down in September 1947 and completed in 1952, designed by Dmitry Chechulin (then Chief Architect of Moscow) and Andrei Rostkovsky. The main tower has 32 levels (including mechanical floors) and is 176 metres (577 ft) tall. At the time of construction it was the tallest building in Europe.

The building also incorporates a 9-story apartment block facing Moskva River, designed by the same architects in 1938 and completed in 1940. Initially built in stern early Stalinist style, with wet stucco wall finishes, it was re-finished in terracotta panels in line with the central tower and acquired ornate pseudo-Gothic crowns over its 12-story raised corners and center tower. By the end of World War II, the side wing was converted to multi-family kommunalka housing, in contrast to the planned elite status of the central tower.

The central tower, of a conventional steel frame structural type, has a hexagonal cross-section with three side wings (18 stories, including two mechanical floors). While it is not exceptionally tall or massive, the "upward surge" of five stepped-up layers, from a flat 9-story side wing to the spire, gives the impression of a more massive structure. The structure hides behind itself a so-called "Shvivaya Gorka," a hill with historical architecture and a maze of steeply inclined streets. Chechulin was initially criticized for complete disregard of this area, but his bureaucratic influence brushed off any criticisms.

== Notable residents ==
Notable residents of the building include(d):

- Vasily Aksyonov
- Yuri Lyubimov
- Konstantin Paustovsky
- Faina Ranevskaya
- Igor Shuvalov
- Willi Tokarev
- Aleksandr Tvardovsky
- Galina Ulanova
- Andrey Voznesensky
- Yevgeny Yevtushenko
- Lyudmila Zykina

== Gallery ==
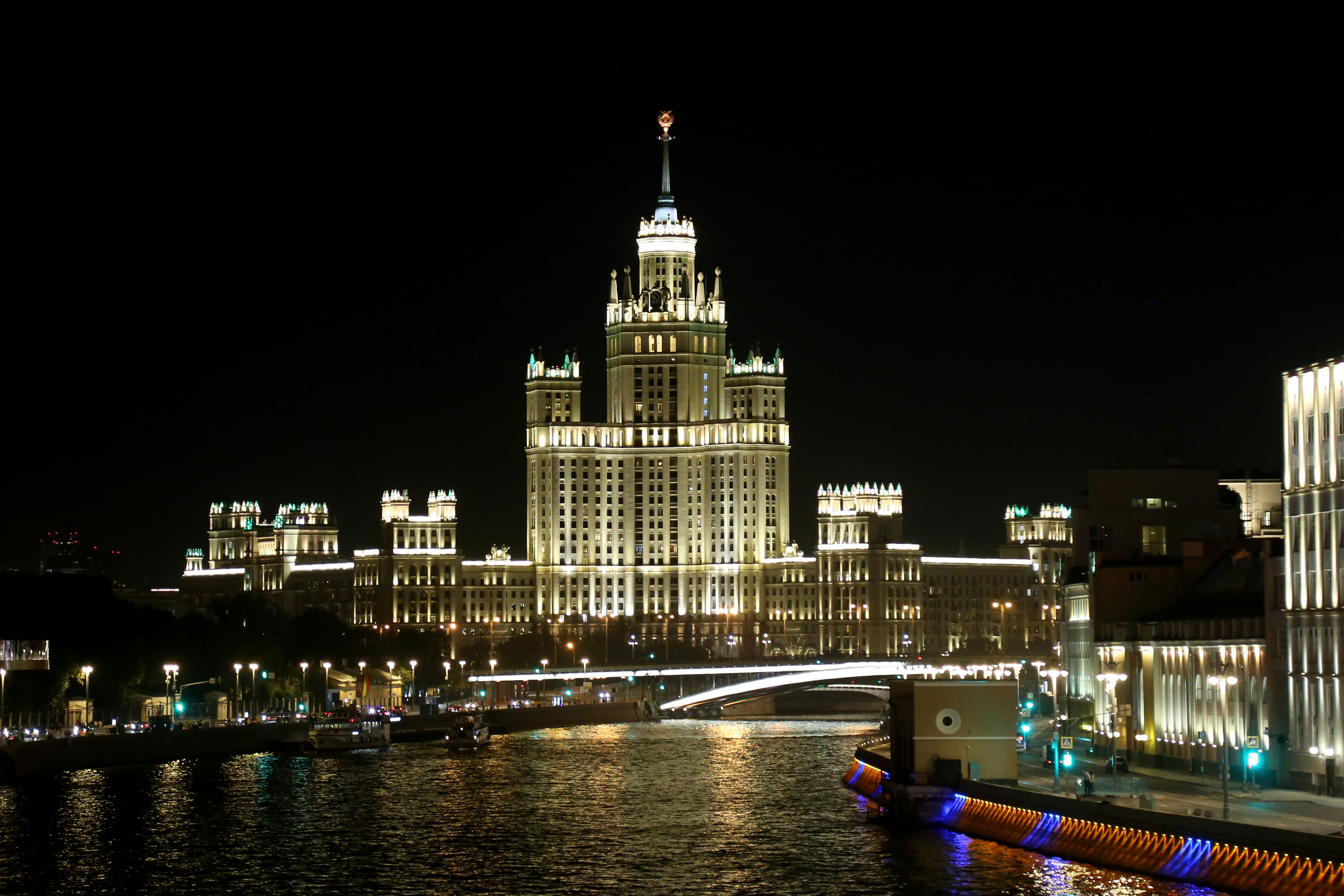
Kotelnicheskaya Embankment Building, Moscow, Russia

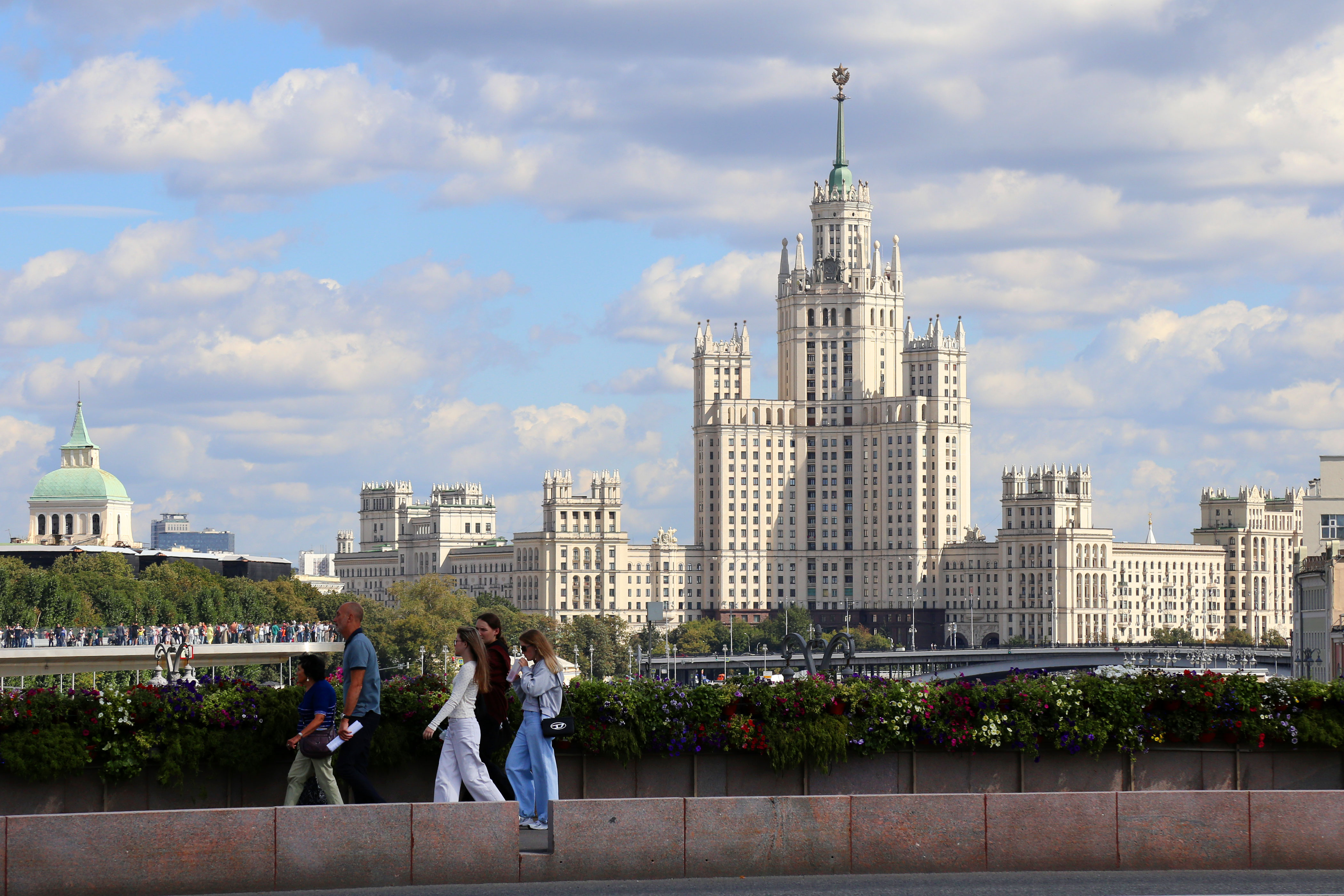
Kotelnicheskaya Embankment Building, Moscow, Russia

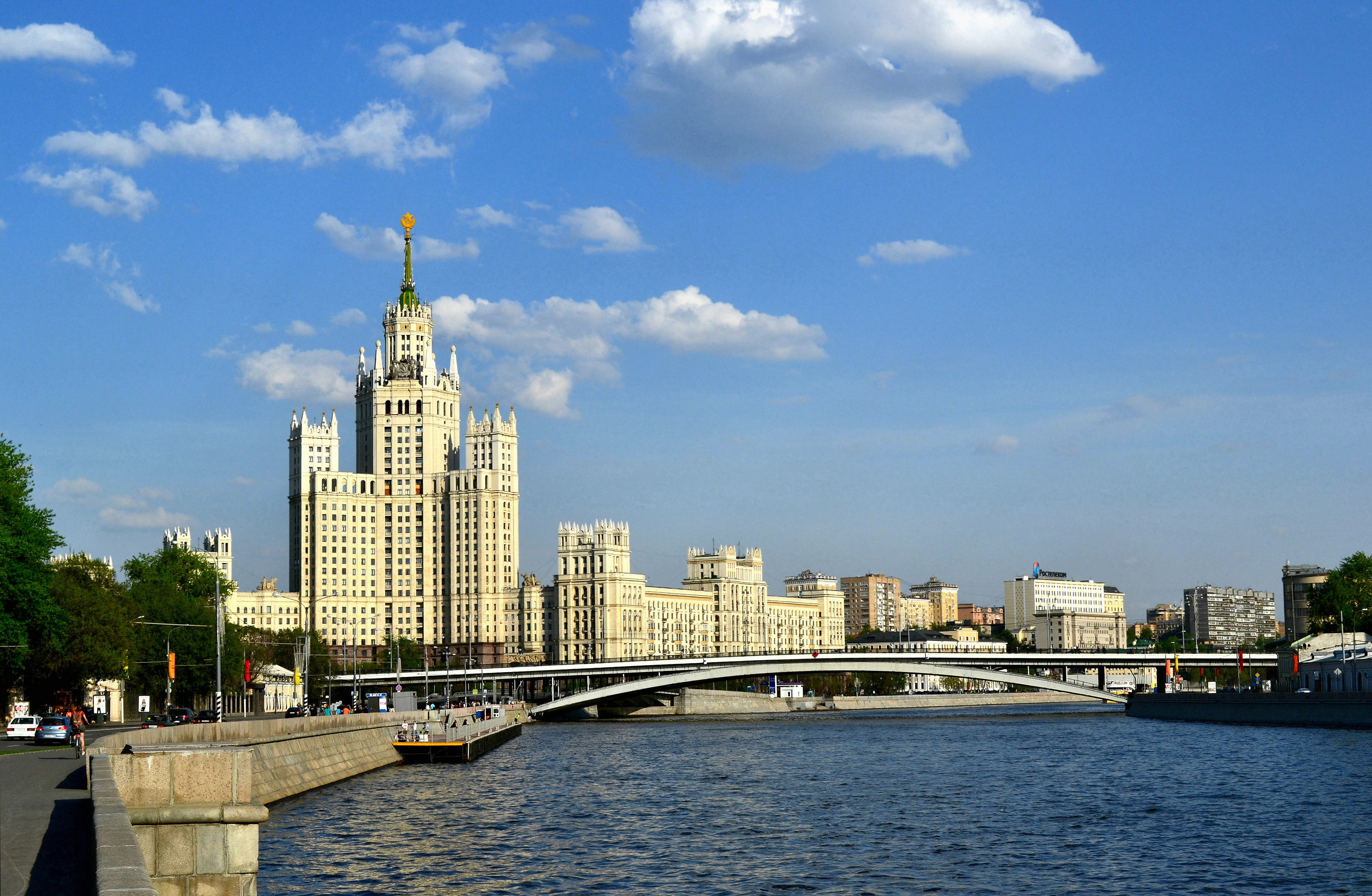
Kotelnicheskaya Embankment Building, Moscow, Russia

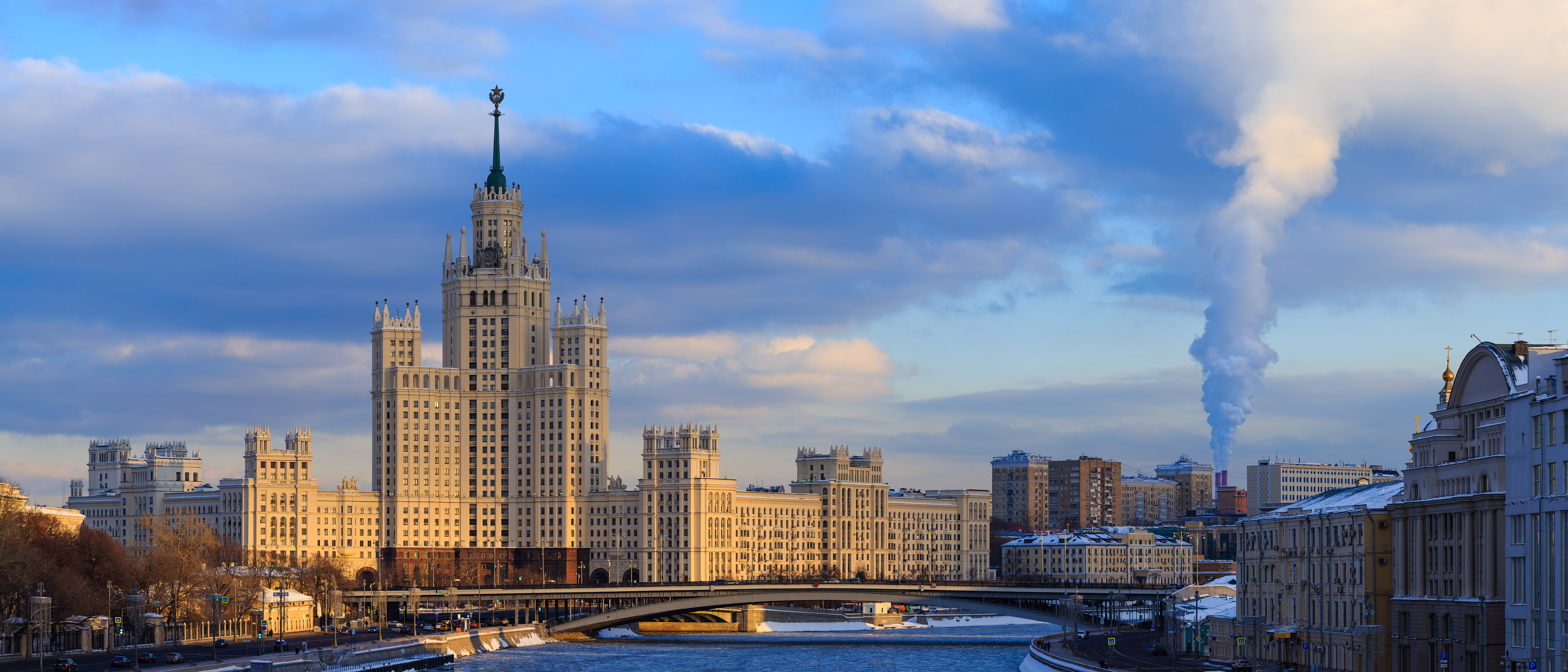
Kotelnicheskaya Embankment Building, Moscow, Russia

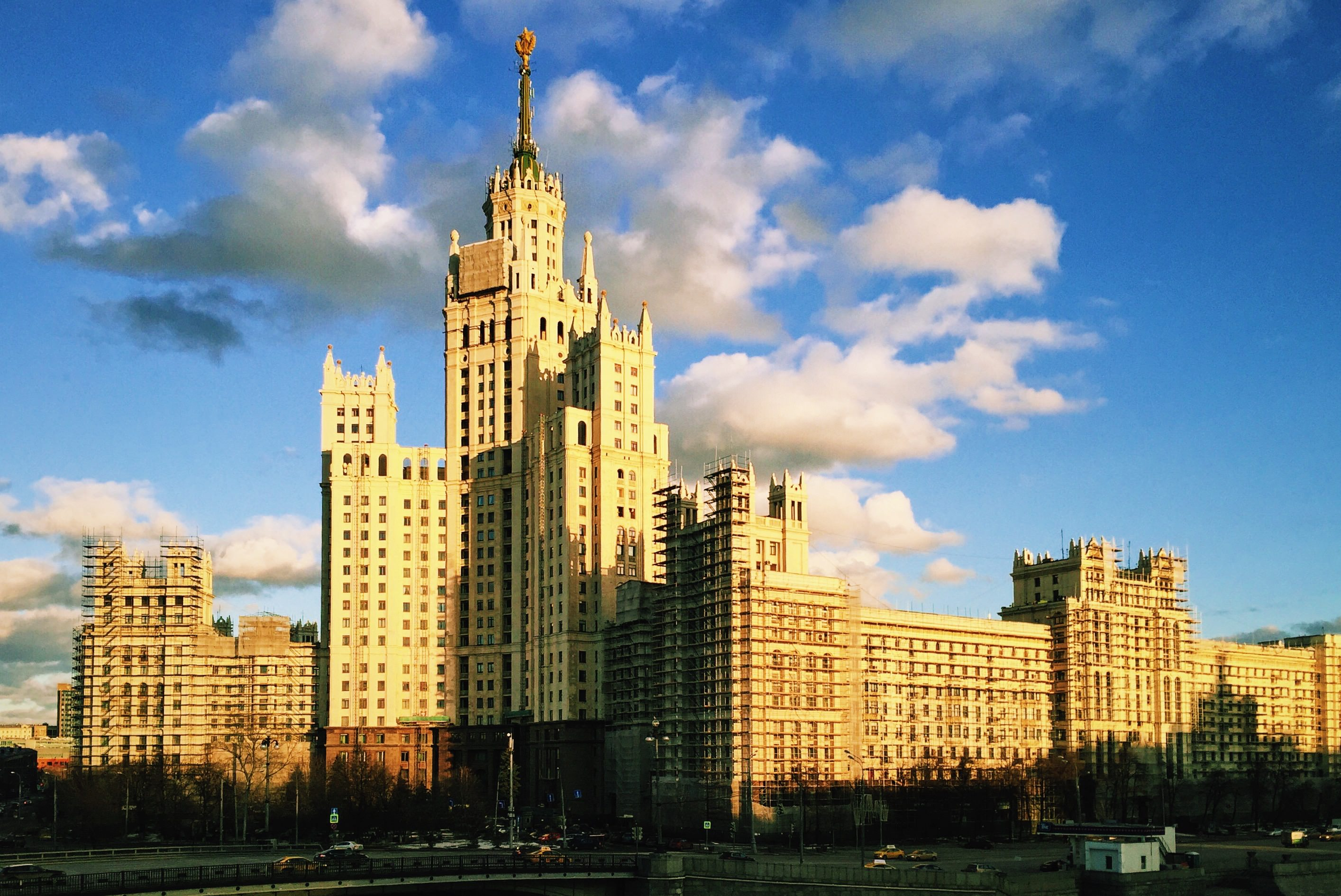
Kotelnicheskaya Embankment Building, Moscow, Russia

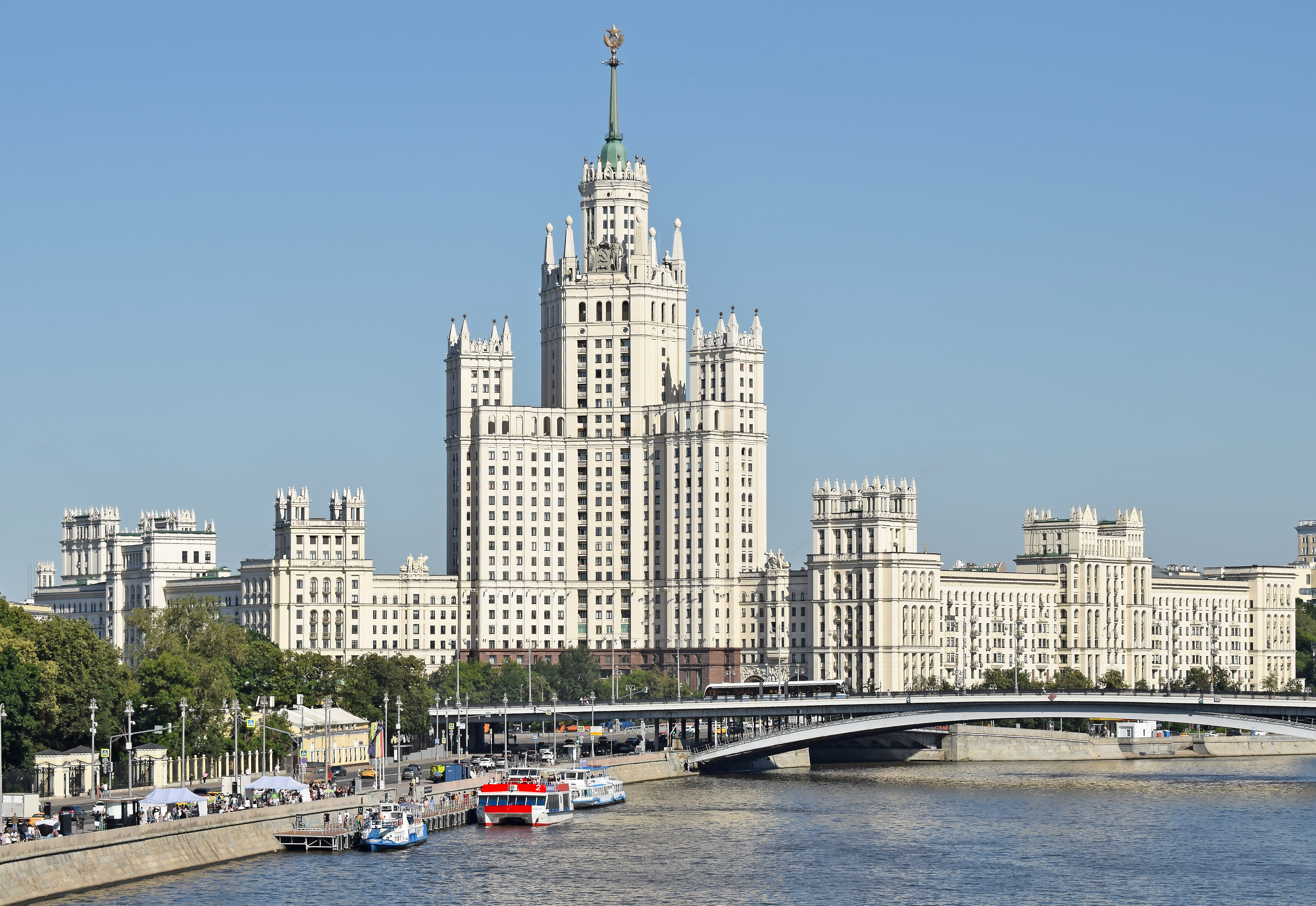
Kotelnicheskaya Embankment Building, Moscow, Russia

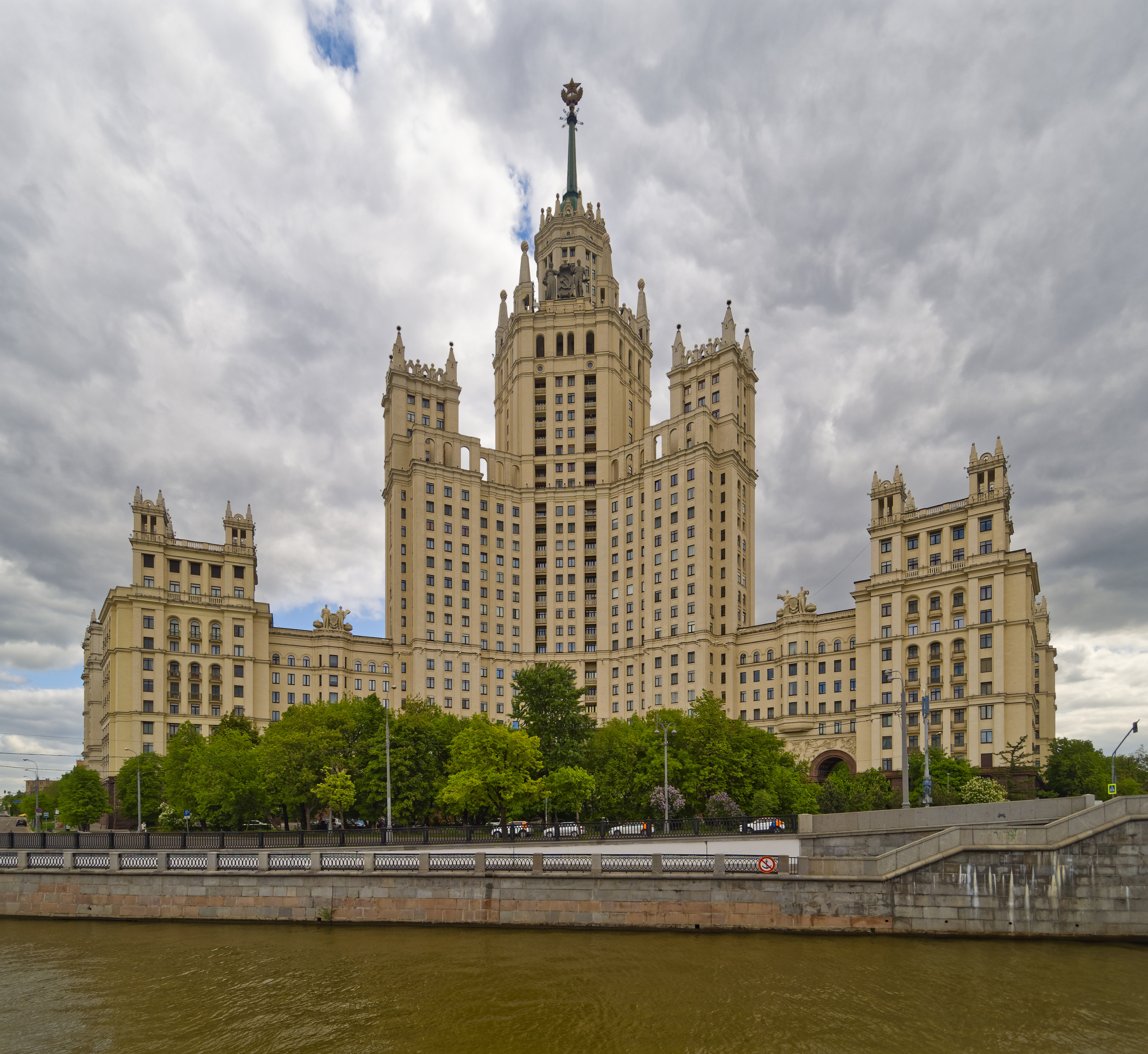
Kotelnicheskaya Embankment Building, Moscow, Russia

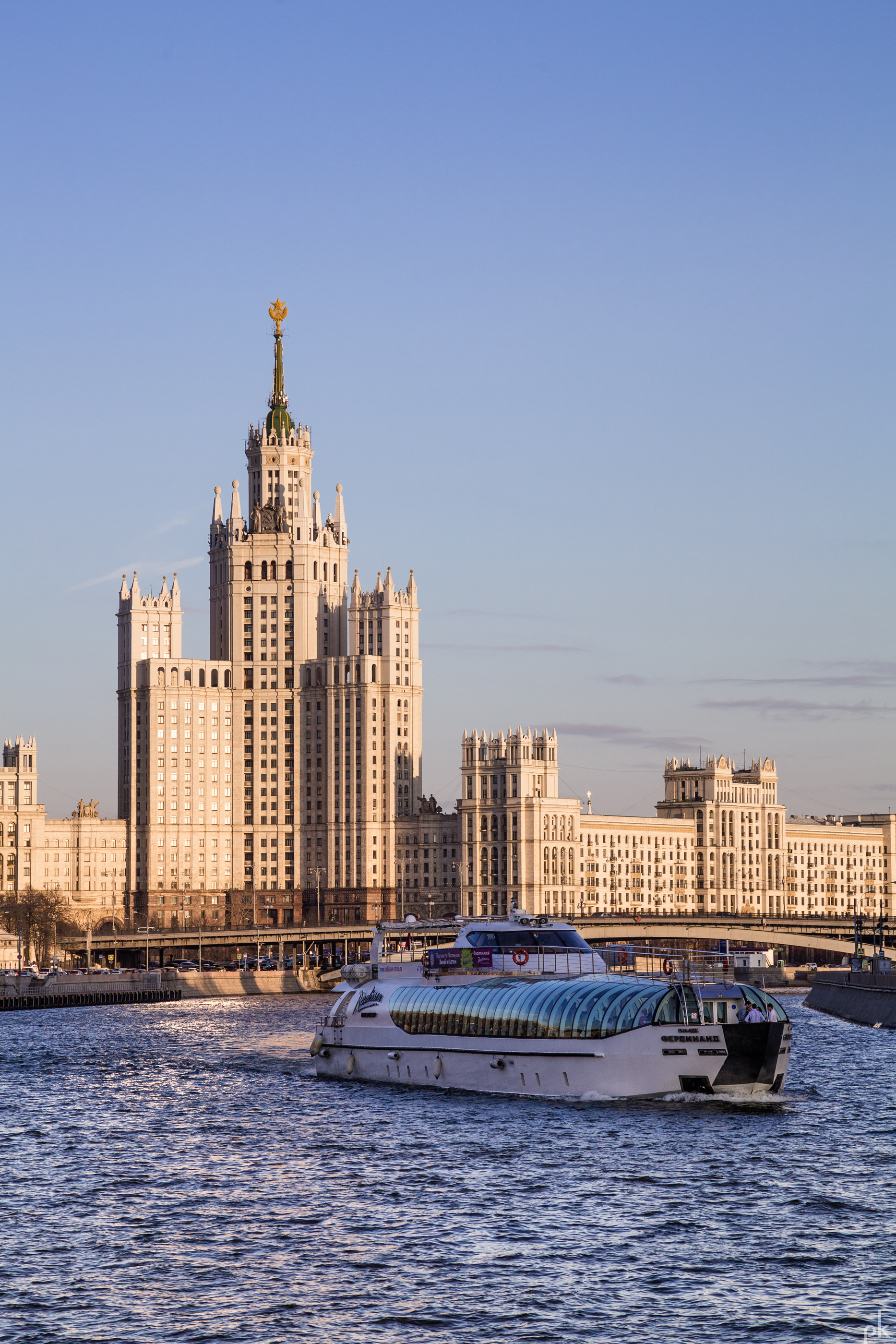

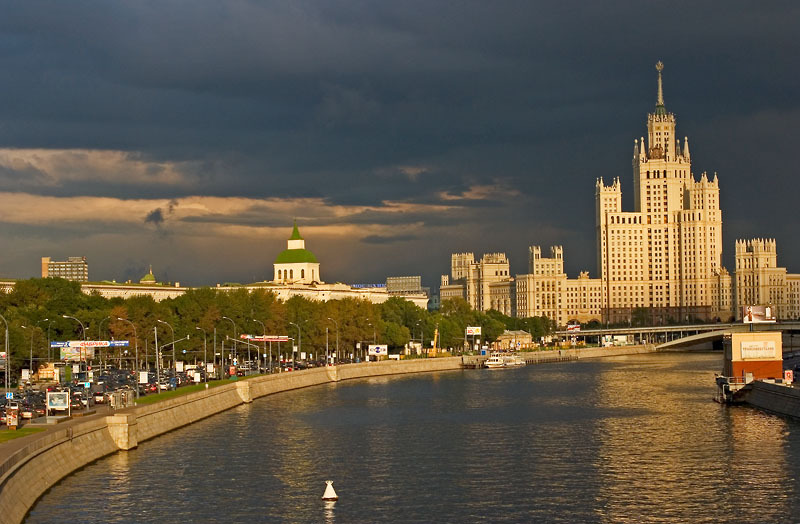
Kotelnicheskaya Embankment Building, Moscow, Russia

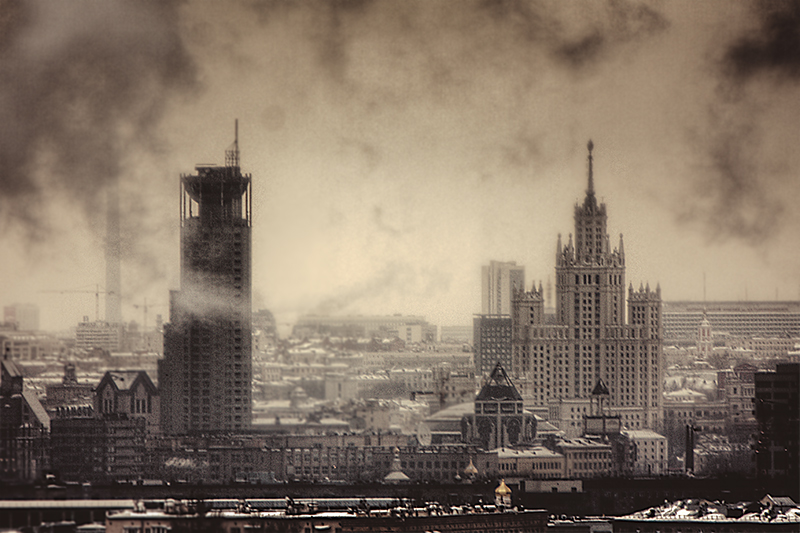

== Notes ==
Records
Preceded by River House Apartments	Tallest Residential Building in the World; 1952—1964; 176 m	Succeeded by 1000 Lake Shore Plaza
Preceded by Peter and Paul Cathedral	Tallest Building in the Soviet Union; 1952—1953; 176 m	Succeeded by Main building of Moscow State University
Preceded by Peter and Paul Cathedral	Tallest Building in the Russian SFSR; 1952—1953; 176 m	Succeeded by Main building of Moscow State University
Preceded by Ivan the Great Bell Tower	Tallest Building in Moscow; 1952—1953; 176 m	Succeeded by Main building of Moscow State University
Preceded by Terrazza Martini Tower	Tallest Building in Europe; 1952—1953; 176 m	Succeeded by Main building of Moscow State University
