= Kotelnicheskaya Embankment =

Street in Moscow, Russia

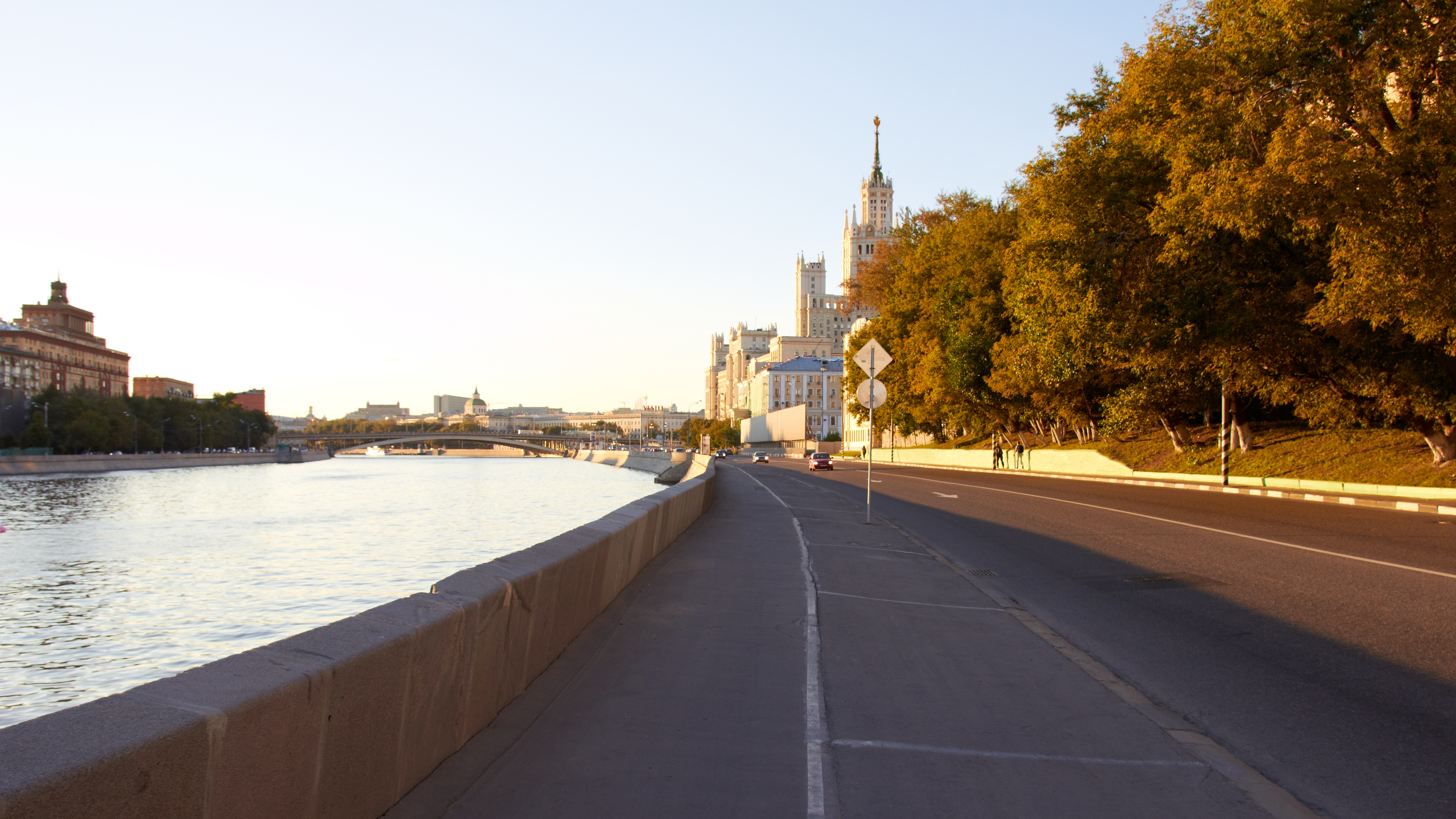

Kotelnicheskaya Embankment (Russian: Котельническая набережная) is a street on the northern bank of Moskva River in central Tagansky District of Moscow, Russia. It spans from the mouth of Yauza River (west) to the point one block west from Bolshoy Krashokholmsky Bridge (east), where it changes name to Goncharnaya Embankment. Kotelnicheskaya Embankment is also famous for its high rise building, one of the Seven Sisters of Moscow built during the Stalin era.

== See also ==
- Kotelnicheskaya Embankment Building
