= 1000 Lake Shore Plaza =

Skyscraper in Chicago, Illinois

Coordinates: 41.901°N 87.6245°W

- Interactive map of the 1000 Lake Shore Plaza area

General information
- Location: 1000 North Lake Shore Plaza, Chicago, Illinois
- Completed: 1964

Height
- Roof: 590 ft (180 m)

Technical details
- Floor count: 55

Design and construction
- Architect: Sidney Morris

1000 Lake Shore Plaza is a 590 ft (180m) tall skyscraper in Chicago, Illinois. It was completed in 1964 and has 55 floors. Sidney Morris designed the building, which is the 47th tallest in Chicago. When it was completed, it was claimed as the tallest reinforced concrete building in the world, but the Tour de la Bourse in Montreal was completed the same year, thus taking the title. The tower was also the tallest building in Chicago with balconies until the Park Tower was completed in 1999.

== See also ==
- List of tallest buildings in Chicago
