= Bolshoy Ustinsky Bridge =

Steel arch bridge in Moscow, Russia

Coordinates: 55°44′49″N 37°38′19″E

Bolshoy Ustinsky Bridge (Russian: Большой Устьинский мост) is a steel arch bridge that spans Moskva River near the mouth of Yauza River, connecting the Boulevard Ring with Zamoskvorechye district in Moscow, Russia. It was completed in May 1938 by V.M.Vakhurkin (structural engineering), G.P.Golts and D.M.Sobolev (architectural design).

It is surrounded by three lesser bridges, two across Yauza and one across Vodootvodny Canal: Maly Ustinsky Bridge, Astakhovsky (Yauzsky) Bridge, Komissariatsky Bridge, also described on this page.

== History ==
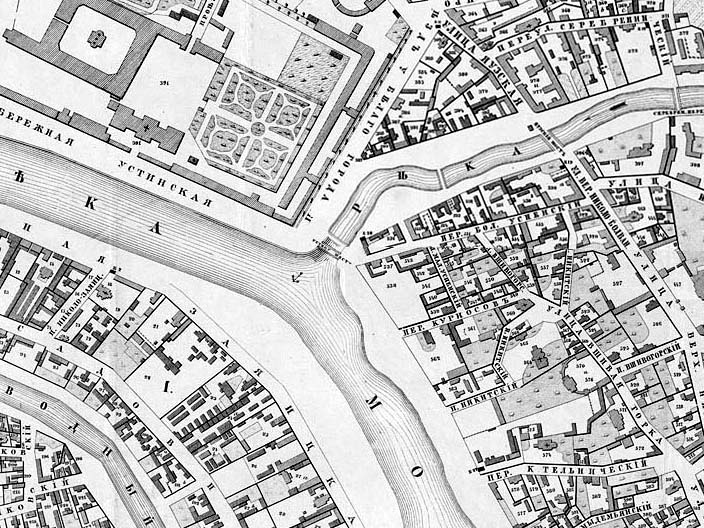
Site of Ustinsky Bridges, 1853, from Khotev's Atlas. Large structure in upper left quarter is Foundling House (The Orphanage, 1763-1770)

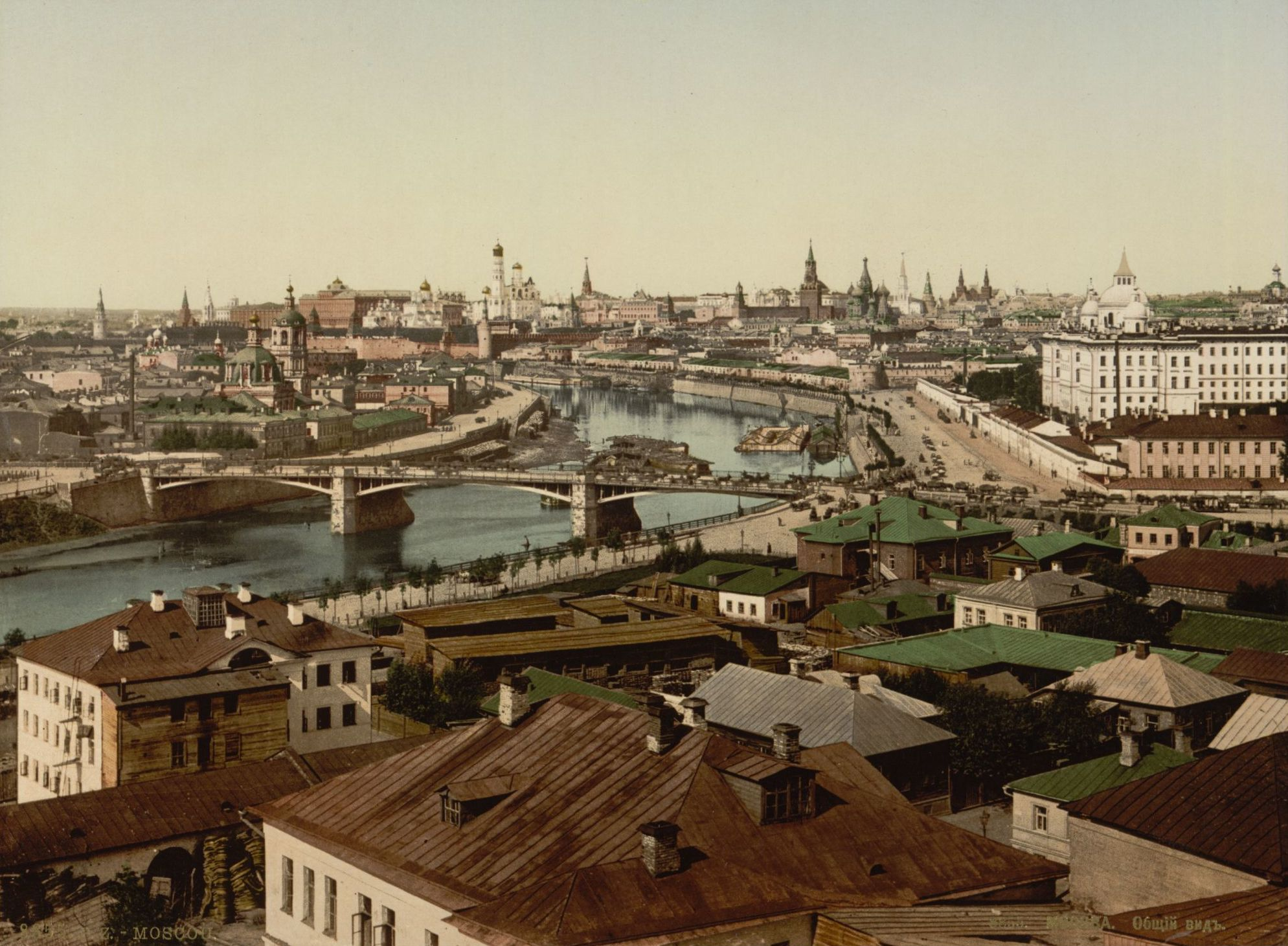
View of 1881 Ustinsky Bridge, Orphanage, and Kremlin. Postcard from a photograph made before 1887, when the First electrical powerplant (MoGes One) was built

The first Ustinsky Bridge across Moskva River was built in 1881, to a very common triple-span arch design by V.N.Speyer. Three spans were 39.5, 44.5 and 39.5 meters long and 19.2 meters wide (4 lanes, including two tram tracks); each span was suspended by 12 riveted arches. All downtown bridges built in 1880-1911 over Moskva River followed this triple-span shape; none survived in their original shape (Borodinsky and Novospassky still stand on original pylons, but arches were replaced with plate girders). As the archive photo shows, bridge and embankment traffic cross each other in the same level. This was probably the most important reason for replacing the bridge in the 1930s (others being insufficient width and shipping clearance).

Lower Yauza river had numerous bridges, dams and water mills since Middle Ages. The 1853 city plan shows a total of four such crossings. One was eventually demolished without replacement, three others correspond (west to east) to present-day Maly Ustinsky, Astakhovsky (Yauzsky) and Tessinsky bridges. Most important of these, Yauzsky Bridge, connecting city center with eastbound roads, was rebuilt in stone in 1804. In 1812, it was in the path of retreating Russian Army when it evacuated Moscow after Battle of Borodino. Yauzsky Bridge was renamed Astakhovsky after I.T.Astakhov, a steelworkers' leader killed on the bridge during a rally on February 28, 1917; this title remains official to date.

Before World War II, city planners intended to complete the Boulevard Ring with a link through Zamoskvorechye. This called for a bridge with higher traffic capacity, so a replacement Bolshoy Ustinsky bridge was built. Maly Ustinsky and Yauzsky (Astakhovsky) Bridge were also torn down and rebuilt to the same high capacity standard. Ring link was never completed; its planned outline can be vaguely traced by a chain of grand stalinist buildings near Tretyakovskaya metro station. Traffic through Bolshoy Ustinsky Bridge remains relatively low (unlike the busy Yauza bridges).

== Bolshoy Ustinsky Bridge (1938) ==
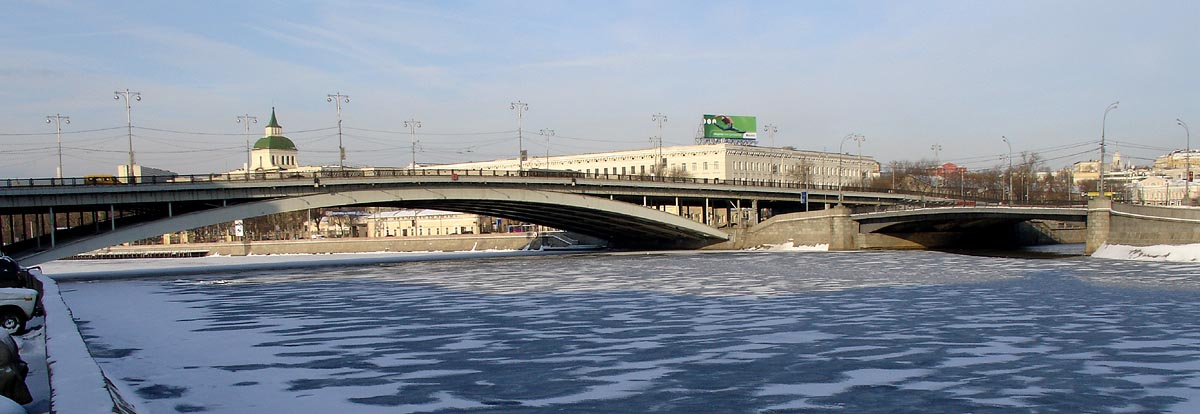
Bolshoy and Maly Ustinsky Bridges

The bridge is 40 meters wide and 478 meters long; main span is 134 meters long, having six parallel steel arches (span formula 50.5+134.0+50.5 meters). Orthotropic deck is supported by I-beams; there are six road lanes and two tram tracks on a raised divider. Two features make this bridge unique:

- There are no massive stone pillars: arches are set onto low pylons that do not protrude above street level. Each pylon rests on a flat slab measuring 31.2 by 40.0 meters.
- It is the only major downtown bridge that retains tram traffic (routes A, 3, 39 – the last and only tram line inside Garden Ring).

Bolshoy Ustinsky bridge was reconstructed in 1999-2000, replacing the roadway deck with an improved, lighter orthotropic type. It retained all original structural details.

== Komissariatsky Bridge (1927) ==
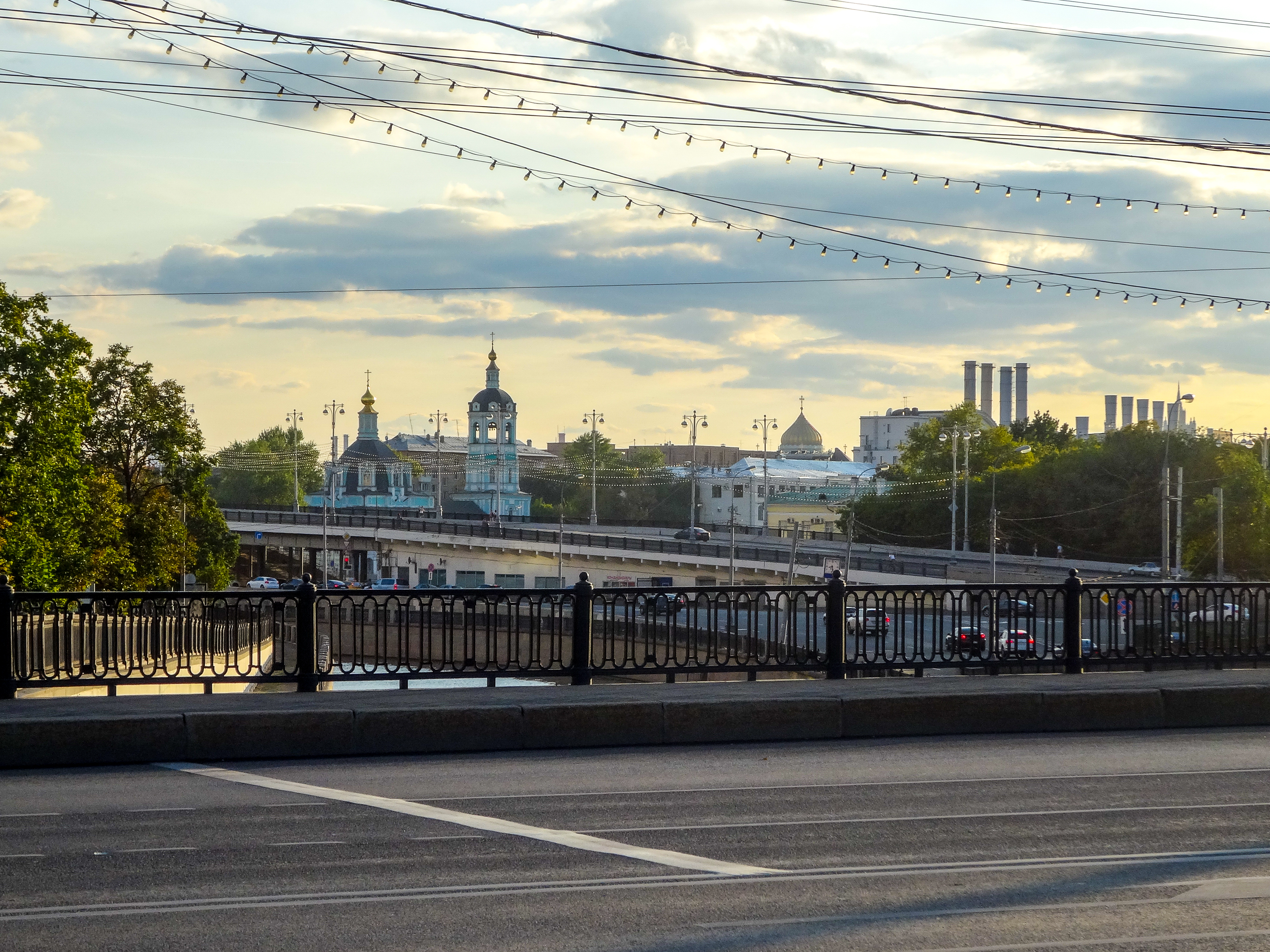
View from Astakhovsky Bridge to Bolshoy Ustyinsky Bridge. July 2014

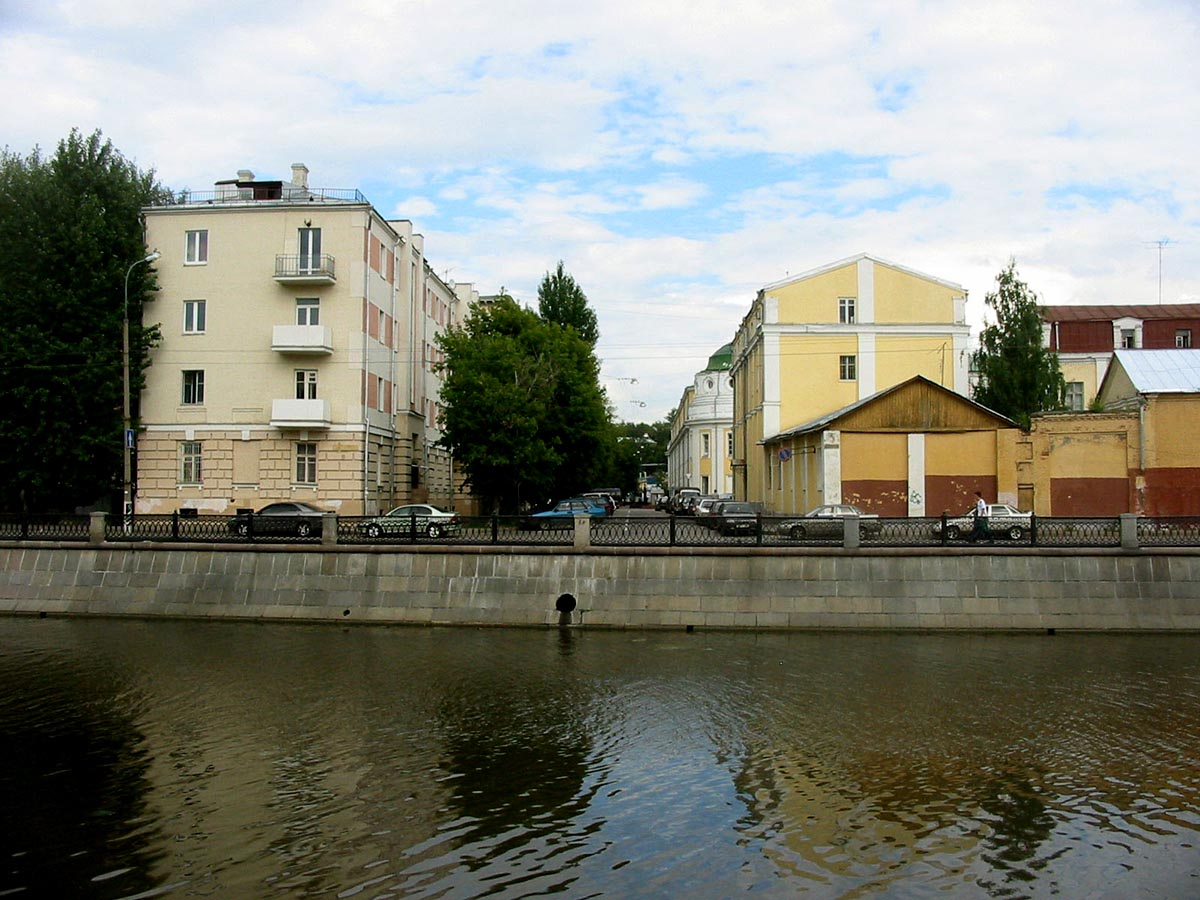
Looking north into Komissariatsky alley, exactly on the old site of Komissariatsky Bridge. Present-day bridge with the same name is 300 meters north-west (left)

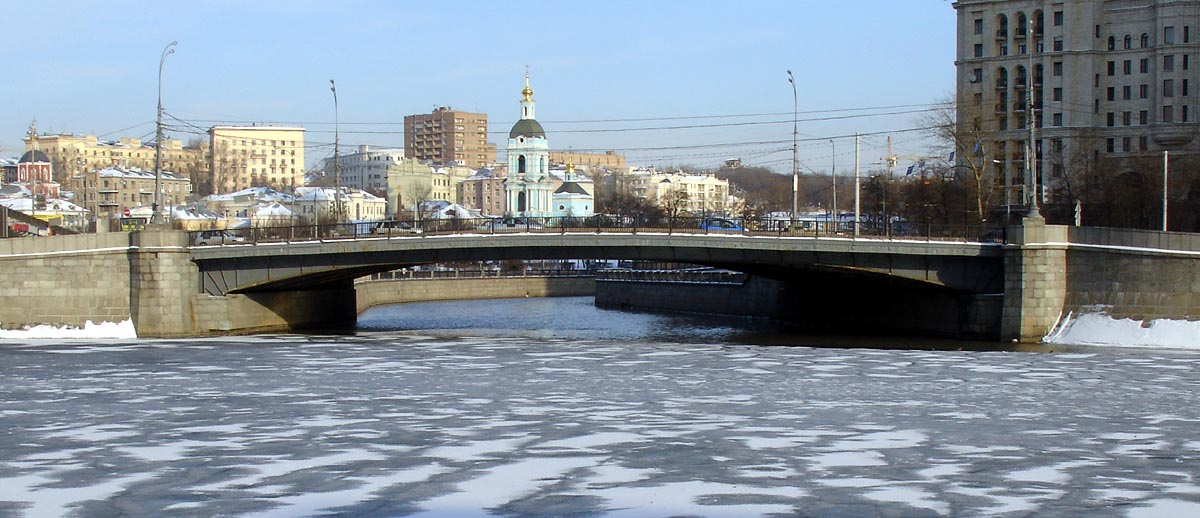
Maly Ustinsky Bridge

The first, wooden Komissariatsky Bridge (Комиссариатский мост) across Vodootvodny Canal existed since the 1850s, in line with Komissariatsky Lane. It was named after the nearby New Kriegskomissariat, a castle-like military depot (built 1778-1781); there is no relation to Red Commissars of 20th century.

Existing Komissariatsky Bridge continues the Bolshoy Ustinsky Bridge path across Vodootvodny Canal into Zamoskvorechye, 300 meters north-west from the old site. It was built in 1927 by Boris Tyazhelov (span 46 meters, width 19.4 meters, shallow concrete arch type). However, it was put to regular use (including trams) only in 1960.

== Maly Ustinsky Bridge (1938) ==
Spans right over the mouth of Yauza, continuing Moskvoretskaya Embankment into westward Kotelnicheskaya Embankment. Replaced the old steel bridge (1883). Built in 1938 by M.D.Gayvoronsky (structural engineering) and I.V.Tkachenko (architectural design). Total length 64.4 meters, width 40 meters (8 lanes), steel lattice type.

== Astakhovsky (Yauzsky) Bridge (1940) ==
Astakhovsky (Acтаховский) Bridge across Yauza was built in 1940 by I.N.Golbrodsky (structural engineering) and I.V.Tkachenko (architectural design) on the site of old Yauzsky Bridge (1804), 250 meters upstream from Yauza mouth. Total length 46.4 meters, width 36 meters (8 lanes), concrete lattice type.

== See also ==
- List of bridges in Moscow
- Seven Sisters
- Moscow Tram Photographs of Ustinsky and Komissariatsky bridges, 2000, soon after bridge reconstruction
