= Bolshoy Kamenny Bridge =

Deck arch bridge in Moscow, Russia

Coordinates: 55°44′48″N 37°36′44″E

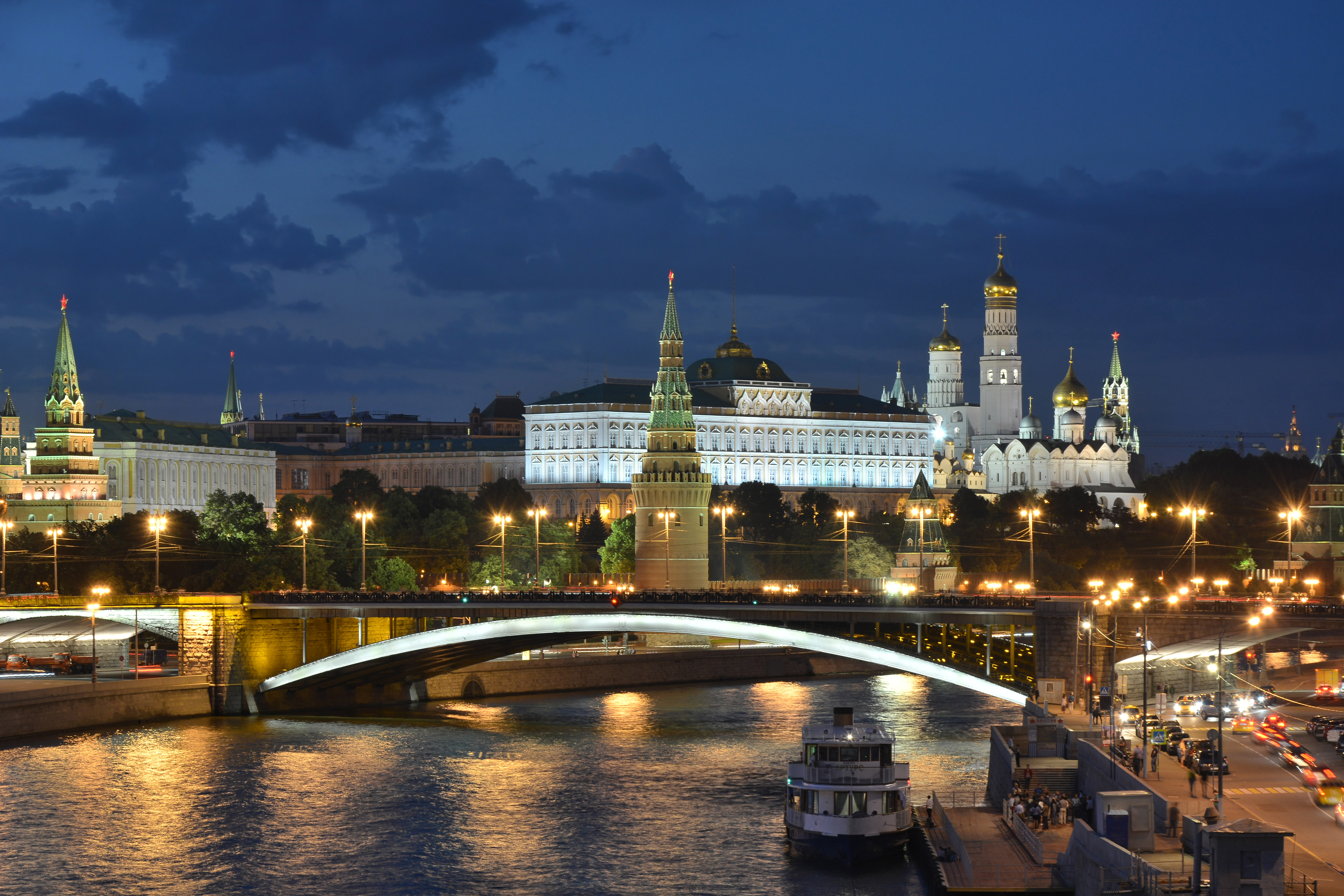
Existing bridge (July 2015)

Bolshoy Kamenny Bridge (Russian: Большой Каменный мост, Greater Stone Bridge) is a steel arch bridge spanning Moskva River at the western end of the Moscow Kremlin. Its predecessor was the first permanent stone bridge in Moscow, Russia. The existing bridge was completed in 1938 by engineer Nikolai Kalmykov.

== Bolshoy Kamenny Bridge (1692, demolished) ==
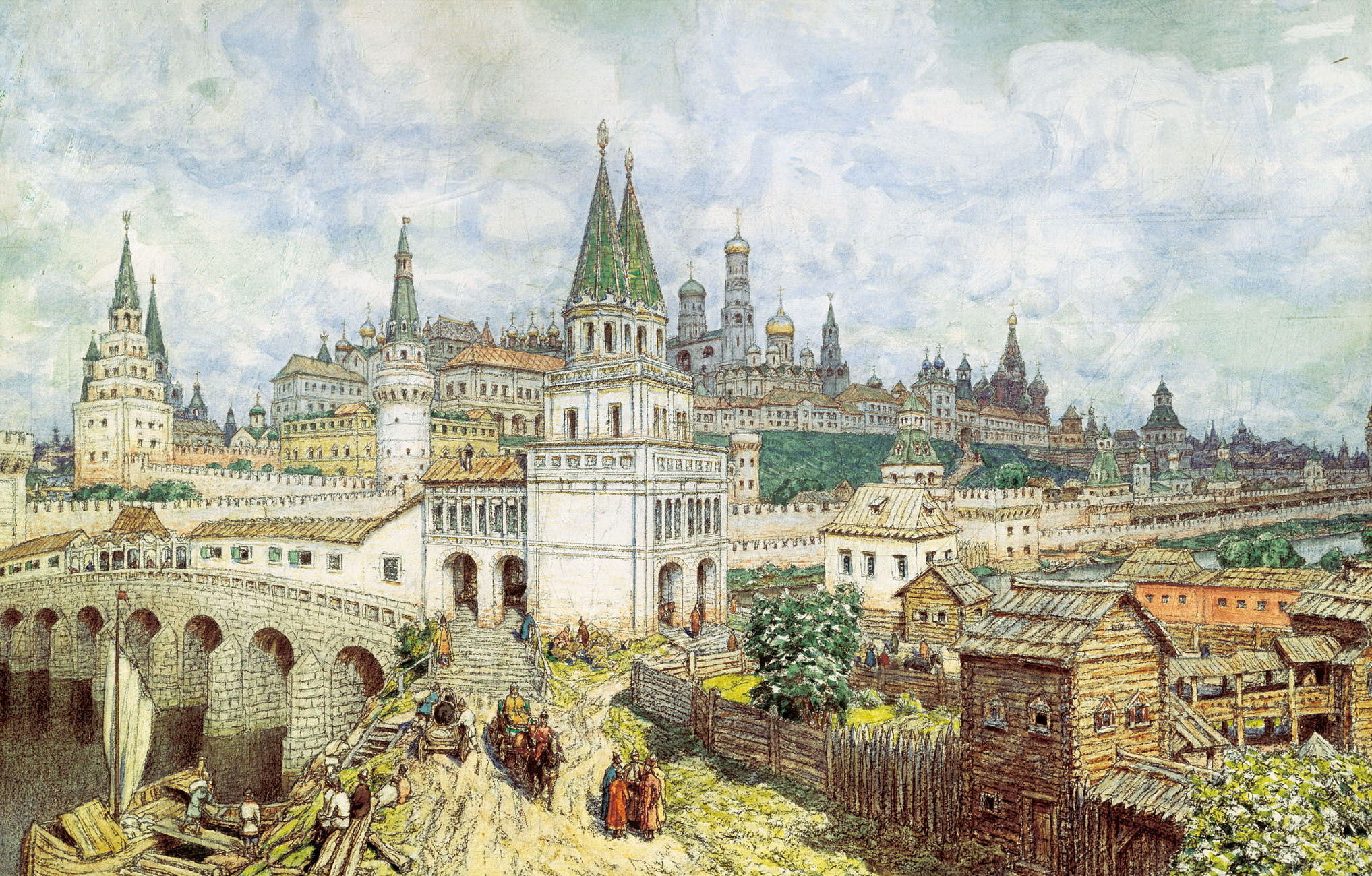
Vsehsvyatsky Bridge (All Saints Bridge, old name of Bolshoy Kamenny Bridge) and the Kremlin at the end of the 17th century. By Apollinary Vasnetsov, 1922

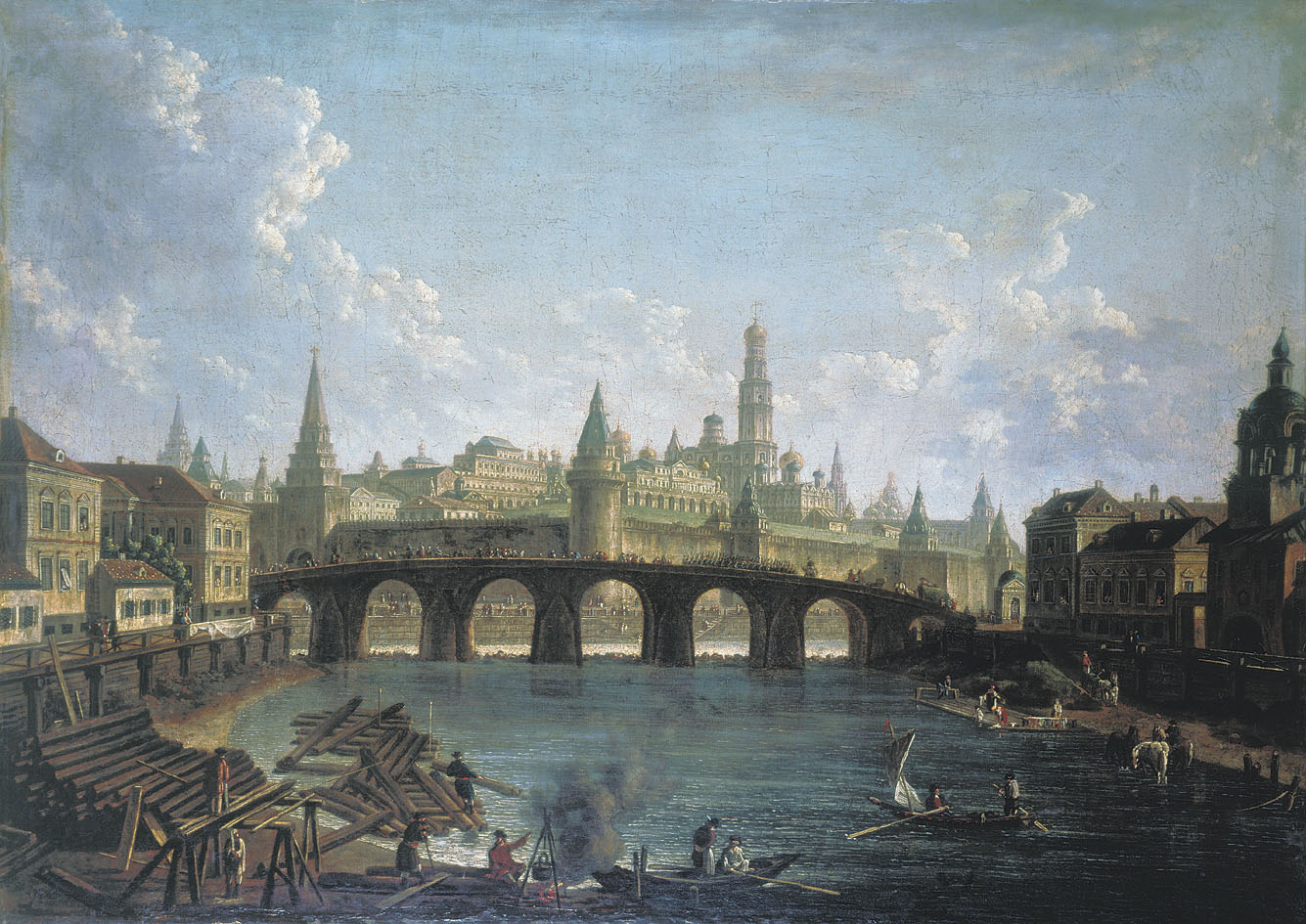
First Stone Bridge, as depicted by Fyodor Alekseev in the early 19th century. Note the space between the bridge and the corner Kremlin tower

A "live" bridge of boats linked the Kremlin with Zamoskvorechye on a nearby site as early as the 15th century. In 1643, Tsar Mikhail Feodorovich engaged Anie and Jogann Cristler, architects from Strassburg to design a stone bridge. Anie Cristler and Tsar Mikhail died in 1645, construction halted.

Sources about the completion of the first Stone Bridge are contradictory.

- The most widely accepted version attributes it to Patriarch Filaret, who picked up the job in 1682; year of completion is either 1687 or 1692.
- Another version connects the completion in 1687 with Vasily Golitsyn, notable for his sponsorship of architecture.

Archive studies by Ivan Kondratyev indicate that original draft had 5 main spans of 40 arshin each. Later, numerous repairs (1707, 1731, 1771, 1788–1792, 1809–1812) changed it to seven spans over eight stone pillars.

It is estimated that the river maximum width was 105 meters (50 sazhen), and overall length of the bridge was 70 sazhen, 11 sazhen wide. Its south end terminated with a barbican tower, commonly called Six Gates (two for through traffic, four looking sideways). This ornate tower is believed to be the first stone Triumph arch in Muscovy.

The bridge deck originally included wooden storehouses, mills, taverns and tax collector's booths. All of these additions were destroyed in 1785 by the governor's decree. Still, it remained a busy public square and a place for religious ceremonies. Police reported frequent illegal street races in troikas, which assembled thousands of bystanders; more races followed when a new and wider bridge was completed.

== Bolshoy Kamenny Bridge (1859, demolished) ==
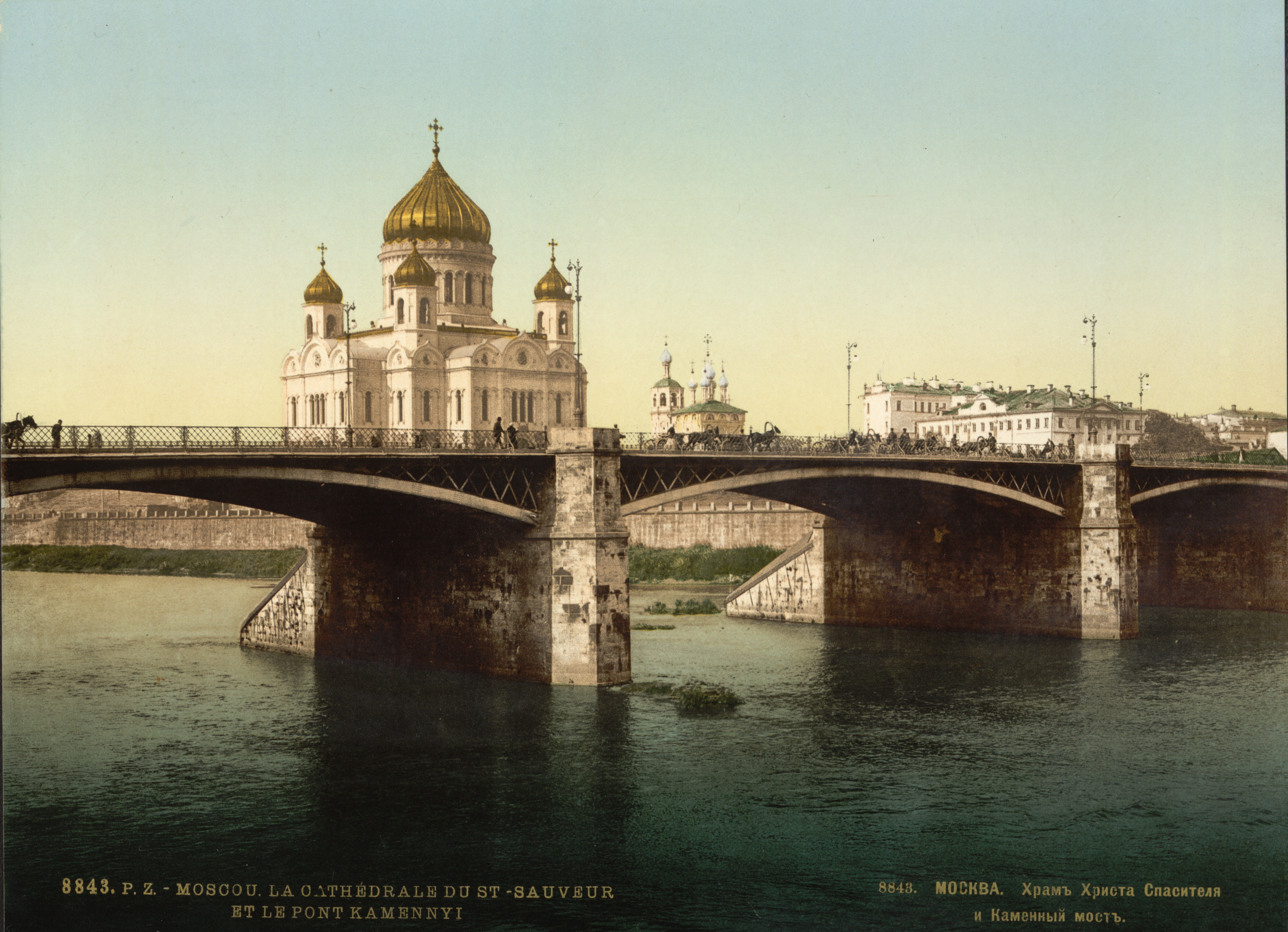
Second Stone Bridge, postcard

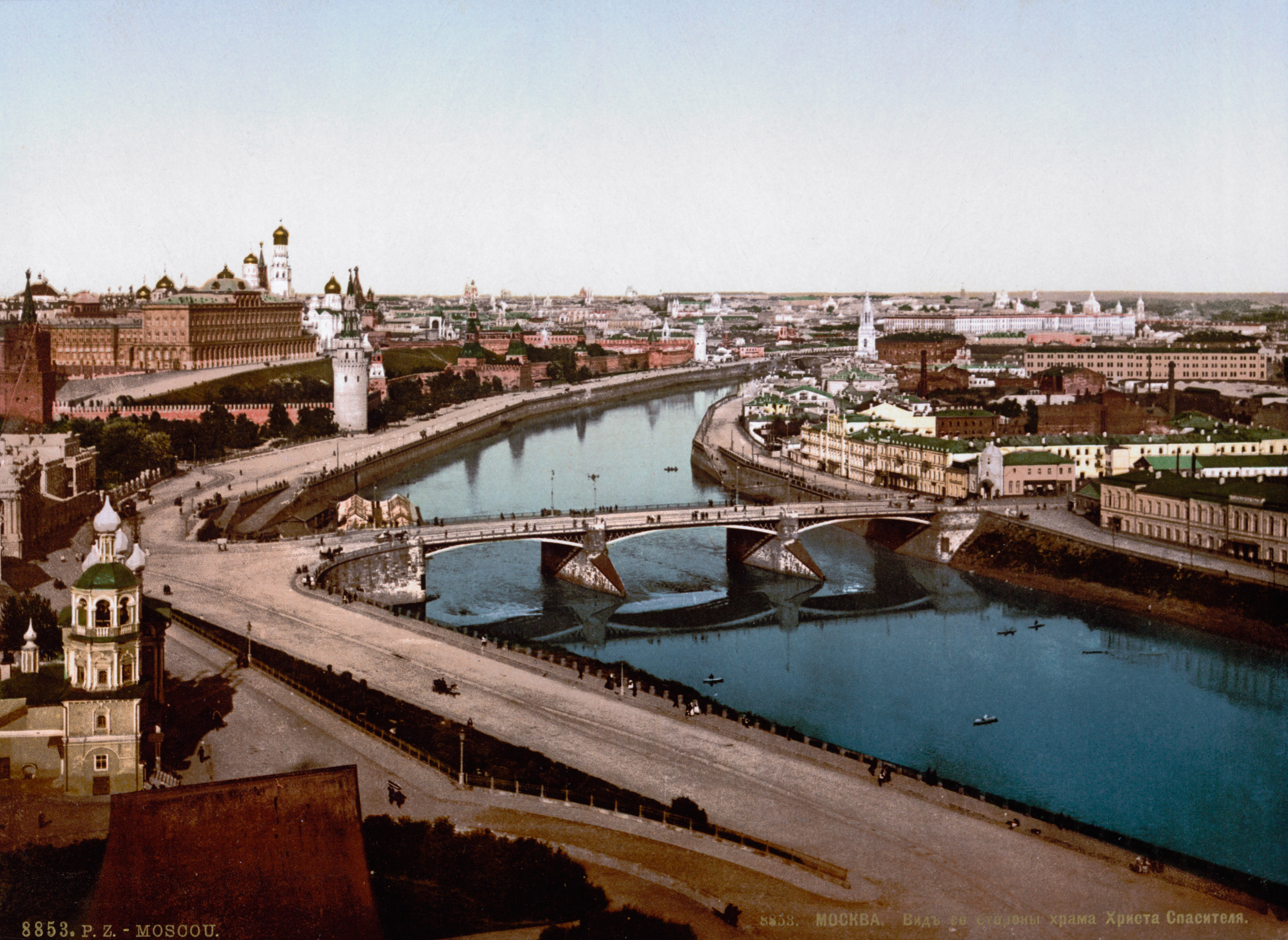
Second Stone Bridge, view from Christ the Savior

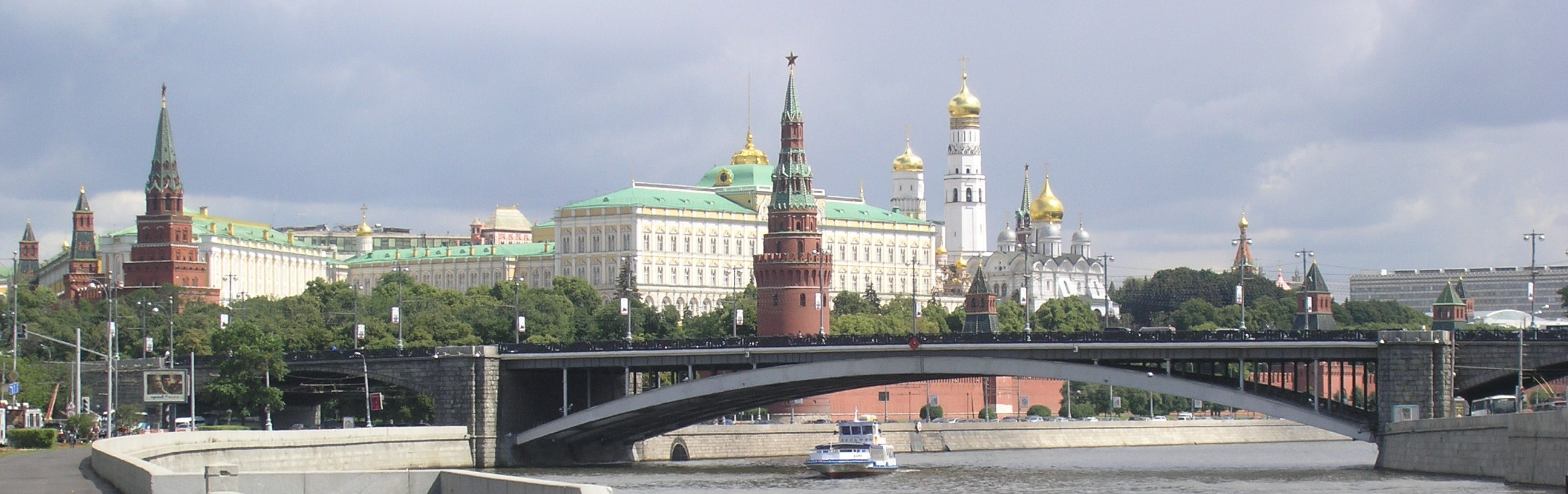
2008

The Second Stone Bridge was built in 1859 by colonel Tannenberg on the same site, in line with today's Lenivka Street. The new bridge had three steel arched spans (36+40+36 meters) on stone pillars, similar to still existing Novospassky Bridge and Borodinsky Bridge. The main drawback, compared to these later bridges, was that the Stone Bridge left no free passage for the traffic on embankments. Riverside traffic had to cross bridge traffic in the same level. This design error became a problem even before automobiles and this is why the Second Stone bridge was demolished in 1930s, while Novospassky Bridge still stands.

== Bolshoy Kamenny Bridge (1938) ==
The first contest for the Third Stone Bridge was held in 1921; none of the entries were selected. The second contest was won jointly by engineer Nikolai Kalmykov and Schuko-Gelfreikh-Minkus team of architects.

Kalmykov's design was completed in 1935-1938, on a site which is two blocks closer to Kremlin than the previous bridges. The single arched span is 105 meters wide and 8.4 meter high. A total of 6 parallel, boxed steel arches support the 40 meter wide roadway. The arch rests on submerged caisson foundations. Embankment traffic uses two 42.5 meter long side arches. Total length, including approach ramps, is 487 meters. There are 8 lanes for regular traffic and a divider lane.

== See also ==
- List of bridges in Moscow
