= List of bridges in Moscow =

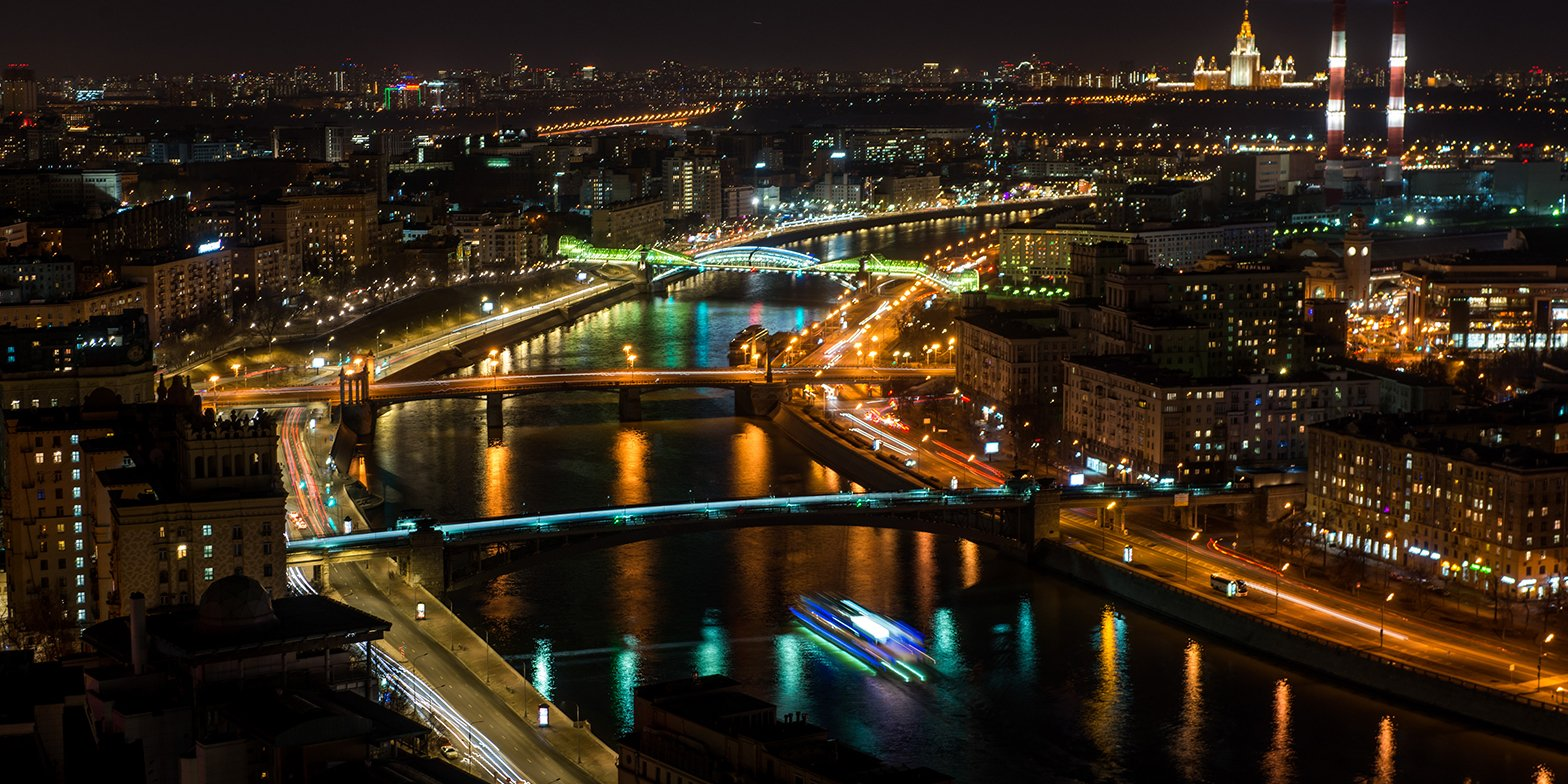
Bridges in Moscow

This is a partial list of bridges of Moscow, Russia, including existing rail, road and foot bridges over Moskva River, Moscow Canal, Vodootvodny Canal within the MKAD beltway limits and the bridges over Yauza River downstream from Rostokino.

== Listing conventions ==
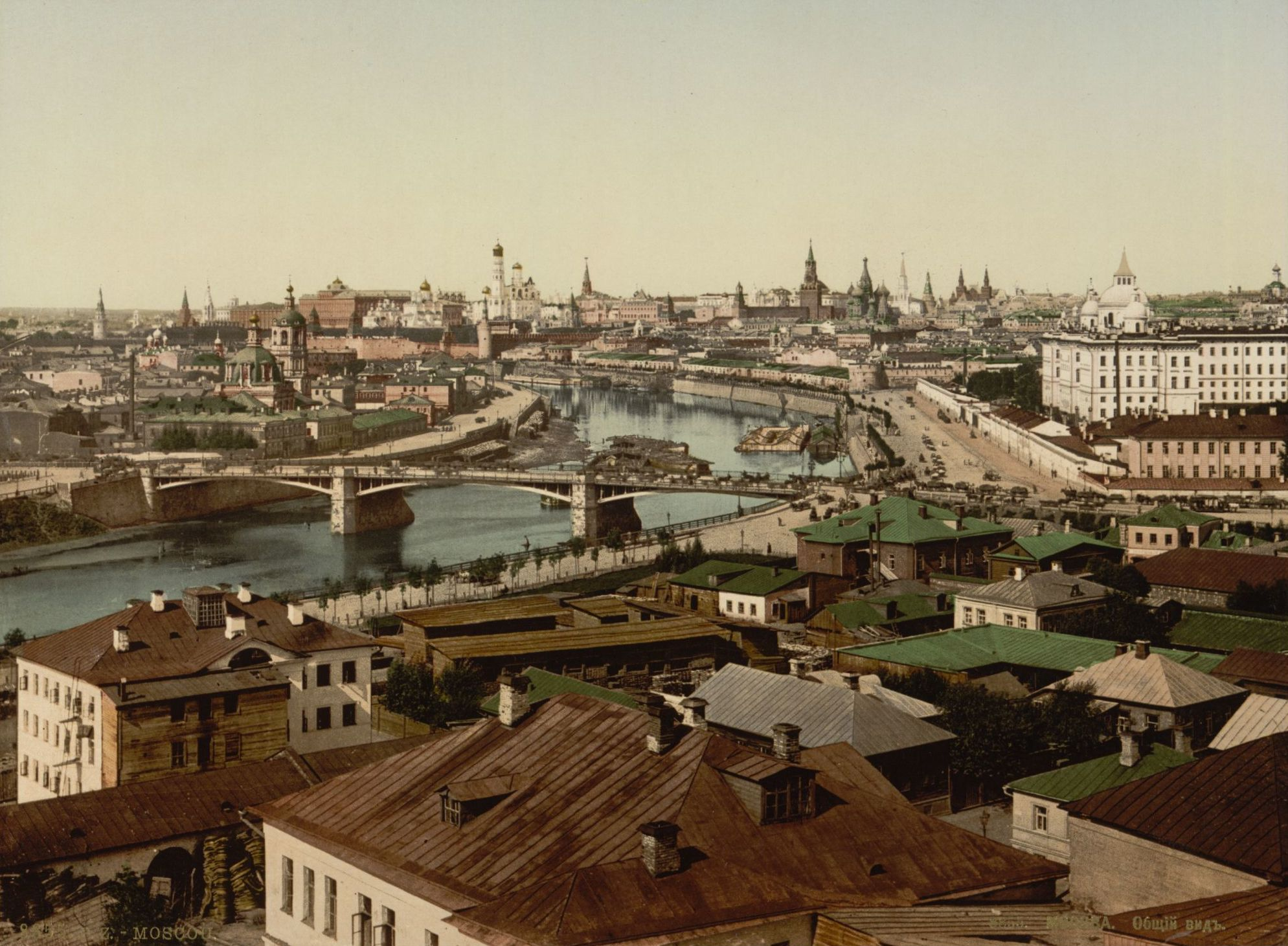
An 1880s postcard of the first, demolished Bolshoy Ustinsky Bridge (1881, existing bridge built in 1938)

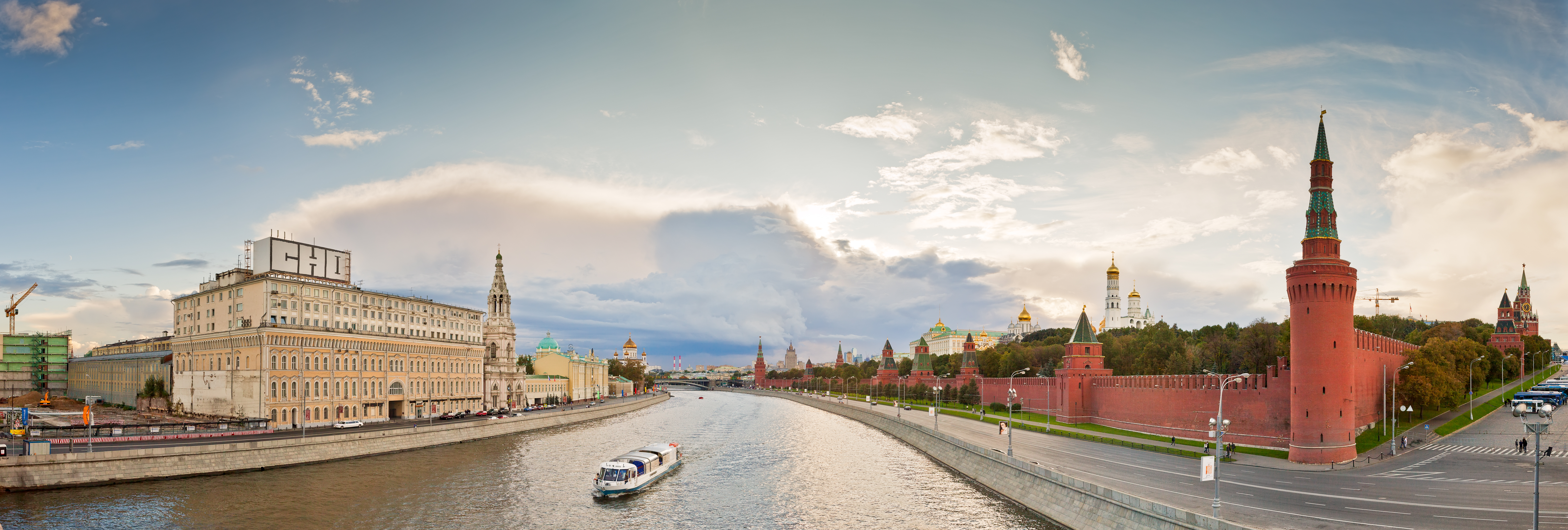
Panoramic view from Bolshoy Moskvoretsky Bridge with the Kremlin to the right, 2011 (Photo: Anton Zelenov)

Bridge lists for each river are sorted in downstream order, with type and year of completion of existing bridge. Pairs of adjacent bridges serving the same highway or rail line are listed as single entries, with different completion years separated by commas. Demolished bridges are listed only when no replacements were built on old sites or nearby. Tram service is shown as of December 2006. Many other existing bridges had tram tracks in the past.

Completion years are referenced to (Yauza river). Reconstruction years are included, when load-bearing arches, girders and roadway decks were replaced. In these cases, both year of original completion and year or years of reconstruction are given, i.e. Novospassky Bridge, 1911/1938/2000. Replacement or relocation of arches, roadway deck and supporting pillars or foundations qualifies as new construction, as in the case of Pushkinsky Pedestrian Bridge (2000). In case of Komissariatsky Bridge, completion (1927) and opening to regular traffic (1960) are separated by decades; only the earliest year (1927) is listed.

== Bridges over Moskva River and Moskva Canal ==
- Khimkinsky Bridges (Химкинские мосты) over Moskva Canal, road:MKAD, 1997 and 1998
- Leningradsky Bridge (Ленинградский мост) over Moskva Canal, road, 1970
- Spassky Bridges (Спасские мосты), road:MKAD, 1998 and 1962) not to be confused with downtown Novospassky Bridge
- Stroginsky Bridge (Строгинский мост), road, tram, 1982
- Moscow-Riga Railroad Bridge over Moskva Canal, rail, 1936
- Zhivopisny Bridge (Живописный мост), road, 2007
- Khoroshevsky Bridge (Хорошёвский мост) over Moskva River Shortcut, road, 1938
- Karamyshevsky Bridge (Карамышевский мост) over Moskva River Shortcut, road, 1937
- Krylatsky Bridge (Крылатский мост), road, 1984
- Kraspopresnensky Bridge (Краснопресненский мост), road, 1965
- Filevsky Rail Bridge (Филевский железнодорожный мост), rail, 1875/1938/1961
- Dorogomilovsky Rail Bridge (Дорогомиловский железнодорожный мост), rail, 1907
- Dorogomilovsky Road Bridge (Дорогомиловский автодорожный мост), road:Third Ring, 2000
- Bagration Bridge (Мост Багратион), pedestrian, 1997
- Novoarbatsky Bridge (Новоарбатский мост), road, 1957
- Smolensky Metro Bridge (Смоленский метромост), subway, 1937
- Borodinsky Bridge (Бородинский мост), road, 1912/1952/2001
- Bogdan Khmelnitsky (Kievsky) Bridge (Мост Богдана Хмельницкого), foot, 2001
- Krasnoluzhsky Rail Bridge (Краснолужский железнодорожный мост), rail, 1907/2001
- Krasnoluzhsky Road Bridge (Краснолужский автодорожный мост), road:Third Ring, 1998
- Luzhniki Metro Bridge (Лужнецкий метромост), road, subway station, 1958/2001
- Andreyevsky Road Bridge (Андреевский автодорожный мост), road:Third Ring, 2000
- Andreyevsky Rail Bridge (Андреевский железнодожный мост), rail, 2001
- Pushkinsky Bridge (Пушкинский мост), foot, 2000
- Krymsky (Crimean) Bridge (Крымский мост), road:Garden Ring, 1938
- Demolished and not replaced: Babyegorodskaya Dam (Бабьегородская плотина), 1836
- Patriarshy Bridge (Патриарший мост), foot, 2004
- Bolshoy Kamenny Bridge (Большой Каменный мост), road, 1938
- Bolshoy Moskvoretsky Bridge (Большой Москворецкий мост), road, 1937
- Bolshoy Ustinsky Bridge (Большой Устьинский мост), road, tram, 1938
- Bolshoy Krasnokholmsky Bridge (Большой Краснохолмский мост), road:Garden Ring, 1938
- Novospassky Bridge (Новоспасский мост), road, tram, 1911/1938/2000
- Demolished and not replaced: wooden Vsesvyatsky road bridge (road, located between Simonov Monastery and Zhukov Proezd)
- Avtozavodsky Bridge (Автозаводский мост), road:Third Ring, 1961. Replaced wooden Danilovsky Bridge (road, tram) that was built after World War I
- Danilovsky Rail Bridge (Alekseevsky) (Даниловский (Алексеевский) железнодорожный мост), rail, 1908/1999
- Demolished and replaced with reclaimed land: wooden Nagatinsky bridge (near present-day portal of Avtozavodskaya tunnel)
- Nagatinsky Metro Bridge (Нагатинский метромост), road, subway, 1969
- Saburovsky Rail Bridges (Сабуровские мосты), rail, 1953 and 1924
- Brateevsky Bridge (Братеевский мост), road, 1989
- Besedinsky Bridges (Бесединские мосты), road:MKAD, 1998 and 1961/1998

== Bridges over Vodootvodny Canal ==
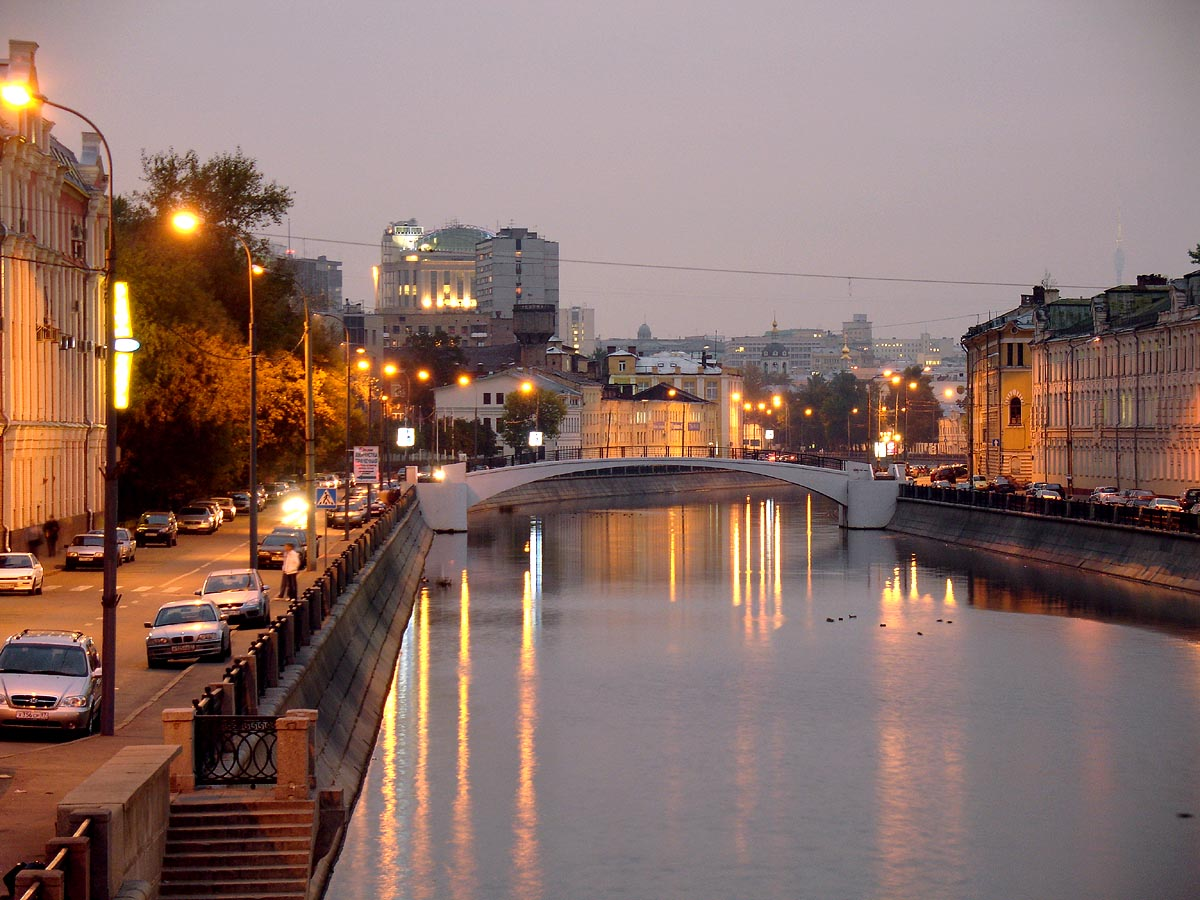
Vodootvodny Canal, Zverev Bridge at dusk (2006), from Maly Krasnokholmsky Bridge. Ostankino Tower visible above rooftops (right)

- Maly Kamenny Bridge (Малый Каменный мост), road, 1938
- Luzhkov Bridge (Лужков мост), foot, 1994
- Maly Moskvoretsky Bridge (Малый Москворецкий мост), road, 1938
- Chugunny Bridge (Чугунный мост), road, 1889/1966
- Sadovnichesky Bridge (Садовнический мост), foot, 1963
- Komissariatsky Bridge (Комиссариатский мост), road, tram, 1927
- Zverev Bridge (Зверев мост), foot, 1930
- Maly Krasnokholmsky Bridge (Малый Краснохолмский мост), road:Garden Ring, 1938
- Second Schluzovoy Bridge (Второй Шлюзовой мост) official title to be confirmed, foot, 1997
- Schluzovoy Bridge (Шлюзовой мост, Sluice bridge), road, 1965

== Bridges over Yauza from Rostokino to Moskva River ==
- Rostokinsky Bridges 1 and 2 (1ый и 2ой Ростокинские мосты), tram, road, 1957
- Milliony Bridge (Миллионный мост) - see Rostokino Aqueduct
- Yaroslavsky Rail Bridge (мост Ярославского направления), rail
- Bogatyrsky Bridge (Богатырский мост), road, tram, 1912
- Oleny Bridge (Олений мост), road
- Glebovsky Bridge (Глебовский мост), road, 1981
- Preobrazhensky Metro Bridge (Преображенский метромост), subway, 1965
- Matrossky Bridge (Матросский мост), road, tram, 1956
- Rubtsovsko-Dvortsovy Bridge (Рубцовско-Дворцовый мост), foot
- Elektrozavodsky Bridges (Электрозаводские мосты), road, rail, foot
- Rubtsov Bridge (Рубцов мост), foot
- Gospitalny Bridge (Госпитальный мост), road, 1941
- Lefortovsky Bridge (Лефортовский мост), road, tram, 1777/1940
- Third Ring Bridge (Мост ТТК через Яузу), road:Third Ring, 2000
- Saltykovsky Bridge (Салтыковский мост), foot
- Tamozhenny Bridge (Таможенный мост), foot
- Andronikov Bridge (Андроников мост), rail
- Kostomarovsky Bridge (Костомаровский мост), road, 1941
- Vysokoyauzsky Bridge (Высокояузский мост), road:Garden Ring, 1890/1963
- Tessinsky Bridge (Тессинский мост), foot
- Astakhovsky (Yauzsky) Bridge (Астаховский (Яузский) мост), road, 1938
- Maly Ustinsky Bridge (Малый Устьинский мост), road, 1938

== Other notable bridges, dams, locks and aqueducts ==
- Gorbaty Bridge over Presnya (Горбатый мост), memorial, 1806/1986
- Rostokino Aqueduct over Yauza (Ростокинский акведук), 1780–1804
- Setunski Bridge over Setun (Сетуньский мост), road, 1953
- Tushino Canal Tunnel (canal, road, tram, 1937)
- Pererva Dam (Перервинская плотина), 1932–1937
- Karamyshevskaya Dam (Карамышевская плотина), 1932–1937
- Yauza Locks
