= Novoarbatsky Bridge =

Suspension bridge in Moscow, Russia

Novoarbatsky Bridge Новоарбатский мост
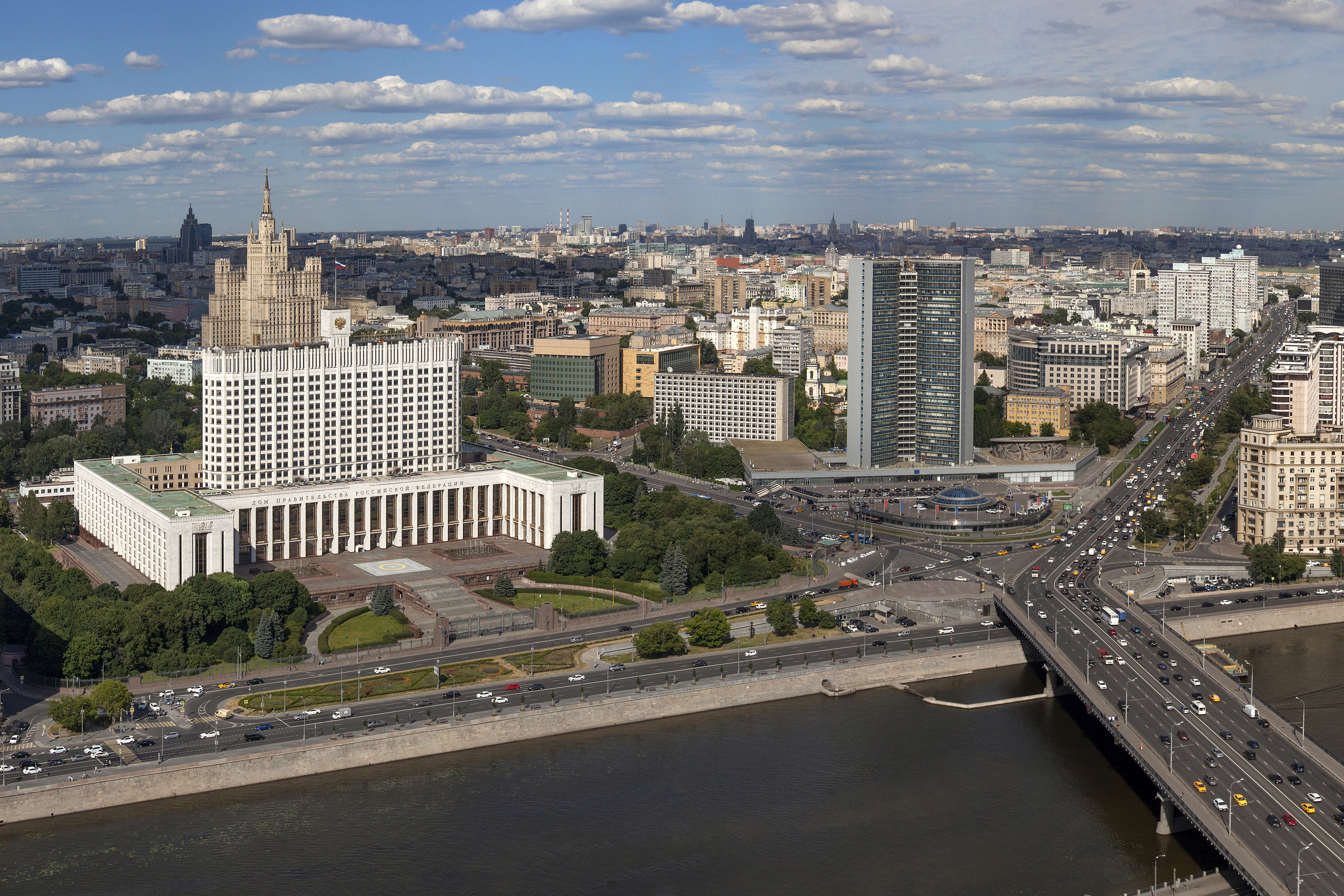
- Coordinates: 55°45′07″N 37°34′20″E
- Crosses: Moskva
- Locale: Moscow, Russia

Characteristics
- Material: Steel
- Total length: 502 m (1,647 ft)
- Width: 43 m (141 ft)
- Longest span: 108 m (354 ft)

History
- Construction start: 1954
- Opened: 1957; 69 years ago

Location
- Interactive map of Novoarbatsky Bridge

Novoarbatsky Bridge (Russian: Новоарбатский мост) is a road bridge that crosses the Moskva river in Moscow. It is located between the Western (Kutuzovsky Prospekt) and Central Administrative Okrugs (Novy Arbat). It is one of the first bridges in Russia with an all-welded steel-reinforced concrete span and a roadway slab pressed with high-strength reinforcement.

== See also ==
- List of bridges in Moscow
