= Borodinsky Bridge =

Coordinates: 55°44′43″N 37°34′24″E

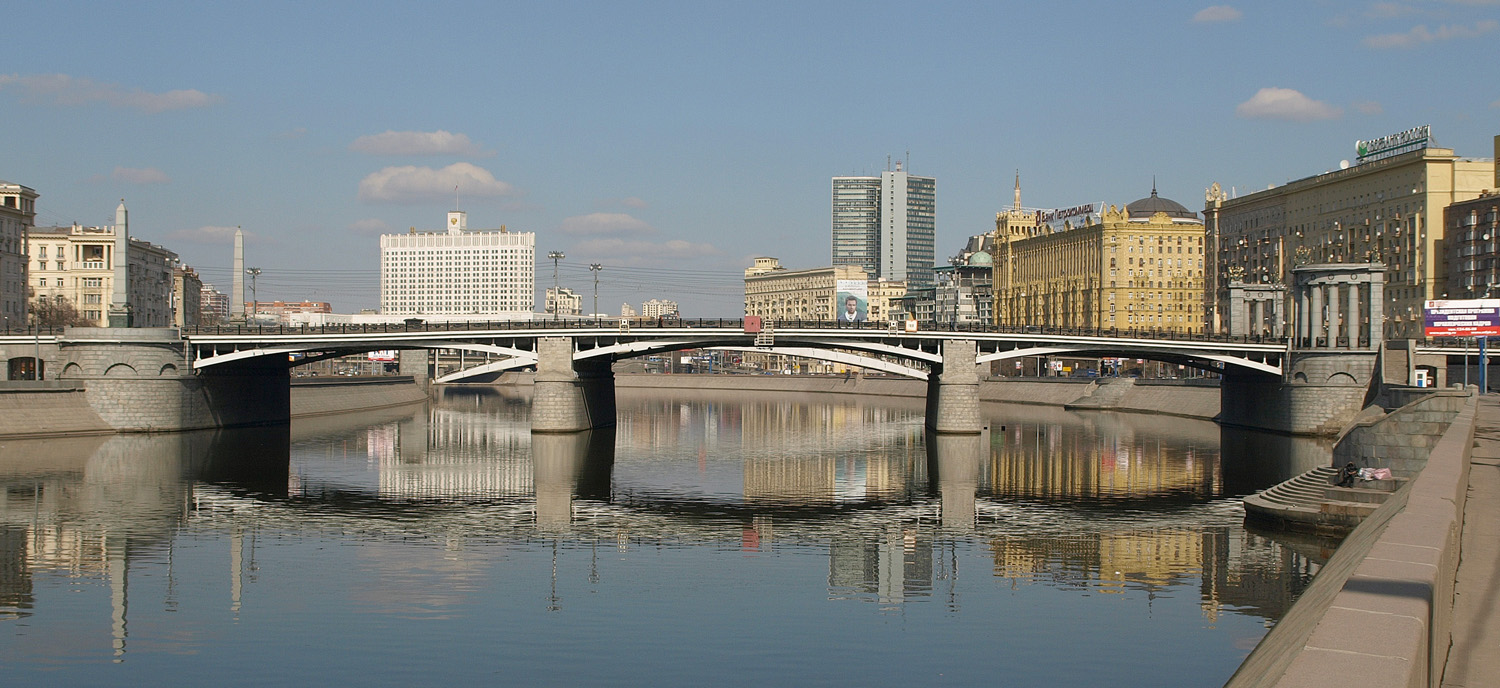
Borodinsky bridge, view north, Smolensky Metro Bridge and White House of Russia behind it.

Borodinsky Bridge (Russian: Бороди́нский мост) is a steel plate girder bridge that spans Moskva River, connecting Dorogomilovo District and Kievsky Rail Terminal with the centre of Moscow, Russia (two kilometers due west from the Kremlin). The bridge was built in 1911–1912 as deck arch bridge by N.I. Oskolkov, M.I. Schekotov (structural engineering) and Roman Klein (architectural design). In 2001, the bridge was reconstructed, replacing arches and deck with a plate girder structure.

== Dorogomilovo Live Bridge (1788, demolished) ==
Site of Borodinsky Bridge was Moscow's westward river crossing since Middle Ages. The first documented live (pontoon) wooden bridge was built here in 1788. During the 1812 war with France the bridge was in the way of retreating Russians and Napoleon's troops invading Moscow.

== Borodinsky Bridge (1868, demolished 1911) ==
The city decided to build a permanent bridge on this site in 1865, authorizing 300,000 rouble total expenditure. The first bidding contest brought no winner, the job was later awarded to Amand Struwe. His draft was approved by Alexander II, who christened the bridge Borodinsky to commemorate the Battle of Borodino. Construction started May 2, 1867 and commissioned March 15, 1868. Typical for Struwe, it was a steel truss box, with three 43 meter long spans. Trusses were built by Kolomna Works (owned by Struwe family) and ferried by river.

== Borodinsky Bridge (1912, existing) ==
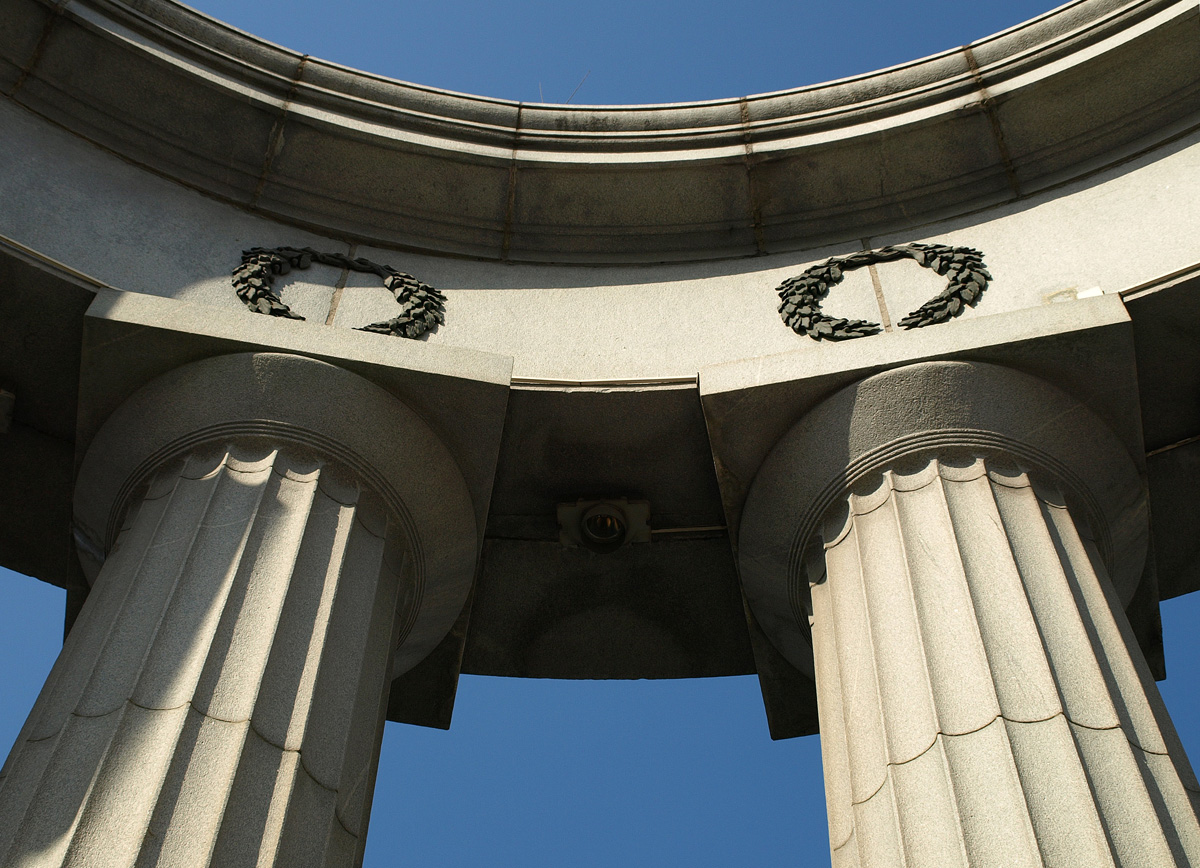
Roman portico on the western side of the bridge

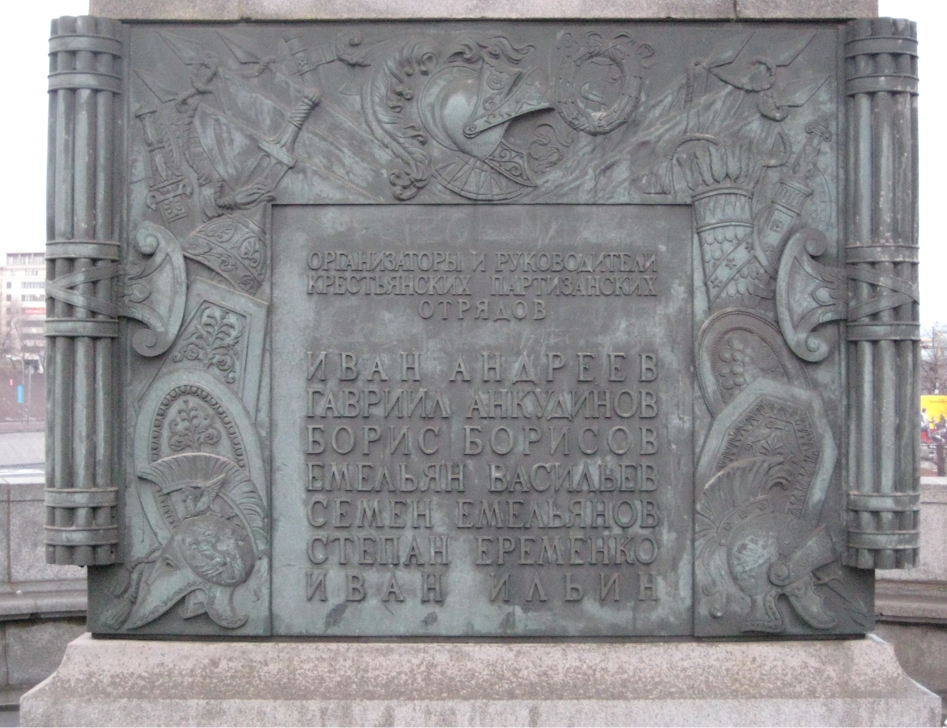
Obelisks on the eastern side with names of war heroes

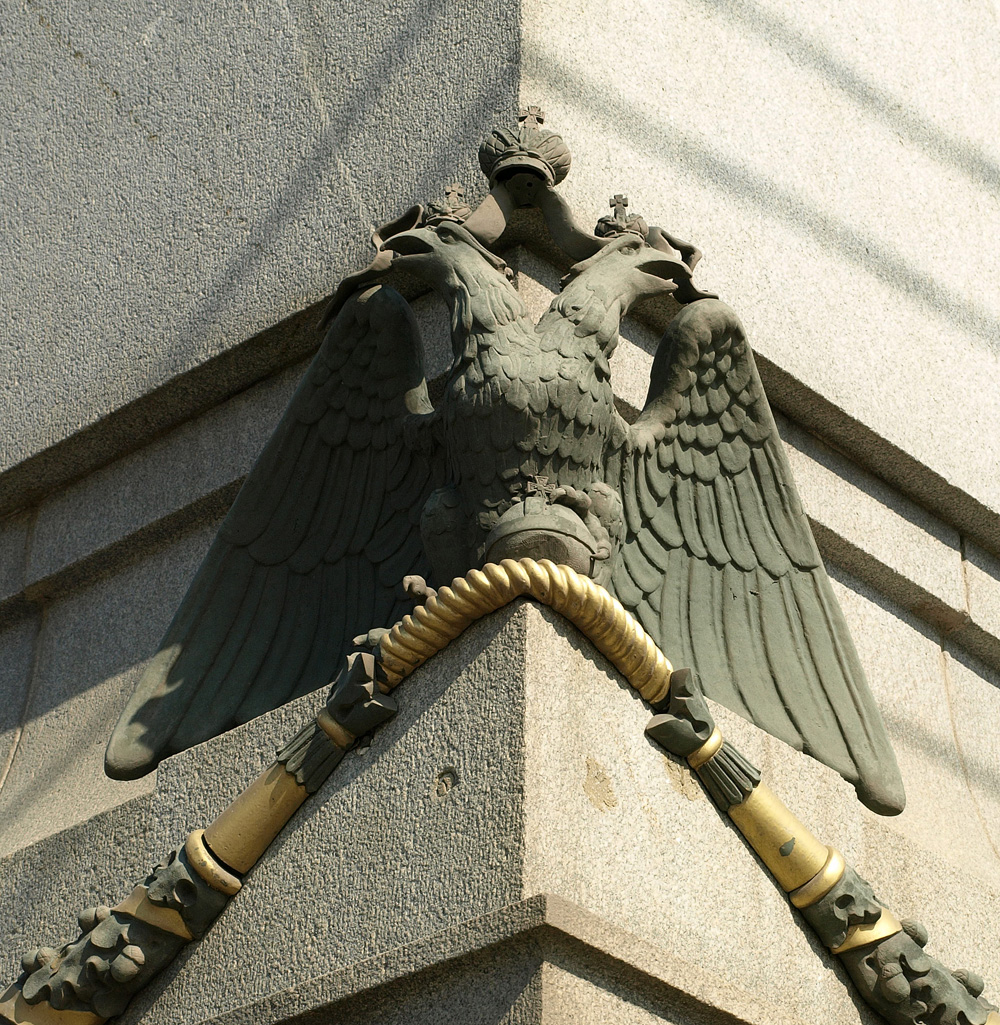
Imperial coat of arms

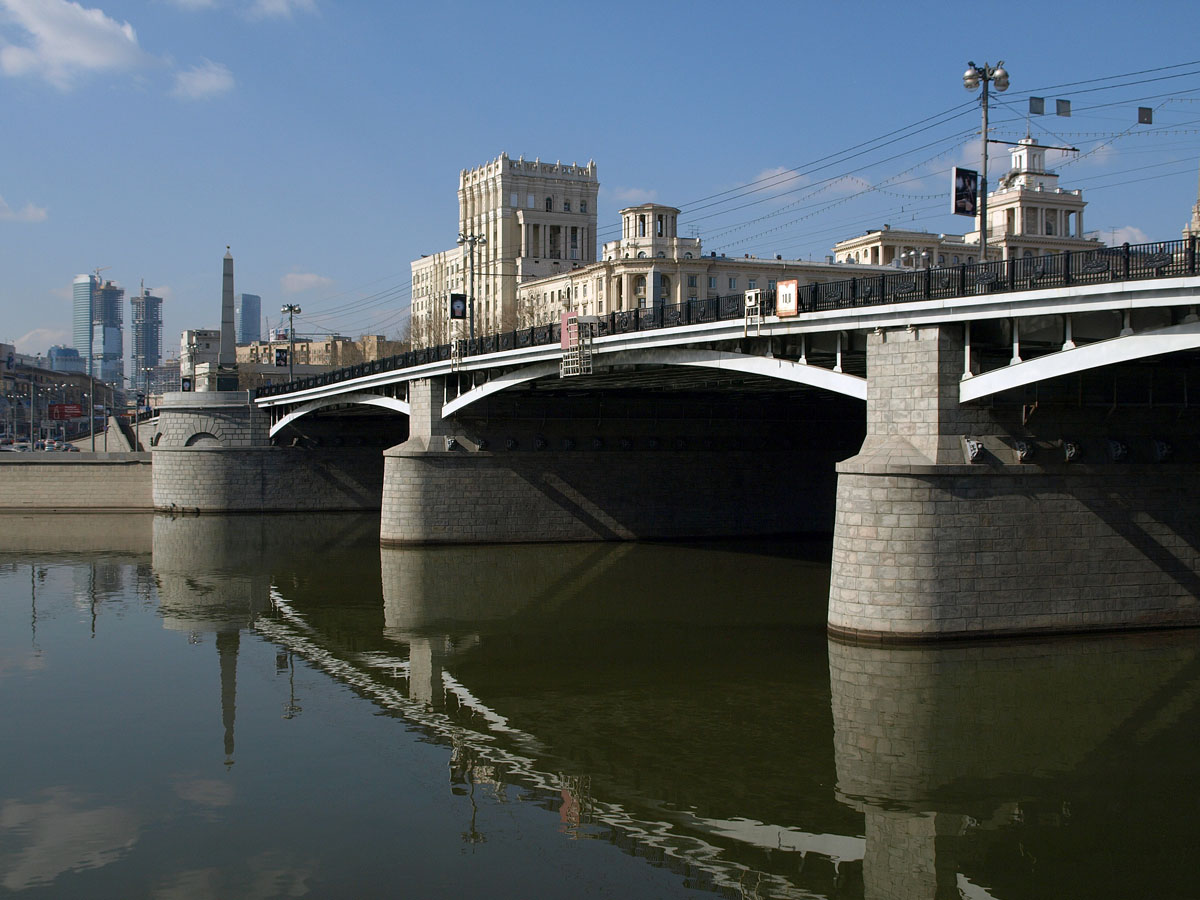
Present-day arches are a mere decoration

First Borodinsky Bridge had too low capacity to handle traffic to Kievsky Rail Terminal. In 1909 the city ran a public contest for the new bridge. Oskolkov, Schekotov and Klein won the contest and began construction in 1911.

The bridge, as built in 1912, was 250 meters long, with three spans of 40.9 - 45.5 - 40.9 meters. Each span consisted of 12 arches (spacing between arched 2.1 meters). Concrete deck had an 18.5 meter wide roadway and two pedestrian walkways, each 3.5 meters wide.

== Reconstruction of 1952 ==
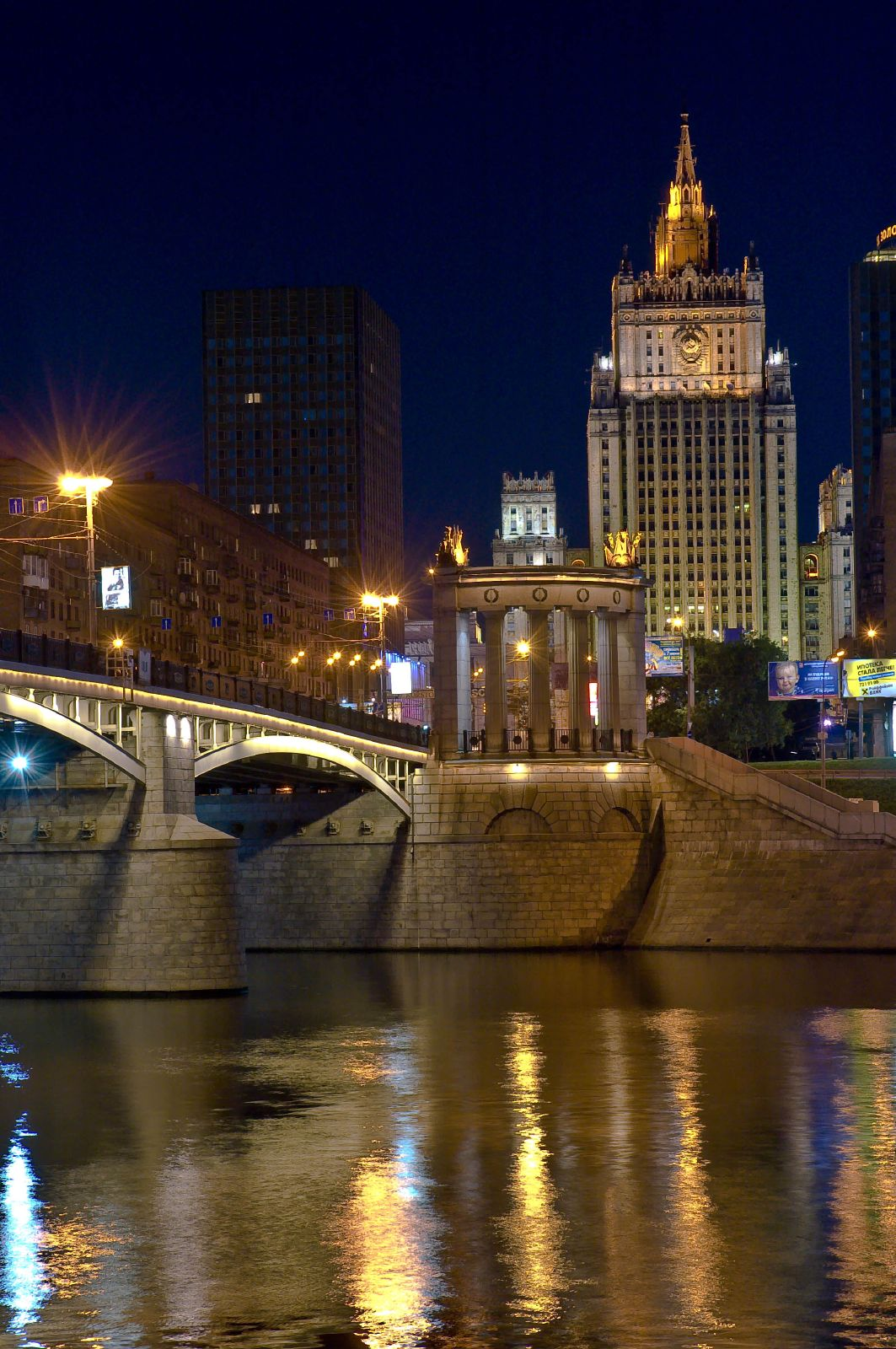
Borodinskiy Bridge at night

In 1952, it was rebuilt by Yury Werner. The pillars, arches and deck were extended, widening the bridge to 42.6 meters total width. New arches above embankments (26.0 meter main spans) separated bridge and embankment traffic. Total length reached 352 meters (including western ramp of 106 meters). Tram tracks were removed in 1979.

== Reconstruction of 2001 ==
In 1999, the city decided to rebuild the ageing bridge again. Examination of structure dictated complete replacement of arches and deck. At the same time, pillars appeared to be too weak to carry replacement steel arches or a concrete girder box. The only remaining option, a steel plate girder set with an orthotropic deck, was light enough and was completed in 2001. The bridge retained original stone obelisks and porticos dedicated to the war of 1812.

As in the case of Novospassky Bridge, rebuilt Borodinsky Bridge was dressed up with fake skirts to look like an arched bridge. These skirts are larger than Novospassky's and actually look like arches.

== See also ==
- List of bridges in Moscow
