= Zverev Bridge =

Footbridge in Moscow, Russia

Coordinates: 55°44′12″N 37°38′23″E

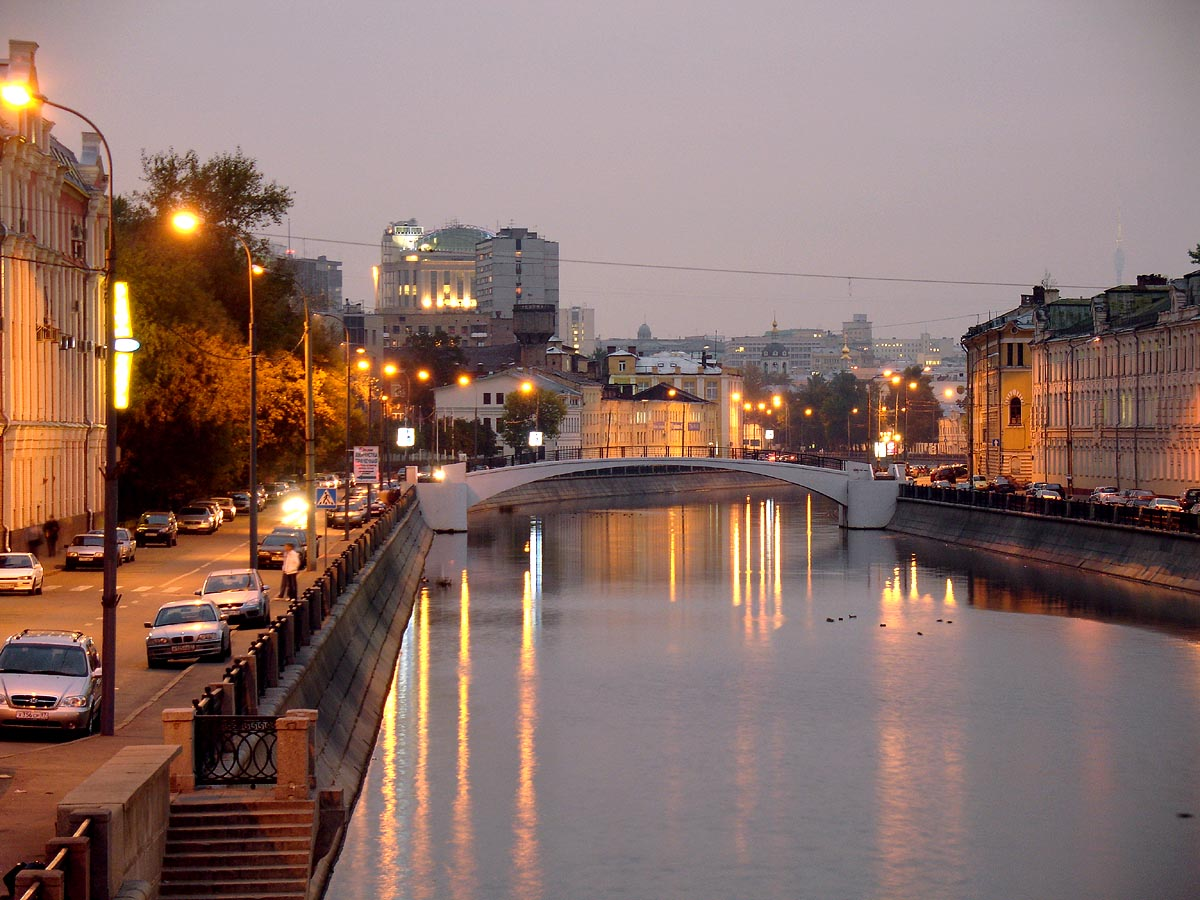
Vodootvodny Canal and Zverev Bridge at dusk (2006), from Maly Krasnokholmsky Bridge. Ostankino Tower is visible above rooftops.

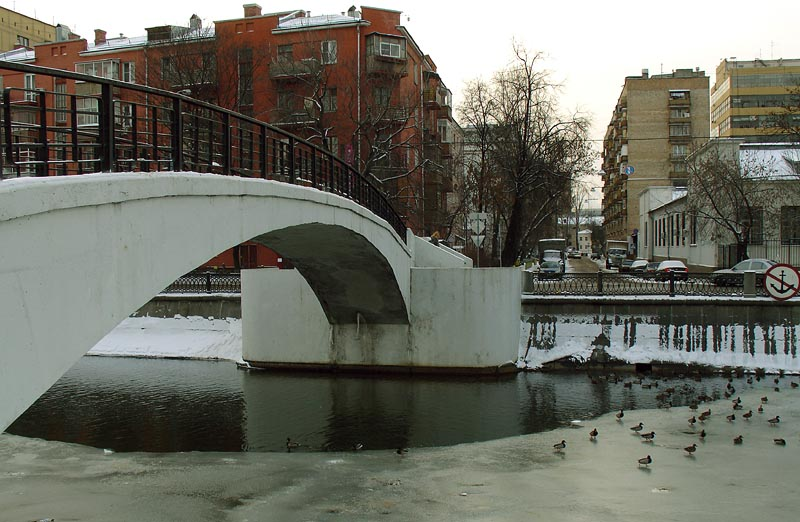
Zverev Bridge. Ducks enjoy a warm spot (temperature is -9C)

Zverev Bridge (Russian: Зверев мост) is a pedestrian arch bridge that spans Vodootvodny Canal in Zamoskvorechye district of downtown Moscow, Russia. It was built in 1930 by N.Ya.Kalmykov (structural engineering) and I.A.Frantsuz (architectural design).

== History and specifications ==
The oldest pedestrian bridge in Moscow, it connects Sadovnichesky (formerly Zverev) lane with Bolshoy Tatarsky Lane. The name Zverev belonged to a local merchant family; in soviet time, it was deemed improper for a lane, but quite acceptable for a small bridge in a working-class neighborhood. Today, both sides of Vodootvodny Canal are a mix of expensive residential and office space, but in 1930 the Canal was flanked by industrial properties - textile mills in Sadovniki and Red Hills, boiler and turbine plants on the other bank.

Main arch was made of in situ concrete, covered with jute mats for moisture protection and paved with ordinary asphalt. The unusually slim arch, traditionally painted white, is 32.675 meters long and 3.0 meters wide. In the middle, it is only 40 centimeters thick (55 centimeters including asphalt layer). Total length, including shoreside stairs, is 42.675 meters.

Shallow but warm water in the Canal around this bridge attracts scores of mallard ducks in winter; in summer, it is abundant with small fish and yellow water lilies.

== Film location ==
Zverev Bridge can be seen in the 1997 film The Saint at the time point of 01:06:20.

== See also ==
- List of bridges in Moscow
