= Moscow-Riga Railroad Bridge =

Coordinates: 55°48′50″N 37°26′56″E

Moscow-Riga Railroad Bridge is a concrete arch bridge that spans the Moscow Canal between Tushino and Shchukino Districts in northwestern Moscow, Russia. The bridge does not have an official name and is sometimes called the Railroad bridge over Moscow Canal. It was completed in 1936, designed by A.S.Bachelis.

== History and specifications ==
Construction of Moscow Canal (1932-1938) required building a new railroad bridge on a track running over the lower chamber of Lock No.8., near the village of Shchukino, which at this time was far outside the city limits. Tram service to Shchukino was started soon afterwards in 1938, but urban development didn't began until the 1960s.

The bridge is 200.8 metres (659 ft) long and 20.0 metres (65.6 ft) high. The main span is 120 m (390 ft) long and 17.5 m (57 ft) high, consisting of a simple Mayard box profile with a 4.1 m (13 ft) span between side walls, equidistant between track centres. The upper and lower walls of the box are 9.5 and 8.06 m (31 ft 2 in and 26 ft 5 in) wide. Inside, the arch box has diaphragm braces (30 cm (12 in) thick on 4.1 m (13 ft) spacing, with corresponding vertical beams on the outer walls. Each arch stands on concrete foundations 34.3 by 19.2 m (113 by 63 ft), supported by 992 wooden piles. The upper deck rests on concrete girders (one for each track), 3.5 m (11 ft) high; their width varies from 50 to 70 cm (20 to 28 in).

This bold bridge has become an icon of pre-World War II soviet propaganda, including on a postage stamp (January 1941) and in movie appearances. According to the most recent studies (1990), the bridge is structurally safe and sound, although its unpainted concrete may look rusty upon close inspection.

== Gallery ==
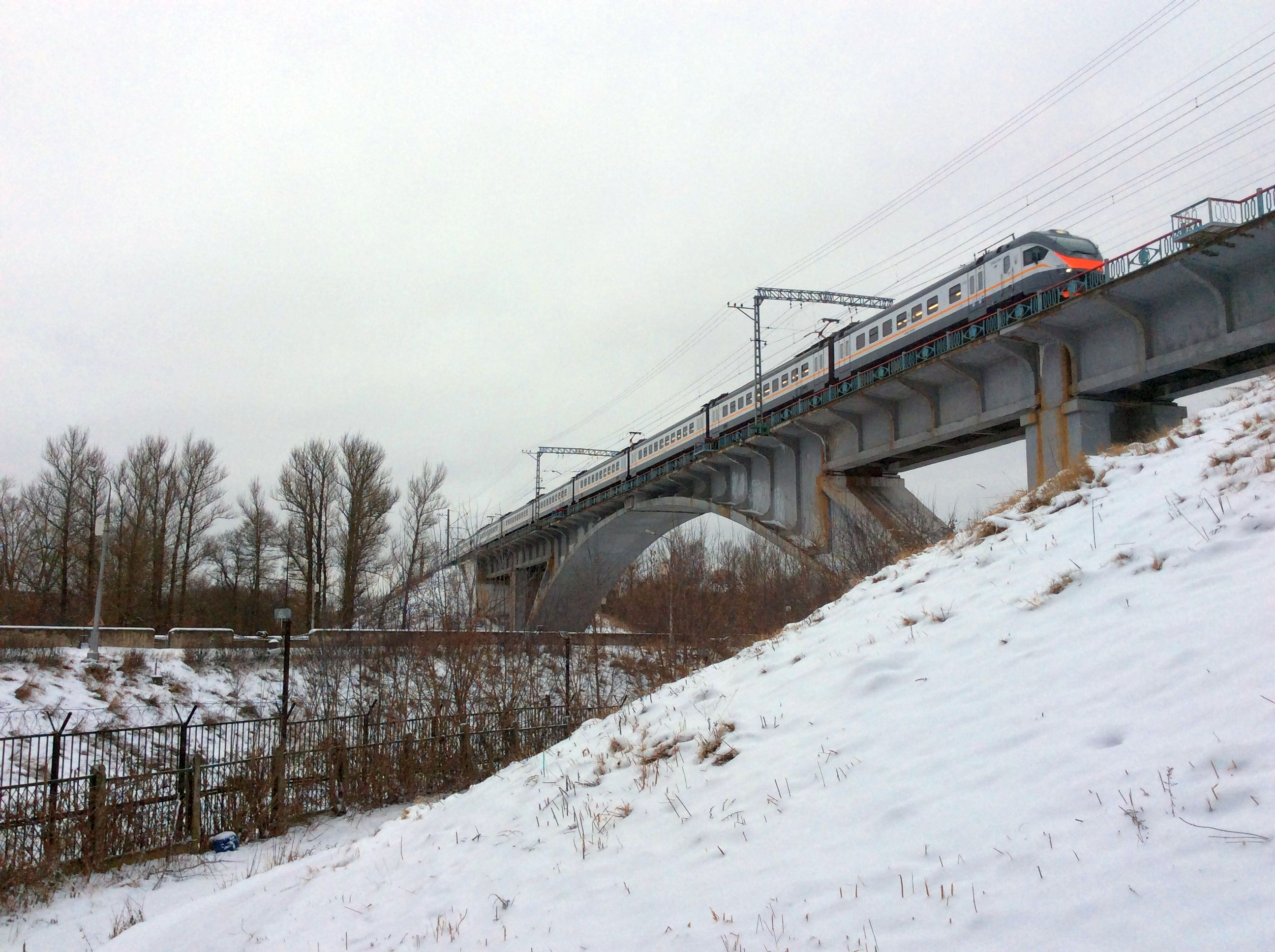

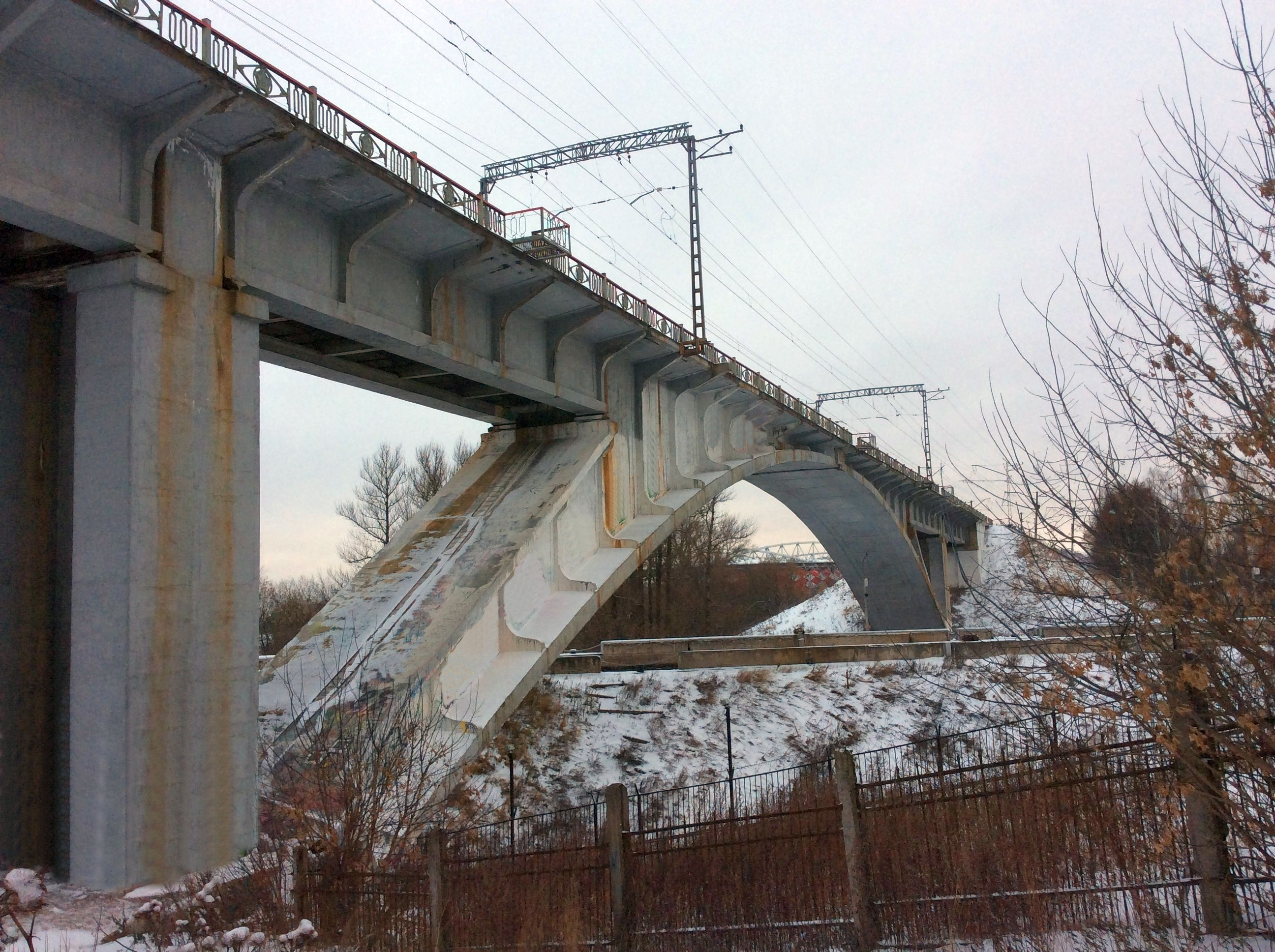

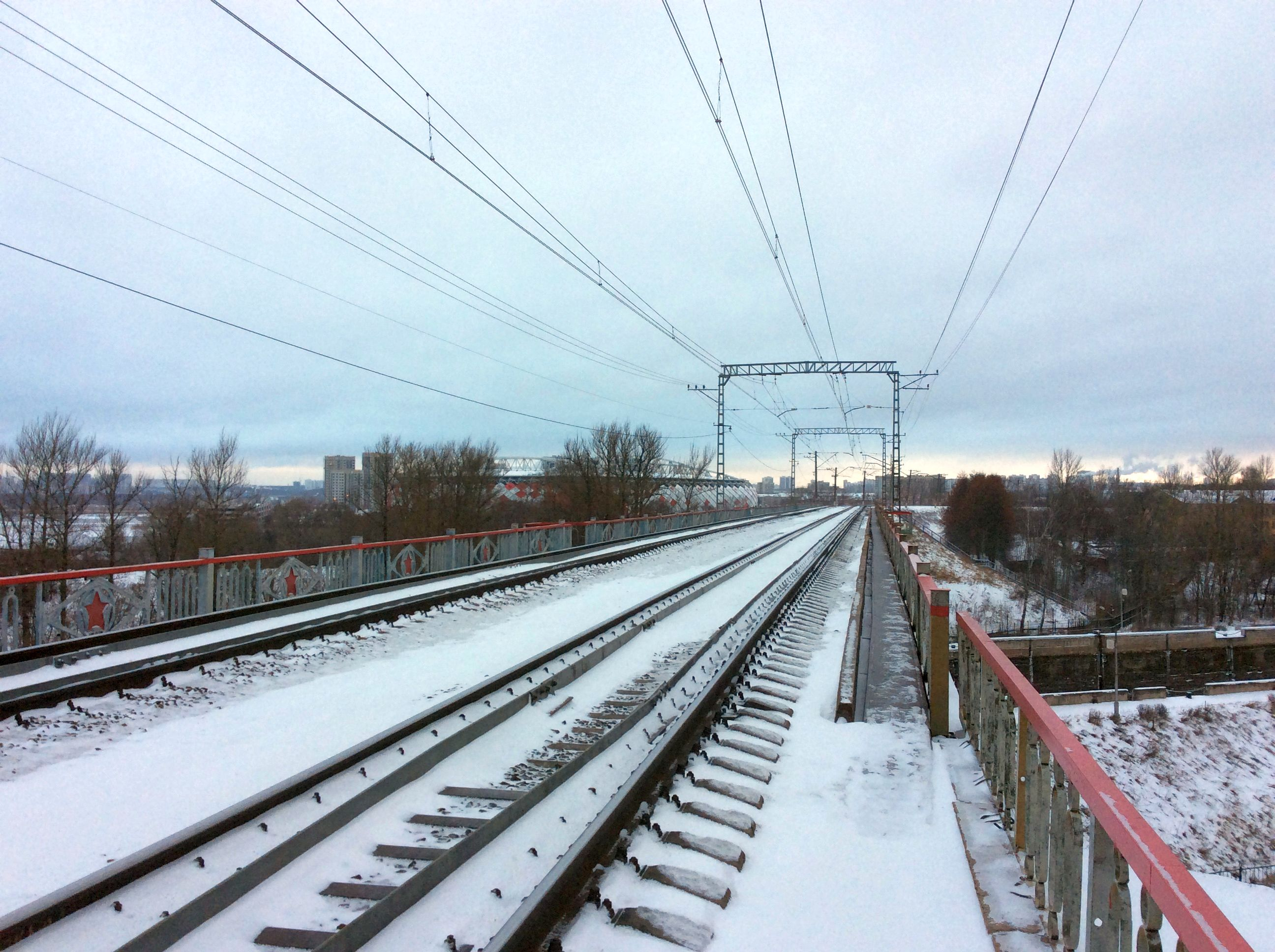

== See also ==
- List of bridges in Moscow
