= Saburovsky Rail Bridges =

Bridge in Moscow, Russia

Coordinates: 55°38′37″N 37°41′34″E

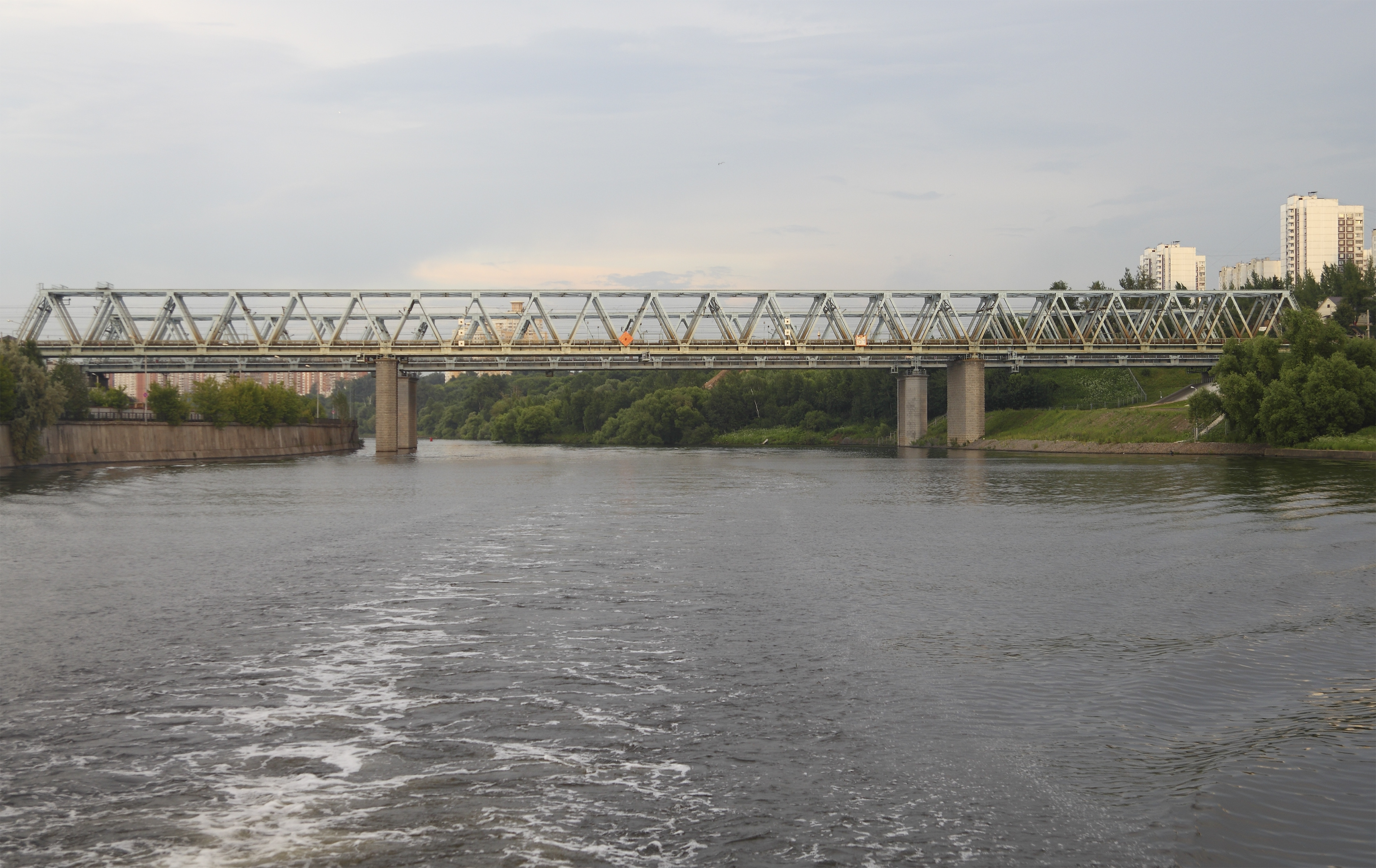
Second bridge

Saburovsky Rail Bridges (Russian: Cабуровские железнодорожные мосты) are two adjacent steel bridges that span Moskva River in southern Moskvorechye-Saburovo District of Moscow, Russia. They were completed in 1924 and 1953, when Saburovo was a remote suburb of Moscow.

== Saburovsky Bridge (1924) ==
The first bridge on this site was completed in 1924 as a four-span deck-arch bridge, designed by Lavr Proskuryakov. Spans are 42.0+53.4+53.4+42.0 meters long, total length 217 meters.

== Abandoned Saburovsky Bridge ==
In 1936, a second, four-track bridge was laid nearby; in 1941, when the pillars were complete, work was interrupted by the war. Post-war examination revealed potential safety problems with these pillars, site was abandoned and a new bridge was laid in 1951. The pillars still stand between two existing bridges.

== Saburovsky Bridge (1953) ==
The second existing bridge, completed in 1953, is a high through-arch bridge with a 151.3 meter long main arch which stands 31.5 meters above water level. It is the highest steel arch in Moscow (until the upcoming completion of Zhivopisny Bridge).

== See also ==
- List of bridges in Moscow
