= Maly Krasnokholmsky Bridge =

Coordinates: 55°44′01″N 37°38′31″E

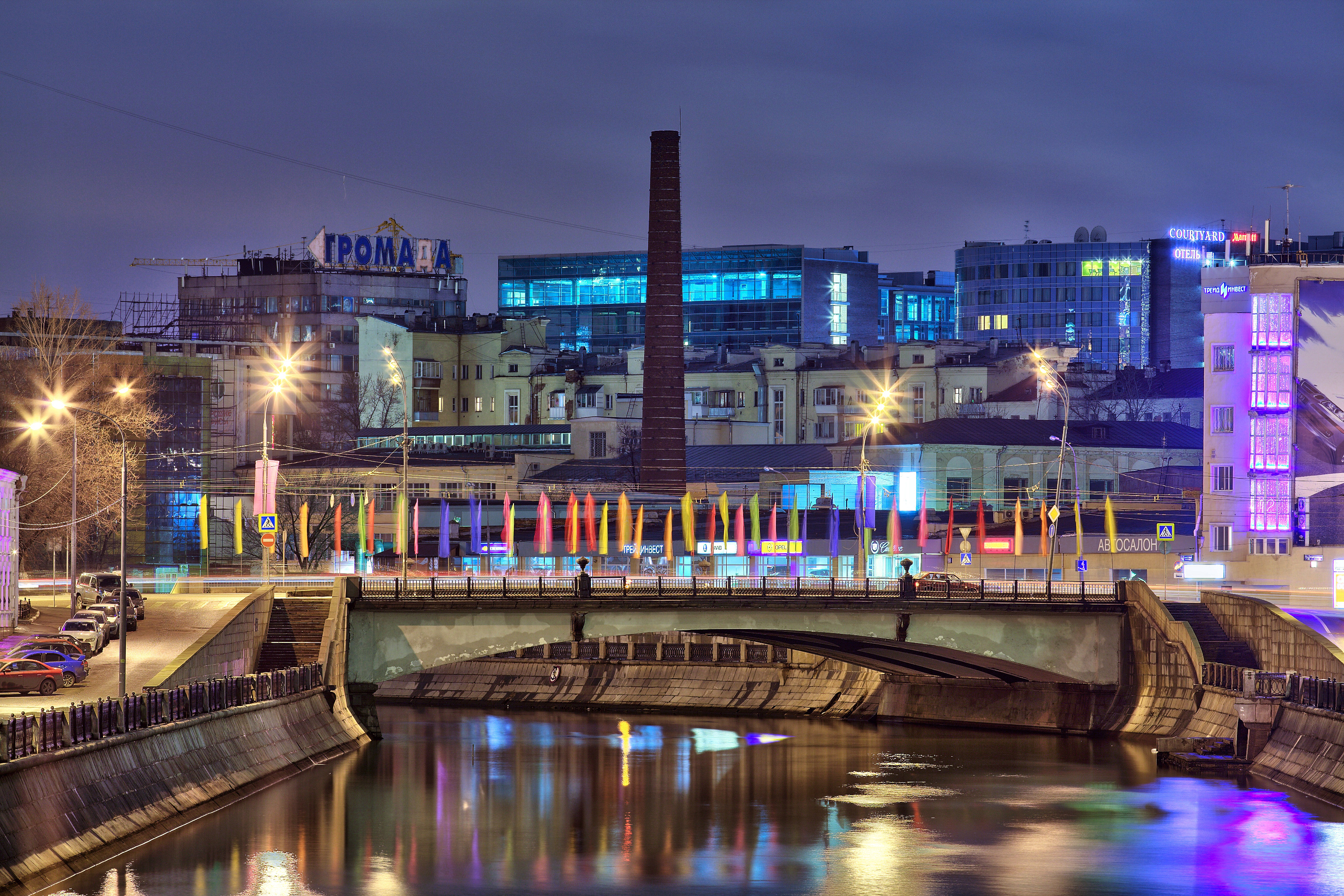
Night view of Maly Krasnokholmsky Bridge from Zverev Bridge

Maly Krasnokholmsky Bridge (Russian: Малый Краснохолмский мост) is a bridge over the Vodootvodny Canal in Zamoskvorechye District in Moscow, Russia. This is one of the three bridges in the Garden Ring, a ring road encircling the city center. The bridge connects Nizhnyaya Krasnokholmskaya Street (located between the canal and the Moskva River) and Zatsepsky Val Street. The length of the bridge is 70 metres (230 ft).

The bridge was constructed in 1938 by V.A.Pashchenko (structural engineering) and Viktor Kokorin (architectural design)., at the same time as Bolshoy Krasnokholmsky Bridge over the Moskva River.

There is public transportation over the bridge. In particular, as everywhere on the Garden Ring, there is passenger trolleybus traffic.
