= Novospassky Bridge =

Coordinates: 55°43′44″N 37°39′14″E

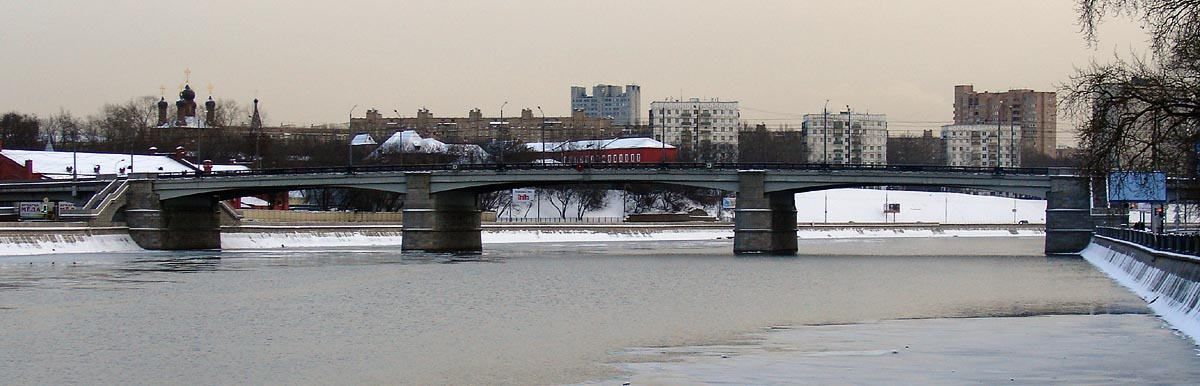
Novospassky Bridge

Novospassky Bridge (Russian: Новоспасский Мост, romanized: Novospasskiy Most) is a steel plate girder bridge that spans Moskva River, connecting Novospassky Monastery and Paveletsky rail terminal areas in Moscow, Russia (about 3 kilometers south-east from the Kremlin). It was built in 1911, as a triple-span steel arch bridge. Reconstruction in 2000 replaced arches with a simpler plate girder structure. Note that the memorial plaque on the bridge spells its name Ново-Спасский, with dash, despite tradition and spelling rules.

== History ==
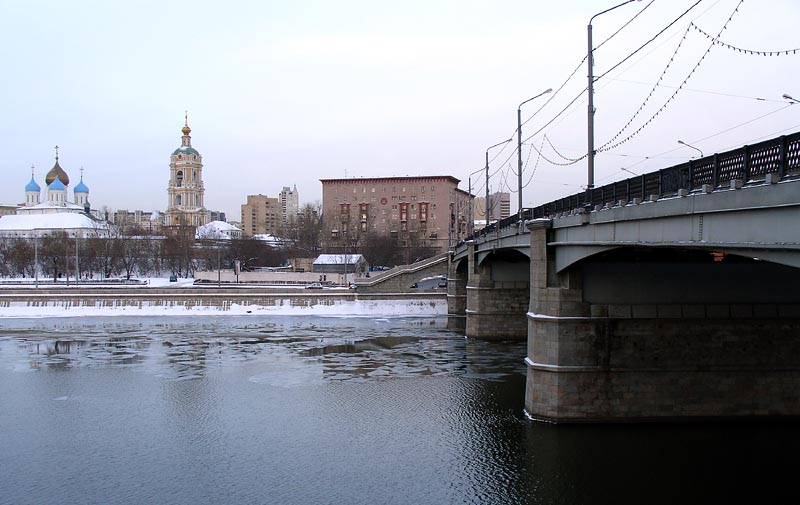
Arches replaced with girders, fake arch-like skirts. Note the traces of 1938 upgrade on pillars

Wooden bridges at the site of fortified Novospassky monastery existed since 16th century. The last wooden causeway was demolished in 1910.

In 1911, the city built a triple-span arched bridge, similar to other pre-revolutionary Moscow bridges. Spans were 40.54, 46.99 and 40.54 meters long, 21.2 meters wide (4 lanes, including two tram lines). Each span was supported by 14 arches, 3.7 meters high for middle span, 3.3 meters high for side spans. Steel deck was paved with 13-centimeter-thick (5.1 in) timbers.

In 1937–1938, the bridge was reconstructed to the design by Yu.F.Werner (structural engineering), N.B.Sokolov and Yakovlev brothers (architectural design). They raised the deck by 2.7 meters, which increased water clearance 8.6 meters high, 30 meters wide (for heavy barge traffic after completion of Moscow Canal). This also enabled separating embankment and bridge traffic in two levels (street-level throughways under main deck), total length with ramps reached 502 meters. Timber pavement was replaced with concrete and asphalt.

== Reconstruction of 2000 ==
In 2000, the bridge was rebuilt with complete replacement of deck structure. Arches were replaced with a simple steel girder set covered with orthotropic deck, 24.4 meters wide. The architects tried to mimic the old outline with arch-like skirts; these look inadequately lightweight and are nowhere near the original. The structure itself is lightweight, excessively vibrating when trams pass by. Build quality is questionable. As soon as 2003, the granite-clad shoreside pillars and ramps were covered with rusty spots showing fast corrosion right under the surface. According to the authors of Bridges of Moscow, reconstruction of Novospassky is the worst of its kind ever done in Moscow.

== See also ==
- List of bridges in Moscow
