= Orthotropic deck =

Welded steel segmented construction technique for bridge decks

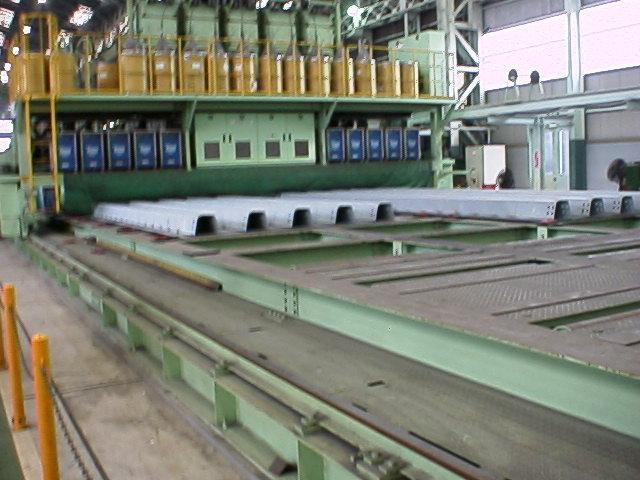
Fabricating an orthotropic deck section

An orthotropic bridge or orthotropic deck is typically one whose fabricated deck consists of a structural steel deck plate stiffened either longitudinally with ribs or transversely, or in both directions. This allows the fabricated deck both to directly bear vehicular loads and to contribute to the bridge structure's overall load-bearing behaviour. The orthotropic deck may be integral with or supported on a grid of deck framing members, such as transverse floor beams and longitudinal girders. All these various choices for the stiffening elements, e.g., ribs, floor beams and main girders, can be interchanged, resulting in a great variety of orthotropic panels.

Decks with different stiffnesses in longitudinal and transverse directions are called 'orthotropic'. If the stiffnesses are similar in the two directions, then the deck is called 'isotropic'.

The steel deck-plate-and-ribs system may be idealized for analytical purposes as an orthogonal-anisotropic plate, hence the abbreviated designation “orthotropic.”

== Discussion ==
The stiffening elements can serve several functions simultaneously. They enhance the bending resistance of the plate to allow it to carry local wheel loads and distribute those loads to main girders. They also increase the total cross-sectional area of steel in the plate, which can increase its contribution to the overall bending capacity of the deck (i.e. the deck plate acts as a top flange in a box or I beam girder). Finally, the stiffeners increase the resistance of the plate to buckling.

The same structural effects are also true of the concrete slab in a composite girder bridge, but the steel orthotropic deck is considerably lighter, and therefore allows longer span bridges to be more efficiently designed.

Resistance to use of an orthotropic deck relates mainly to its cost of fabrication, due to the amount of welding involved. In addition, it must be prefabricated rather than assembled on site, which offers less flexibility than in-situ concrete decks. Orthotropic decks have been prone to fatigue problems and to delamination of the wearing surface, which, like the deck, is also often of a very thin material to reduce weight.

== Invention ==
Underside of wider 2000–2001 orthotropic replacement deck of Lions Gate Bridge

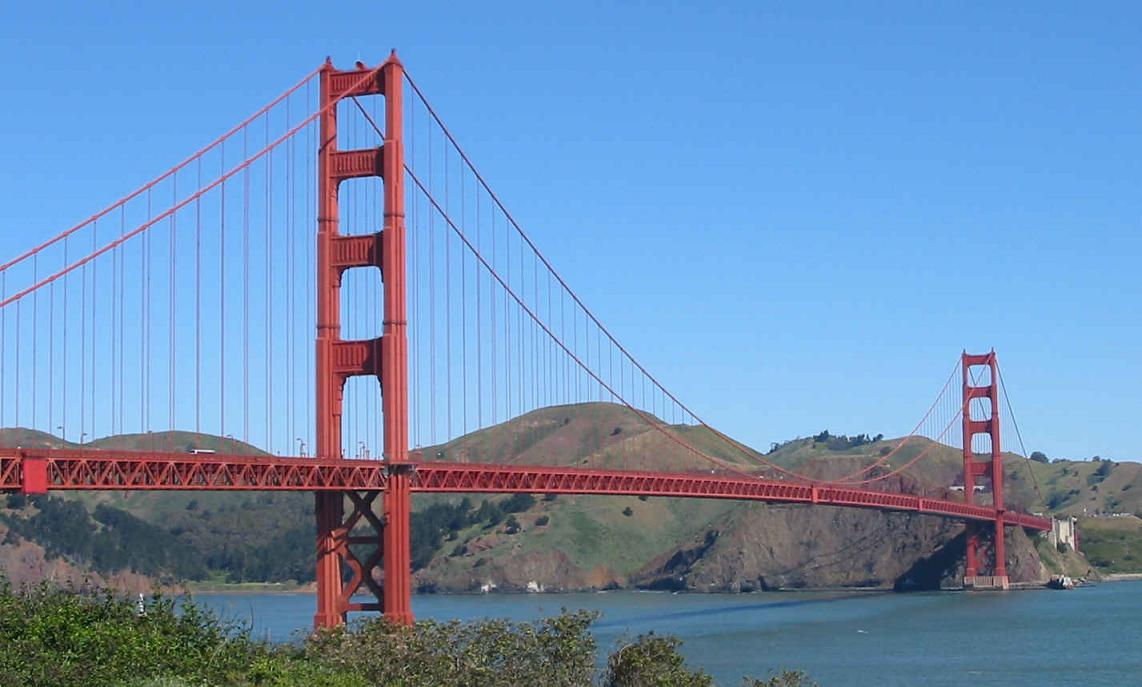
From 1982 to 1986, the Golden Gate Bridge was refitted with an orthotropic deck

The M.A.N. Corporation proposed a suspension bridge with a steel orthotropic deck developed by German engineer Dr. Wilhelm Cornelius in 1948. Cornelius suggested the orthotropic plate theory to determine internal forces and displacements for load-bearing surfaces, which allowed for improvements in longitudinal and transverse parts.

Thousands of orthotropic deck bridges are in existence throughout the world. Despite the savings and advantages (up to 25% of total bridge mass can be saved by reducing deck weight, as the weight reductions extend to cables, towers, piers, anchorages, etc.), the US has only about 60 such bridge decks in use as of late 2005. About 25% of orthotropic in the US are in California, including the San Mateo-Hayward Bridge, which is one of the first major bridges in the US to be built using an orthotropic deck.

Some very large cable-supported bridges, plus current record span (cable-stayed bridges and suspension bridges) would not be feasible without steel orthotropic decks. The longest record span box girder, slant-leg bridges; arch bridges; movable bridges and two Norwegian floating bridges all use orthotropic decks.

The Millau Viaduct, a cable-stayed bridge at Millau, France, has the largest orthotropic steel deck area of any single bridge. The lower total gross weight of the superstructure allowed bridge launching from both ends of the Millau Viaduct.

The Akashi Kaikyō Bridge's orthotropic deck allowed the Japanese to build the longest span at about 6,000 ft (1,800 m), or 50% longer than the Golden Gate Bridge.

Orthotropic decks permit a very shallow deck depth which reduces the steepness of approach gradients and hence their costs. The form is also widely used on bascule and other moveable bridges where significant savings in the cost of the mechanical elements can be made where a lighter deck is used. The El Ferdan Railway Bridge across the Suez Canal of Egypt is the longest swing bridge in the world. The Erasmus Bridge has an orthotropic deck for both its cable-stayed bridge and bascule span. The Danziger Bridge of New Orleans is a very large vertical lift bridge.

The Mumbai Trans Harbour Link, also called Atal Setu, is India's first orthotropic steel deck bridge. It connects South Mumbai to Navi Mumbai's JNPT (Nhava Sheva) and has reduced travel time between Mumbai and Pune, Navi Mumbai, Goa and other cities in the south east of Pune.

=== Bridge deck replacements ===
It is possible to refit a bridge originally designed with a concrete or non-structural deck to use a lighter orthotropic deck, which has been done to preserve or extend the load-carrying life of key or landmark bridges around the world.

It was first utilized in North America in 1975, on the Lions Gate Bridge in Vancouver, which was completed in 1938 with exceptionally light design. The original concrete deck of the 670 m (2,200 ft) North Viaduct of the Lions Gate Bridge was replaced with a lighter and wider orthotropic deck, carried out in sections using a series of short closures of the bridge. Cantilever orthotropic decks allowed the Tamar Bridge to remain open whilst the main deck was replaced in 1999. An ambitious orthotropic replacement of the entire original suspended structure of the main suspension portion of the Lions Gate Bridge was undertaken 2000–2001 and completed without interruption in peak-hour traffic, resulting in the 63-year-old bridge, not designed for durability, getting a new lease of life.

Another notable example, San Francisco's Golden Gate Bridge, completed in 1937, originally used a concrete deck. Salt carried by fog or mist reached the rebar, causing corrosion and concrete spalling. From 1982 to 1986, the original bridge deck, in 747 sections, was replaced with lighter, stronger orthotropic steel deck panels over 401 nights without closing the roadway completely to traffic. The project not only restored the bridge to prime condition but also reduced the deck weight by 12,300 tons (11,160 metric tons).

== See also ==
- Bridge deck
