= George Hüfner =

German-born teacher (c. 1630 – 1691)

- Born: c. 1630
- Died: 1691 (aged 60–61); Moscow, Russia
- Occupations: Dramaturge; theatre director; translator
- Writing career
- Language: Russian

George Hüfner (also known as Yuri Mikhailovich Givner and Yuri Gibner; c. 1630 – 1691) was a German-born teacher who lived in the German Quarter of Moscow and acted as a translator for the Embassy Order. In 1675, he was the director of the court theater for Tsar Alexei Mikhailovich. Hüfner is credited as the director and possibly the author of one of the earliest Russian plays, the Temir-Aksakov plot (comedy about Tamerlane and Bayezid). Researchers have identified features in Givner's plays that reflect elements of 17th-century English comedy, Western Russian school drama theatre, medieval miracles, and even court ceremonies.

He used historical narratives rather than the Bible as a source for his dramatic works, unlike his predecessor, Pastor Gregory. Temir-Aksakov's Action described the struggle between the Central Asian Emir Timur (Tamerlane) and the Ottoman Sultan Bayezid Lightning, which ended with the defeat of the Ottomans and the capture of the Sultan at the Battle of Ankara in 1402.

== Biography ==
According to most sources, George Hüfner was a native of Saxony, although there is a version about his possible origin "from Moscow Germans". In 1649 he went to Poland, where he entered the military service of the hetman Wincenty Gosiewski. During the Russian-Polish war, Hüfner was captured after the capture of Dubrowna and brought to Smolensk in 1656. Prominent members of the Moscow foreign colony, colonels Johann von Hoven and Wilim Bruce, having learned that the prisoner was "a learned man, capable of learning Latin and German", obtained permission for him to go to Moscow and become a teacher in the German Sloboda. Soon Hüfner married the daughter of one of the inhabitants of Sloboda, Andrei Ut, and got his own court. Since the beginning of the 1670s the name of the Saxon was fixed in Russian texts as Yury Givner (Hüfner) or "Yuriy Mikhailov". This variant was reflected in the comedy of A. N. Ostrovsky's comedy Comedian of the 17th century (1872), one of the characters of which is the German teacher Yuri Mikhailov. The Soviet literary scholar P. N. Berkov also noted that Hüfner was called Yakov in a number of documents.

In 1672, Johann Gottfried Gregor, rector of the Church of St. Peter and Paul and master of the University of Jena, was entrusted with the management of the first court theater. Hüfner and his relative —the painter and "master of perspective" Peter Engels (Ingles)— were among the closest collaborators of the pastor. On February 16, 1675, Gregor died, and Hüfner took over the management of the theater. In a short time, he staged several productions, including the three-act Comedy about Tamerlane and Bajazet, compiled from various sources. At the end of 1675, on the recommendation of the Smolensk voivode Prince Mikhail Golitsyn, the management of the theater was transferred to the former teacher of the Kiev-Bratsk college, Stepan Chizhinsky, and Hüfner returned to the post of teacher of Latin and German languages with a salary of "55 rubles, 8 altyns daily".

When in the summer of 1679 Andrew Vinius was promoted to clerk of the Apothecary's Order, Hüfner was invited to fill the vacant position in the Embassy Office on the advice of other translators. On a special examination he showed sufficient knowledge of German, Dutch and Latin languages, as well as the ability to speak and write Russian. The official appointment took place on October 25, 1679, the salary was defined in "65 rubles and 9 altyns daily", — that is, in total, according to the calculation of the order, 163 rubles 55 kopecks a year. In 1683 Givner was sent with stolnik Pyotr Potemkin to France and Spain, but arbitrarily returned to Moscow before the end of the embassy, for which he was temporarily deprived of his salary. The same year he was put on bail for insulting the foreigner Colonel Olaf von Gran.

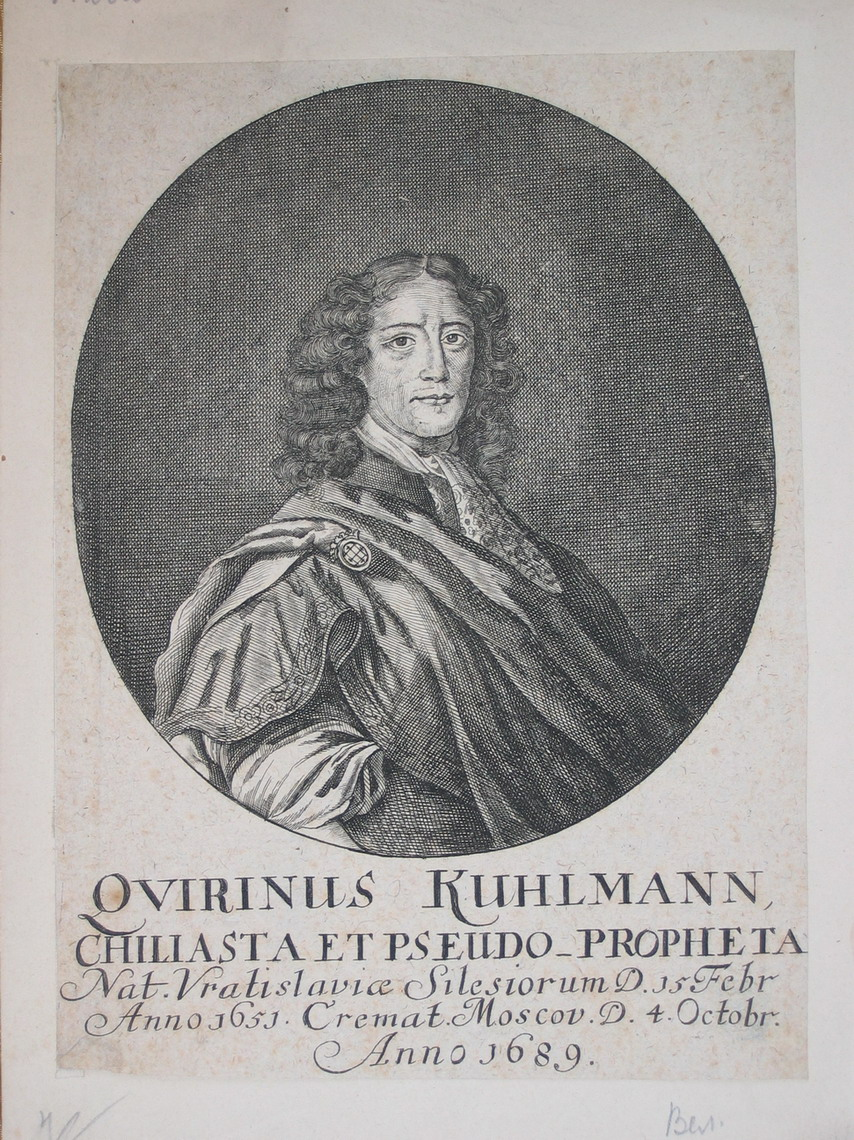
Quirinus Kuhlmann (1651-1689). 18th century's print

Being an ardent Lutheran, the translator opposed the mystic writer Quirinus Kuhlmann, who came to Moscow in 1689. According to cultural historian A. M. Panchenko, "the fact that the Jesuits opposed Kuhkmann does not need any comments. Another interesting fact was that Lutherans, pastors Meineke and Bartold, and translator of the Embassy Order Yuri Mikhailovich Hüfner expressed an even harsher opinion about Kuhkmann". Hüfner and another employee of the Embassy Order, clerk Ivan Tyazhkogorsky, familiarized themselves with the papers seized from Kuhkmann and compiled the so-called Translators' Opinion, which was then attached to the search case. The authors of the Opinion wrote about Kuhkmann and his Moscow patron, merchant Conrad Norderman, that they:

"believed in that heresy called Quakory, of which there are many in the Holand and English lands and other places in the region, similar to the schismatics here: they live in a peculiar way, and have everything in common, and do not honor anyone, and before monarchs do not take off their hats, and not only their sovereigns, but also do not call them lords, and they say that the only Lord God reigns over them, and they, monarchs, are people like them".

On October 4, 1689, Kuhlmann and Norderman were executed on Red Square for "hereticism" and disrespect for the tsar's authority. Hüfner's intolerance towards "alien" Europeans led to the fact that in 1690 he was accused of insulting Catholics according to a "klyausa". The Polish resident complained to Tsar Ivan Alexeevich: "He, George, distributed in New German Quarter letters about the expelled Jesuits, of their existence in Moscow by Luther and Calvin, in scolding and in mockery at them, Jesuits". As a result, Hüfner's salary was delayed for six months. A few months later, he died.

== Court theater activities ==
=== The first play ===
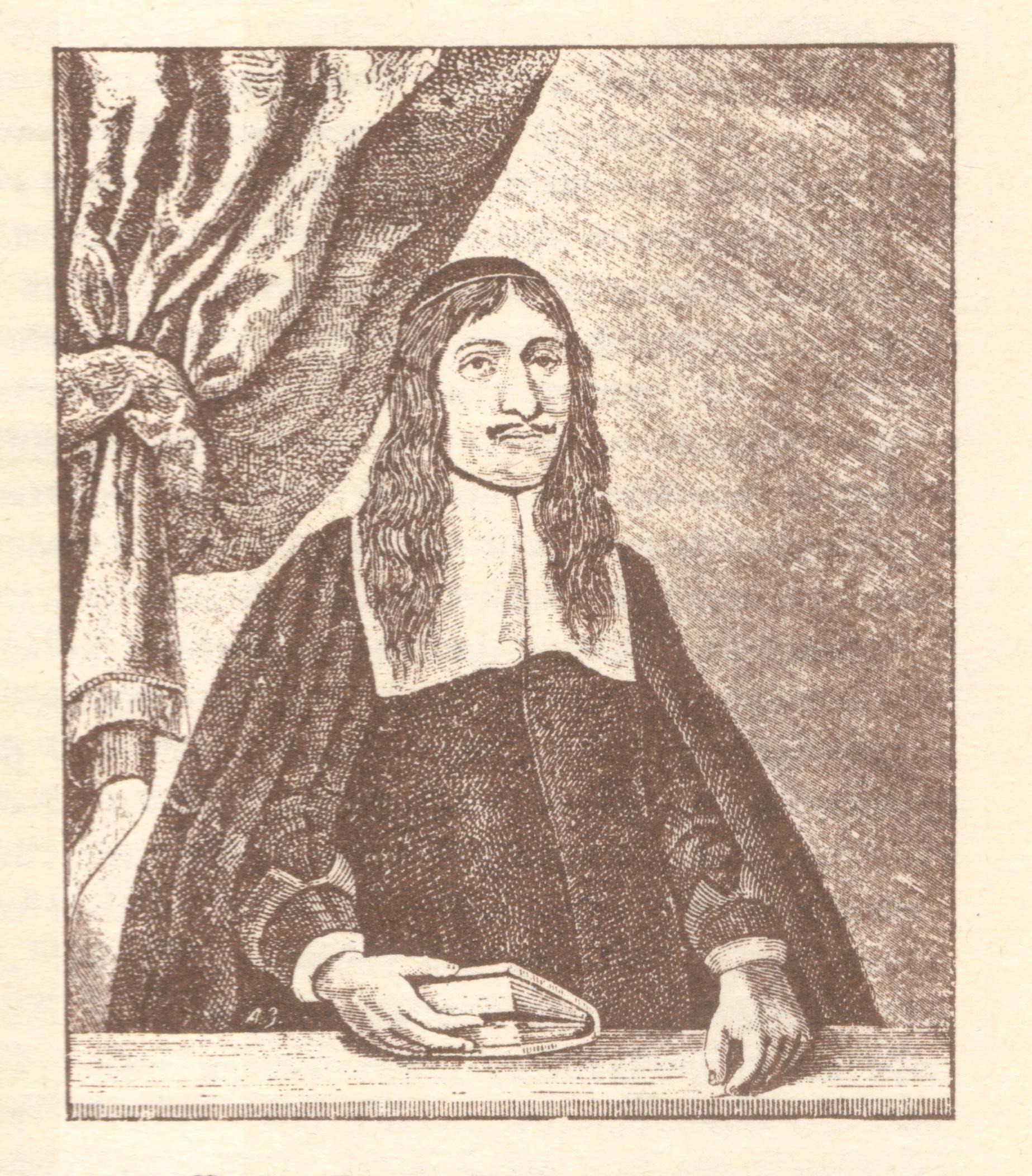
Johann Gottfried Gregory (1631-1675). Print by S. Grimm (1667)

Alexei Mikhailovich wanted to organize his court life like European royal courts and was aware that theatrical performances were an important part of the entertainment of Western European monarchs. The sovereign entrusted the organization of the Russian theater to Artamon Matveev, the manager of the Embassy Order and the tutor of Tsarina Natalia Kirillovna. On May 15, 1672, Matveev sent Colonel Nikolai von Staden to Courland with the instruction to hire two people in Riga "who could create all kinds of comedies". In Moscow, however, little hope was placed in this mission, and almost immediately after von Staden's departure, the court turned to the German Quarter, where amateur productions were occasionally performed. (Note: Information about the performance organized by foreigners in 1664 in the embassy house on Pokrovk has been preserved.)

On June 4, just six days after the birth of Tsarevich Peter Alekseevich, there was a royal decree that Pastor Gregory, without waiting for foreign directors, should "create a comedy". (Note: In the theatrical practice of that time, the term "comedy" denoted any stage performance.) The production had to "act out the Book of Esther from the Bible". The plot for the first performance was not chosen by chance: the story of Esther resembled the story of Natalia Naryshkina's election as the bride of Alexei Mikhailovich and, therefore, was expected to arouse great interest at court. A large amount of money was allocated for the production —695 rubles— and the manuscript of Artaxerxes' Action was later presented to the Tsar and bound in morocco with gilding by his order. Written by Gregory in German, the text of the play in seven acts (Artaxerxes' Action) was translated into Russian in the Embassy Order. Y. K. Begunov points out that the translators were the scrivener Peter Dolgovo and the nobleman Ivan Poborsky. The participation of scrivener Ivan Yenak is presumed.

Rehearsals began on September 21 in the parsonage. The play was performed by the sons of "various ranks of foreign servants and merchants" from German Quarter. According to the historian S. K. Bogoyavlensky, the artists were students of the Lutheran school. Literary scholars N. K. Gudzii and V. V. Kuskov also believed that the artists were students of the Lutheran school. Kuskov estimated that there were 60 people in Gregory's troupe. Contemporary researcher K. A. Kokshenyova writes about 64 actors, noting that female roles were played by men.

Hüfner, together with his teacher Johann Palzer and the author of the famous notes on Russia, physician Lavrentiy Ringuber, supervised the work on the text of the roles, designed to be performed for many hours. Timothy Hasencruch and Simon Gutovsky were responsible for the musical accompaniment of the performance. On October 17, 1672, in the village of Preobrazhensky near Moscow, the first performance of Artaxerxes' Action took place. For this purpose, a wooden "Comedy House" with an area of 90 square meters was built on the bank of the Yauza River, with about 55 square meters occupied by the stage. Subsequent performances were held there, and in wintertime, in the Kremlin, in the upper chambers of the Apothecary's order, where at the end of January 1673, under the guidance of the Streltsy centurion Danila Kobylin, the "Potyeshny Yard" ("A Funny Yard") was organized. The scenery was transported and mounted on both stages of the theater.

=== Hüfner as a director ===
In 1673–1674, the troupe was supplemented by 26 Russian podjaks and bourgeois children, although the pay for foreigners remained higher. (Note: The petition of a participant of the "comedy act" scribe Vasily Meshalkin "and his comrades" to Alexei Mikhailovich in June 1673 is known: ".... Your, great sovereign, salary to us ... nothing has been taught to us, and now we ... all the days go to the master and learn from him, dressed in rags and shabby boots, and nothing to drink and eat". The tsar ordered that each of the comedians be given 4 daily payment", except Sundays.) At the same time, in Moscow, a state acting school was opened at the yard of the Dane Vinonta Ludden — one of the first educational institutions of this kind in Europe. By the end of 1674, the school had trained more than seventy "playgoers": children and adults of different ranks, with each student receiving an altyn per day. The 19th-century historian S. M. Solovyov exclaimed: "Thus the theater school was founded in Moscow before the Slavic Greek Latin Academy!"

Classes at the school were held mainly during fasts, when courtiers could not watch performances for religious reasons; many students were taken to the Germans under guard and "held by force". During these years, Gregory and Hüfner staged "biblical" plays: Judith (Holofernes' Action), A Pity Comedy about Adam and Eve, A Comedy about Tobias the Younger, and A Small Cool Comedy about Joseph. In addition, the court theater performed a French dance staged by the engineer Nicholas Lim, and on Shrovetide in 1675, the tsar was shown a musical performance of Orpheus — an arrangement of Heinrich Schütz's ballet Orpheus and Eurydice (1638), made by Chizhinsky.

Hüfner also actively participated directly in the organization of productions, as indicated by numerous receipts for comedy costumes and money for the preparation of props. Together with the pastor and artists, he presented himself to Alexei Mikhailovich and received a reward of about 1500 rubles at the exchange rate of the early 20th century. In the list of guests admitted to the tsar's hand at the solemn reception in the Kremlin on April 7, 1673, the name of "teacher Mikhailov" stands immediately after Gregory. After replacing the pastor in February 1675, Hüfner began to prepare new performances: Comedy about Saint the Brave and Temir-Aksakov's Action. The director's assistants were Lavrenty Blumentrost (Gregory's stepfather) and Ivan Volosheninov, a "talker" from Meshchanskaya Sloboda.

In his work with the artists, Hüfner focused on the manner of performance adopted in the German theater of the 17th century. Each actor had to affectively "represent" all the signs of passions and feelings that his character was endowed with. Hüfner's productions used sound and light effects and rather complex props. For example, in Temir-Aksakov's Action, real armed horsemen participated. The stage depicted a "cannon ridge" and "shooting rockets". The plays were decorated with picturesque scenery, arranged on a backstage system, using special "frames of perspective writing" in combination with a trellis curtain. For the manufacture of 32 decorations, Peter Engels and Andrei Abakumov, who worked in the village of Sofronov, were provided with 700 arshins of canvas and "any other attire" on 18 wagons in the summer of 1675. With Hüfner, the "upper room of three sazhen" and "hay" were added to the "choromina" in Preobrazhenskoe. Additionally, in the fall of 1675, a second theater school opened in Meshchanskaya Sloboda for natives of the Polish-Lithuanian Commonwealth, but it lasted less than half a year. The performances did not achieve the previous success, and, receiving an insignificant salary ("3 rubles per month, plus 6 measures of bread, oats on the same, and a pud of salt for the year"), Hüfner was not honored with a personal tsar's award.

=== The importance of theater ===
From the very beginning, the theater was fully financed by the treasury, using revenues from the Vladimir, Galicia, and Novgorod regions. In addition to the royal family and invited nobles, some servants and foreign diplomats were allowed to attend the performances. The public was notified about the performances by "special falconers" and "horse stables". According to A. M. Panchenko, "the official culture... recognized only the art of singing, considering musical instruments as scomorokh attributes". Nevertheless, according to the testimony of the traveler Jacob Reitenfels, the action of the plays was accompanied by the sound of the orchestra of the court men of boyar Matveev, trained by German musicians:

"In another place, it would have been necessary to apologize before the performance for not everything being done properly; but in this case, it would be completely unnecessary: the costumes, the freshness of the stage, the majestic word... and the quality of the unheard music made the happiest impression on the Russians and gave them complete pleasure, earning them astonishment".

"Comedies" that followed Artaxerxes' Action were written immediately in Russian and were characterized by external entertainment, an abundance of farcical scenes, and crude naturalism. At the end of the "disgrace," the spectators went to the bath to wash off the "disgrace of the soul". The behavior of the characters was marked by a special "vividness" associated with the aesthetic requirement of "life-like" representation. The remarks described in detail the movements, poses, gestures, and facial expressions of the characters.

The energetic, active person was one of the literary ideals of the Russian Baroque era. The plays of the 1670s reflected the prevailing ideas in society about the dynamism of existence, which was perceived as a performance: "And what is going on in the whole universe except joy and sorrow? One person joyfully plays, and the other sadly plays and will soon turn into happiness".

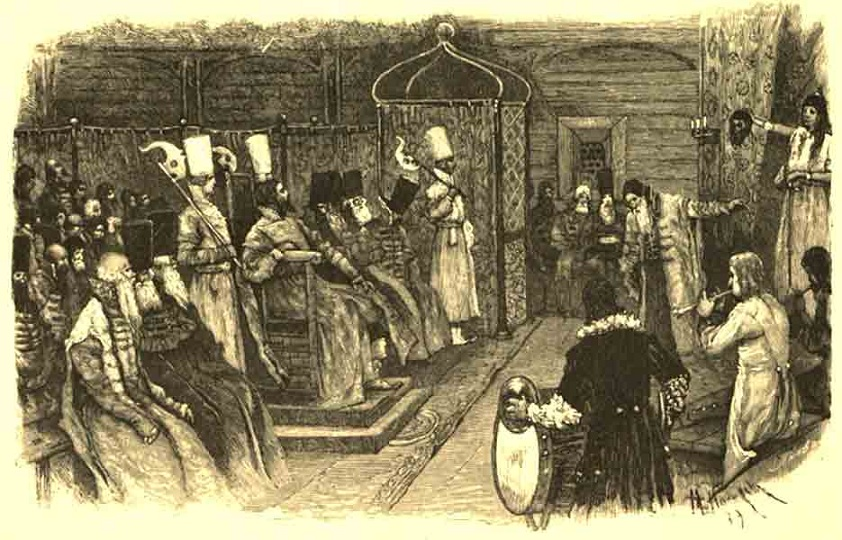
"Judith performance on the stage of the Preobrazhensky Theater on November 24, 1674 in the presence of Tsar Alexei Mikhailovich". Print by A. Yanov from a drawing by M. Nesterov (1895)

The theater was shielded from accusations of sinfulness by moral prologues read from the stage before performances began. In addition to summarizing the play, these prologues included abstract reasoning: "Nothing frightens a man as much as the expectation of future events, about which he is both anxious and sorrowful. That is why we cannot reveal the hidden aspects of our nature, nor can we know whether they are for good or for ill".

Over time, "comedy fun" became not only an important part of court life and a means of ideological education but also a form of public service. Attendance at these performances was mandatory for the boyars and certain courtiers. However, theater historian E. G. Kholodov noted that "mandatory did not equate to compulsion". Often, the tsar's cronies avoided attending the theater under various pretexts, as evidenced by documents from Ivan Polyansky, clerk of the Order of Secret Affairs.

Chizhinsky, who replaced Hüfner shortly before the death of Alexei Mikhailovich, managed to stage two comedies, About David with Goliath and About Bacchus with Venus. However, the new tsar, Feodor Alexeevich, and his relatives, the Miloslavsky, did not favor this form of entertainment. By February 1676, the main theater advocate, Artamon Matveev, had been exiled to Pustozersk, and the "comedy" rooms were left empty. It wasn't until thirty years later that Tsarevna Natalya Alekseevna resumed theater performances in Preobrazhensky.

== Writings ==
Of the plays that comprised the repertoire of the Comedy House, only Judith and Esther have survived in their entirety. Comedy about Tamerlan and Bajazet is known from several incomplete manuscripts, while the content of the Comedy about George the Brave, based on the life of the patron saint of Moscow, George the Victorious, has been reconstructed from the inventory of props and costumes. Consequently, the hypothesis of Hüfner's sole authorship is not universally accepted by experts. However, the involvement of the theater's head in the writing of these works is undisputed.

After becoming a translator for the Embassy Order, Givner shifted away from literary pursuits, yet he did not become an ordinary employee. Although the order functioned as a sort of "literary center" throughout the 17th century, its staff included few translators from multiple languages, and even fewer independent authors. Hüfner, who spoke four languages, was an unusual figure in this regard. (Note: The researcher of Russian literature S. I. Nikolaev notes that in the 1670s the German Leontius Gross and the Greek Nikolai Spathari knew Latin in the order, except for Hüfner.) In the 1680s, he translated not only diplomatic documents but also a wide variety of other materials. For example, in 1686, Hüfner participated in translating the Book of Firearms Art published in Strasbourg, for which he was awarded "five arshins of broadcloth and ten arshins of otlasu". The National Library of Russia list also preserves his translation of the Calendar for the year 1690 by the German mathematician Johann Heinrich Focht, titled in Russian Calendar of Domestic and Medicinal, as well as of War and Peace.

=== Temir-Aksakov Action ===
The Temir-Aksakov Action is based on the plots of tragedies about Tamerlane by Christopher Marlowe (1587–1588) and Juan de Guevara (1668), as well as materials from Jean du Beck's book The History of Tamerlane the Great (1594). There is also speculation about a distant connection between the Action and the Tale of Temir-Aksak, a historical work from the early 15th century about the miraculous rescue of Moscow from Timur's invasion. V. A. Bochkaryov identified direct parallels between the comedy and the Tale, particularly the episode involving Temir-Aksak's prophetic dream.

The prologue of the Action emphasized the value of secular plays, stating: "Comedy can cheer up a man and turn all human misery into joy". It was noted that the performance elucidates the meaning of historical events, as theater can offer many valuable teachings. "From such lessons, one can understand past incidents, which will not be forgotten, and find answers in the ancient chronicles. From these insights, we can learn wisdom, to reject all villainy and embrace all that is good". The plot of the play was particularly relevant due to the impending war with Turkey. Notably, a significant scene featured Tamerlane asking his soldiers whether they could "overcome the entire Turkish state", to which they affirmed. It is worth noting that around the same time, tragedies like Jean Racine's Bajazet (1672) and Nicholas Rowe's Tamerlane (1702) were also written, filled with allusions to the political situation in Europe.

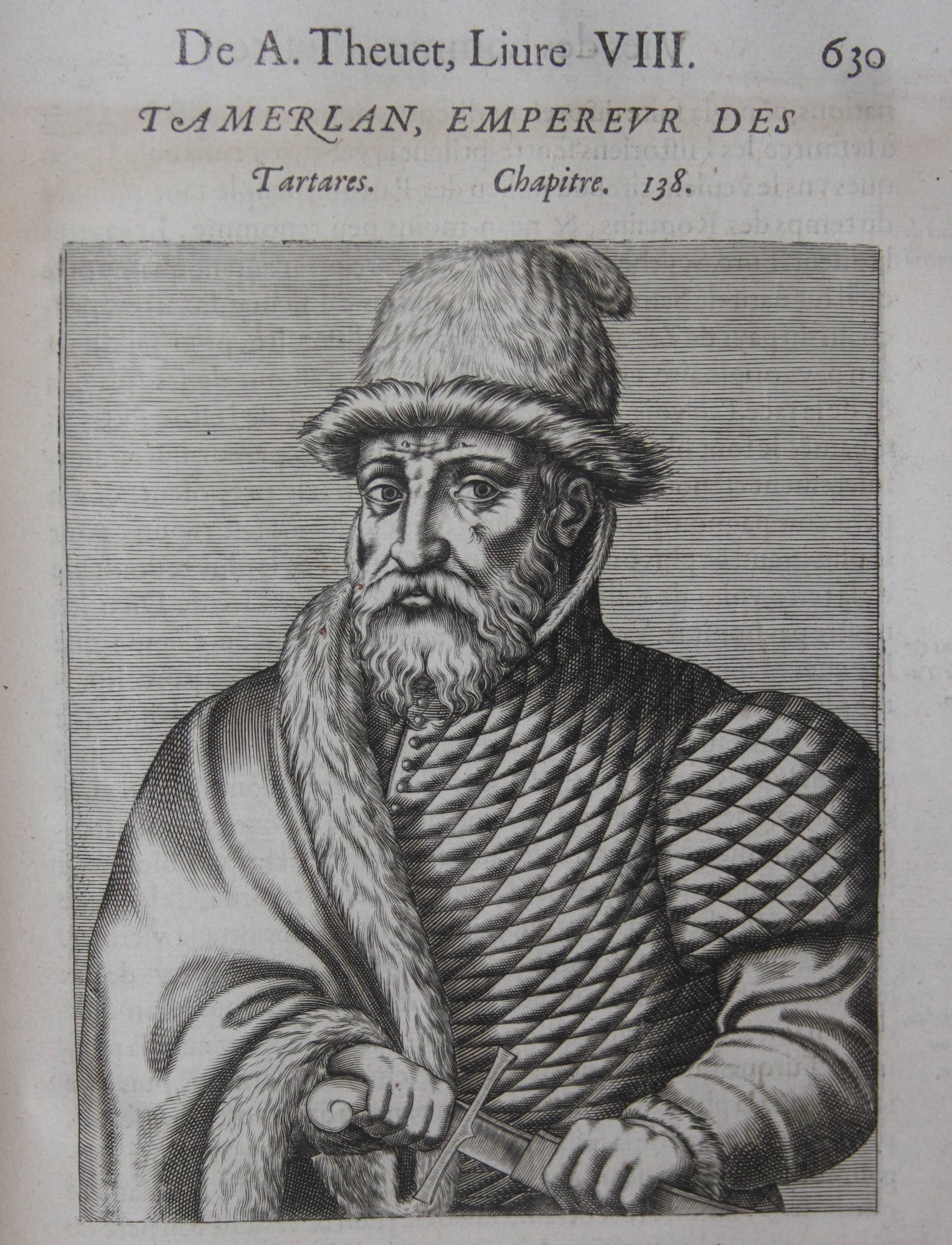
Tamerlane, Emperor of Tartary. Print by André Thevet (1584)

In the Temir-Aksakov Action, events unfold over the course of about a month, though approximately ten days are directly depicted. The central theme of the play is the notion of a virtuous king as the protector of all Christian nations. Tamerlane, or Temir-Aksak, is portrayed as an Orthodox ruler who defends his co-religionists from the Greek land of Caesar Paleologos, who are oppressed by the impious Saltan. Givner drew upon the European "chivalric" tradition for this portrayal; however, in Russian chronicles and monuments (such as The Tale of the Icon of the Vladimir Mother of God and the chronographs of 1441 and 1512), Tamerlane is depicted as a ruthless conqueror. Bayezid, in the play, arrogantly declares:

"I swear that bloodshed and slaughter will not cease until all humanity acknowledges Bayezid as the god of the earth... It is fitting for a warrior to rob and kill, to leave no baby in the womb, and to ensure that not a single dog remains alive in the entire Greek land".

Upon learning of the threat through the "mail with sheets," Temir-Aksak is primarily concerned for the subjects of "Caesar": "I am not only saddened for my brother and ally Palaiologos, but even more for the simple innocent souls who are being oppressed". However, the Orthodox sovereign remains hopeful, asserting: "After the evil weather, the sun will shine". Temir-Aksak further declares, "I was sent from heaven to subdue and correct his [Bayezid's] arrogance, for the Lord God punishes the proud, using His power to bring down the arrogant and exalt the humble." He then sends an angry letter to Bayezid:

Temir-Aksak then sends an angry letter to Bayezid, declaring: "... And to you, beast-like robber, it will be wise to know from our crown that we will visit you with all our great power ... and with all your helpers, with a wickedly evil death, which only we can imagine, we will destroy you".

Following this, there is a "tumult" on stage as Temir-Aksak defeats the Turkish troops and imprisons Bayezid in a cage. In impotent rage, Bayezid—described as a "great barbarian and blood drinker"—smashes his head against the iron bars. The audience is warned that such a fate awaits anyone possessed by an unrighteous desire to conquer foreign lands. The political message of the Action is underscored in the final scene, where all the participants bow before the "peaceful" Alexei Mikhailovich, exclaiming: "Give, God, the Tsar happiness!"

Alongside the heroic characters, the performance featured "foolish persons" such as Pickelgerring and Telpel — jesters who bickered among themselves and stole wine and snacks from the soldiers. The alternation of bloody scenes with comic episodes brought Temir-Aksakov's Action closer to the repertoire of the theater of "English comedians" that was popular in Protestant Europe at the time.

=== Main editions ===
- Русские драматические произведения 1672—1725 гг (in Russian). Vol. V. 1 / сост. Н. С. Тихонравов. СПб.: Типография Д. Кожанчикова. 1874. p. 562.
- Ранняя русская драматургия (in Russian). Vol. V. 2. Русская драматургия последней четверти XVII и начала XVIII вв. / под ред. О. А. Державиной. М.: Наука. 1972. p. 368.

== Bibliography ==
- Асеев, Б. Н. (1977). Русский драматический театр от его истоков до конца XVIII в. (in Russian). М.: Искусство. p. 576.
- Бегунов, Ю. К. (1982). Ранняя русская драматургия (конец XVII — первая половина XVIII вв.) // История русской драматургии / отв. ред. Л. М. Лотман (in Russian). Vol. 1. Л.: Наука. pp. 28–57.
- Белоброва, О. А. (1992). Гивнер // Словарь книжников и книжности Древней Руси (in Russian). СПб.: Дмитрий Буланин. pp. 203–204. ISBN 5-86007-001-2
- Богоявленский, С. К. (1916). Гивнер, Юрий Михайлович // Русский биографический словарь / Изд. под наблюдением председателя Императорского Русского Исторического Общества А. А. Половцова (in Russian). Vol. 5. СПб.: Типография Г. Лисснера и Д. Собко. pp. 173–174.
- Бочкарёв, В. А. (1988). Русская историческая драматургия XVII—XVIII вв (in Russian). М.: Просвещение. p. 224. ISBN 5-09-000540-0
- Гудзий, Н. К. (1966). История древней русской литературы (in Russian). М.: Просвещение. p. 544.
- Дёмин, А. С. (1977). Русская литература второй половины XVII – начала XVIII вв.: новые художественные представления о мире, природе, человеке (in Russian). М.: Наука. p. 296.
- Дёмин, А. С. (1972). Русские пьесы 1670-х гг. и придворная культура // Труды Отдела древнерусской литературы ИРЛИ АН СССР (in Russian). Vol. XXVII. pp. 273–283.
- Дёмин, А. С. (1976). Робинсон А. Н. (ed.). Театр в художественной жизни России XVII в. // Исследования и материалы по древнерусской литературе (in Russian). Vol. 4. Новые черты в русской литературе и искусстве (XVII — начало XVIII вв.). М.: Наука. pp. 28–61.
- Державина, О. А. (1979). Арциховского А. В. (ed.). Театр и драматургия // Очерки русской культуры XVII в. (in Russian). М.: Издательство МГУ. pp. 126–141.
- Елеонская, Орлов О. В., Сидорова Ю. Н., Терехов С. Ф., Фёдоров В. И. (1969). История русской литературы XVII—XVIII вв (in Russian). М.: Высшая школа. p. 364.
- Ерёмин, И. П. (1948). Лебедев-Полянский П. И. (ed.). Московский театр XVII в. // История русской литературы (in Russian). Vol. II. Part 2. Л.: Издательство АН СССР. pp. 368–373.
- Каган, М. Д. (1996). Драматургия // Литература Древней Руси: биобиблиографический словарь / под ред. О. В. Творогова (in Russian). М.: Просвещение ISBN 5-09-005922-5. pp. 44–46. Archived from the original on 2020-02-06. ISBN 5-09-005922-5
- Кудрявцев, И. М. (1963). Сикорский Н. М. (ed.). «Издательская» деятельность Посольского приказа (к истории русской рукописной книги во второй половине XVII в.) // Книга: исследования и материалы. Сб. VIII (in Russian). М.: Издательство Всесоюзной книжной палаты. pp. 179–244.
- Кусков, В. В. (1989). История древнерусской литературы (in Russian). М.: Высшая школа. p. 304. ISBN 5-06-000248-9
- Мазон, А. (1958). «Артаксерксово действо» и репертуар пастора Грегори // Труды Отдела древнерусской литературы ИРЛИ АН СССР (in Russian). Vol. XIV. pp. 355–363.
- Николаев, С. И. (1989). Поэзия и дипломатия: из литературной деятельности Посольского приказа в 1670-х гг // Труды Отдела древнерусской литературы ИРЛИ АН СССР (in Russian). Vol. XLII. pp. 143–173.
- Одесский, М. П. Гивнер (1994). Кускова В. В. (ed.). Литература и культура Древней Руси: словарь-справочник (in Russian). М.: Высшая школа. p. 23. ISBN 978-5-06-002874-4. ISBN 5-06-002874-7
- Одесский, М. П. (2004). Поэтика русской драмы: последняя треть XVII — первая треть XVIII вв (in Russian). М.: Издательство РГГУ. p. 396. ISBN 5-7281-0689-7
- Панченко, А. М. (1963). Квирин Кульман и «чешские братья» // Труды Отдела древнерусской литературы ИРЛИ АН СССР (in Russian). Vol. XIX. pp. 330–347.
- Панченко, А. М. (1985). Литература второй половины XVII в. // История русской литературы XI — XVII вв. / под ред. Д. С. Лихачёва (in Russian). М.: Высшая школа. pp. 324–396.
- Парфёнов, А. Т. (1969). К вопросу о первоисточниках «Темир-Аксакова действа» (in Russian). Вестник МГУ. pp. 16–30.
- Смолина (Кокшенёва), К. А. (2001). Комедийная хоромина // 100 великих театров мира. М.: Вече. pp. 76–80. ISBN 5-7838-0929-2
- Софронова, Л. А. (1981). Поэтика славянского театра XVII — первой половины XVIII вв.: Польша, Украина, Россия (in Russian). М.: Наука. p. 262.
- Старикова, Л. М. (1988). Театральная жизнь старинной Москвы: эпоха, быт, нравы (in Russian). М.: Искусство. p. 334.
- Старинный спектакль в России / под ред. В. Н. Всеволодского-Гернгросса (in Russian). Л.: Academia. 1928. p. 386.
- Старинный театр в России / В. Н. Перетца (in Russian). Пг.: Academia. 1923. p. 180.
- Холодов, Е. Г. (1983). Лихачёв Д. С. (ed.). К истории старинного русского театра (несколько уточнений) // Памятники культуры: новые открытия. Ежегодник. 1981 (in Russian). Л.: Наука. pp. 149–170.
