= Rachka =

Location
- Country: Russia

Physical characteristics
- Source
  - location: Clean Ponds
  - coordinates: 55°45′40″N 37°38′37″E
- Mouth
  - location: Yauza
  - coordinates: 55°44′56″N 37°38′40″E
- Length: 1.8 km (1.1 mi)
- Basin size: 1.5 km^{2} (0.58 sq mi)

Basin features
- Progression: Yauza→ Moskva→ Oka→ Volga→ Caspian Sea

The Rachka (Russian: Рачка) is a small river located in the Basmanny and Tagansky Districts, in the Central Administrative Okrug, in the center of Moscow and a former left tributary of the Moskva. Today it flows into the Yauza, which itself is a left tributary of the Moskva.
