= Quirinus Kuhlmann =

German Baroque poet and mystic (1651-1689)

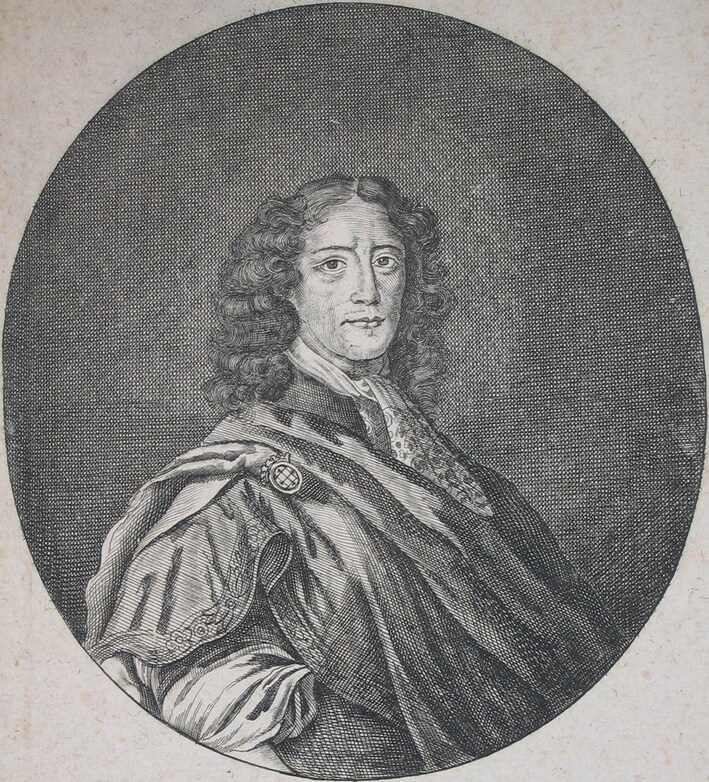
- 1689 engraved portrait of Kuhlmann
- Born: 26 February 1651; Breslau, Silesia
- Died: 4 October 1689 (aged 38); Tsardom of Russia
- Cause of death: Burned at the stake
- Occupation: Poet
- Notable work: Himmlische Liebes-Küsse (Heavenly Love-Kisses)
- Spouse: Maria Gould / Maria Anglicana (married 1685–d.1686)

Quirinus Kuhlmann (also: Culmannus, Kühlmann, Kuhlman; 26 February 1651 – 4 October 1689) was a German Baroque poet and mystic. Kuhlmann insisted upon the importance of the events of his life as confirmation of his divine mission.

Known for his travels throughout Europe, Kuhlmann spent the last years of his life in Russia, where he was executed because he was considered theologically and politically dangerous.

== Early life ==
Born in Breslau (Wrocław) in Silesia to a Lutheran merchant, Quirinus Kuhlmann studied at the Magdalena-Gymnasium with the help of a scholarship, as his father had died when Kuhlmann was young.

As a boy, Kuhlmann suffered from a speech impediment and was often mocked for his condition. Some scholars believe that this may have been why he began to frequent Breslau's libraries from an early age.

Kuhlmann's first book Unsterbliche Sterblichkeit of 100 epigrammatic Alexandrine quatrain epitaphs was published in 1668, before he left for the University of Jena in September 1670.

== Poetry ==
=== Heavenly Love-Kisses (1671) ===
Kuhlmann compiled an anthology of sonnets in Himmlische Liebes-Küsse (Love-Kiss XLI (The Mutability of Human Affairs), 1671), (the title being derived from Heinrich Muller's book) which depict the union of a human soul with Jesus Christ in a sequence of fifty Sonnets, in Alexandrine lines that hover between sixteen and seventeen syllables, of monosyllabic stem words, in individual notes or measures by Virgules, having an idiosyncratic sonnet rhyme scheme, and a complete permutation phrase, (Welchelsatz) in its first twelve lines. A modern verse poem form has been derived from Kuhlmann's XLI format.

It is a Proteus verse form constructed so that the words can be changed without destroying its meter or rhyme. (Harsdorffer's Poetischer Trichter (1648) providing Kuhlmann with the model for these sonnets) The language in the poem aspires to dramatize, in purely mathematical terms, its deepest theurgic vocation in Logos; to bring Cosmos into Being to perfect a poetic form that precipitates an experience of endless Parataxis.

The sonnet (including eight explicitly modelled on Song of Songs) with $13!$ (thirteen factorial, more than six billion) potential permutations, that contains the possibility of saying and knowing everything there is to know in the sciences and yet at the same time signal the utter vanity of such an attempt.

This "ideal" Kuhlmann poetic form, a parataxis, permutating, combinato mechanically combined to produce a clear expression of concepts and thus "Mathesis universalis" whereby all variations keep their sense, no "new" sense with a new message is produced and thereby to ascribe the powers of invention to a transcendent, combinatory God who alone has world and time enough to read all the sonnet's redundant permutations.

This fascination with combinatorics (a mechanical means of determining the possible permutations and range of a series of concepts by arrangement in tables, columns, triangular and circular charts) was fueled by Kuhlmann's discovery of Ars magna sciendi, sive Combinatoria (1669) by Athanasius Kircher.

=== Other ===
Kuhlmann's early poetry included a book of epicedia, or funeral poems (1668), an epithalamium (wedding poem, 1668), and a eulogy that praised a literary society called Fruchtbringende Gesellschaft ("Fruit-bringing society", 1670). As Gerhart Hoffmeister writes, "the acclaim he received made him feel like a 'second Opitz' – perhaps an early sign that he was becoming overly self-confident or even delusional before a grave illness (typhoid fever?) struck him in 1669."

Very little is known of Kuhlmann's residence in Jena (between September 1670 and August 1673), except that, in 1672 he produced his prose works 'Lehrreicher Gesschicht-Herold' and 'Lehrreiche Weißheit-Lehr-Hof-Tugend-Sonnenblumen preißwürdigster Sprüche' with over 500 aphorisms, short essays and 100 short moralistic stories

In Kuhlmann's Der Kuhlpsalter (1677) almost every poem contains allusions to Kuhlmann's life which is so inextricably interwoven with his poetry, that some knowledge of that life is necessary in order to interpret his poems.

Kuhlmann received the imperial laurels ("poetes laureates") in 1672 from the Graf of Schwarzburg-Rudolstadt after receiving attention for his paraphrases (i.e. Heavenly-Kisses XL1) of the Song of Songs and other mystical sources. Later at Leiden in 1673, Kuhlmann's prose became conversation with others, his poetry conversation with God.

== Mysticism ==
In 1669, at the age of eighteen, Kuhlmann stated he had experienced a prophetic vision, "Zug zu Gott", an illumination vision of Jesus Christ, after reading Jakob Böhme's Mysterium Magnum and after making the acquaintance of Johann Rothe and his followers became convinced he was the new Jesuel eschatologically announcing the "New Millennium", his poem Love-Kisses XL1 recording that birth.

Kuhlmann later enrolled at the University of Jena, staying from September 1670 through August 1673 with the purpose of studying law, but spent his time reading and writing mystical texts and did not produce a single poem (apart from those in his prose composed before he left Breslau).

Kuhlmann seems to have suffered from depression, and he was reported to have covered his walls with reflecting "turkish papers" to brighten his room in order to be transformed into a mystic mood.

At his native Breslau, he further neglected his studies and read some nine hundred books, inspiring him to write his own comprehensive history of the world, called Lehrreicher Geschicht-Herold (Instructive History-Messenger, 1672).

Kuhlmann left for Leiden in 1673 to further his studies where he was about to defend his law dissertation, Kuhlmann converted to Chiliasm and Mysticism and proclaimed himself a millenniarist, "son of the Son of God", and missionary to men of all faiths, causing him at the time to be described as "a representative of one of the main movements in religious fanaticism". Kuhlmann, later at Easter 1675, left for Lübeck, the centre of dissident movements.

He unsuccessfully attempted, both in Western and Eastern Europe – including visits to London and the East to attempt an audience with Mehmed IV, Sultan of the Ottoman Empire – to find adherents to his ideals, which included religious union and utopianism, upon which he expounded in his De Monarchia Jesuelitica (1682).

Kuhlmann's poetry was written with the messianic goal of having Protestant powers and Ottomans join forces to destroy Catholic Europe, the House of Habsburg, and the Pope and establish the "Kingdom of Jesus".

== Trial and execution ==
Kuhlmann was imprisoned in Arkangel before he traveled to Moscow in 1689 in order to convince Ivan V of Russia to join this alliance, and established himself in the German colony in Moscow.

In Moscow Kuhlmann lived in the house of an adherent named Conrad Nordermann. Eventually, however, both men were denounced by Joachim Meinecke, the chief pastor of Moscow Lutherans, as theologically and politically dangerous. They were arrested and tortured, Kuhlmann's trial took plenty of time, because he didn't speak any Russian and interpreters were needed. His works were also studied by people with necessary linguistic competence and were then classified as heretic. He was tortured but refused to accept the charges that he had been sent to Russia by someone's orders and his interrogators realized that he was a religious zealot, but not a spy. He was finally burned at the stake for heresy, along with his works.

== Legacy ==
Rudolf Borchardt (1877–1945) referred to Kuhlmann as "the greatest and most dangerous poet in German literature" and Kuhlmann's mystical poems, (which include the collection Der Kühlpsalter (1684–6)), each of which had a heading note, date and circumstance of its composition, influenced both the poetry of the late Baroque, and the movements of Pietism and Empfindsamkeit / Sensibility (1750s–1770s).

In 1962, Robert L. Beare wrote that "in recent years Quirinus Kuhlmann has been the subject of much interest, not merely because he is one of the most striking of German Baroque writers, but also because his life has unusual features not always associated with poets – seldom is a poet burned alive, no matter how critics may roast his work!"

== Works ==
- Unsterbliche Sterblichkeit (1668)
- Wedding Poem (1668)
- Fruit-bringing Society (1670)
- Heavenly-Kisses (1671)
- Sonnenblumen (1671)
- Instructive History-Messenger (1672)
- Kircheriana de arte magna sciendi sapientia (1681)
- De Monarchia Jesuelitica (1682)
- Der Kuhlpsalter (1684)
- Paralipomena (Chronicles on Kuhlpsalter) (1688)
