= Rostokino Aqueduct =

Aqueduct bridge in Moscow, Russia

Coordinates: 55.829°N 37.656°E

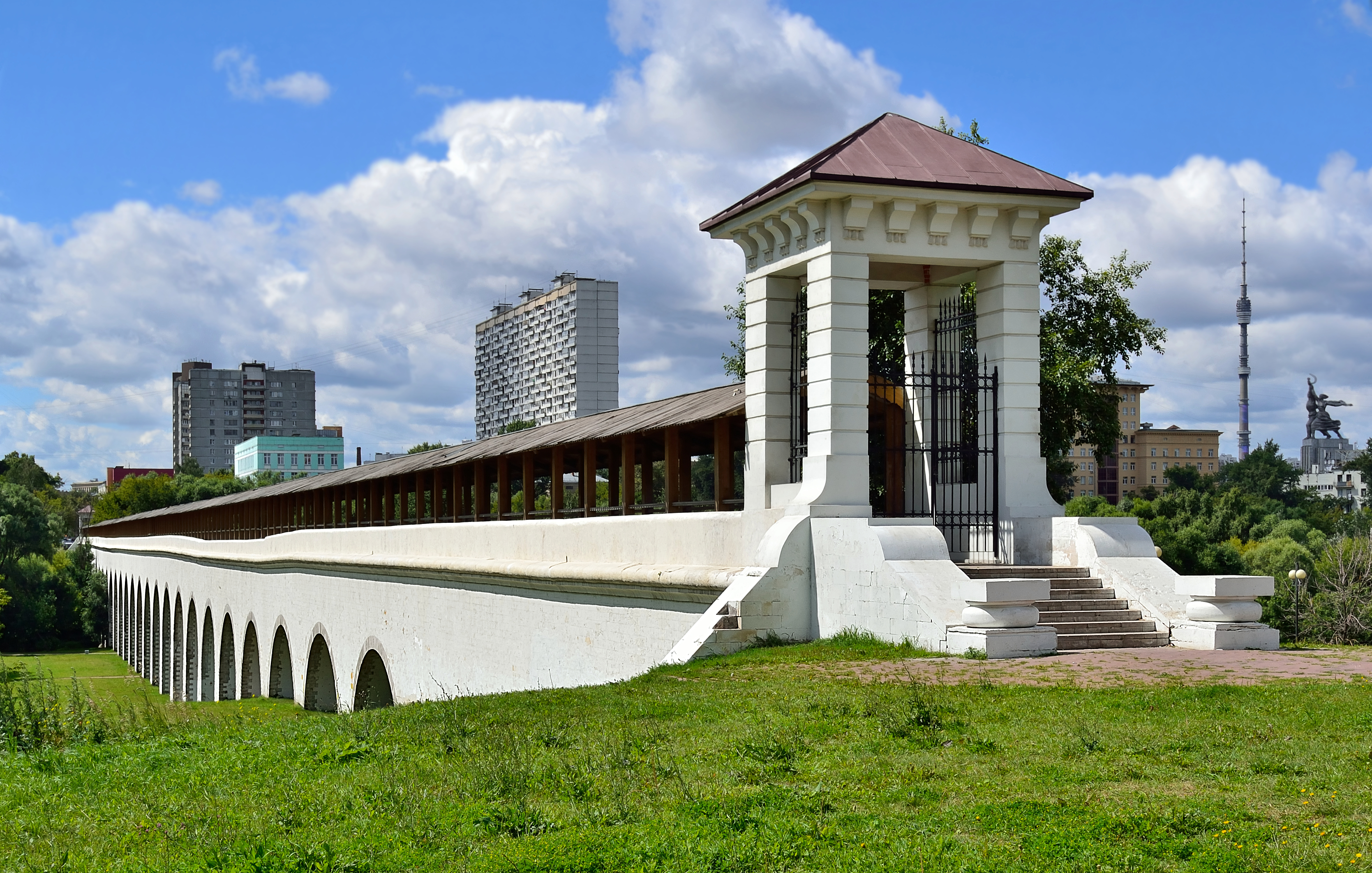
Rostokino Aqueduct

Rostokino Aqueduct, also known as Millionny Bridge, is a stone aqueduct over Yauza River in Rostokino District of Moscow, Russia, built in 1780-1804. It is the only remaining aqueduct in Moscow, once a part of Mytishchi Water Supply, Moscow's first centralized water utility.

== History ==
The aqueduct was commissioned by Catherine II of Russia to engineer Friedrich Wilhelm Bauer. Catherine authorized 1.1 million rouble expenditure and 400 soldiers. Builders used second-hand stone left by demolition of Bely Gorod fortifications. Construction, frequently interrupted, dragged for 25 years, as the soldier engineers were summoned to the war with Turkey (1787-1792) and various other jobs. In the process, both Catherine and Bauer died. Colonel Ivan Gerard lead the project after Bauer's death in 1783. Catherine's son, Paul I, had to issue 400,000 roubles financing; Alexander I added 200,000 roubles. Finally, the aqueduct was completed at an unprecedented cost of 2 million roubles, thus the name Millionny Bridge.

== Specifications ==
The total length is 356 metres (1,168 ft), the height over Yauza river level is 19 metres (62 ft). There are 21 arches, each spans 8.5 metres (28 ft). Original masonry water canal 0.9 metres (2 ft 11 in) wide and 1.2 metres (3 ft 11 in) high was replaced with iron pipe in the 1850s.

Water flowed naturally through a 20-kilometre masonry canal to a system of fountain taps; in 1892, the system was uprated with construction of pumps and water reservoires in the city. Mytishchi Water Supply was closed in 1937, when a superior water supply, a part of Moscow Canal project, was completed.

== Aqueduct Park ==
Between 2004 and 2007, the aqueduct underwent restoration and was converted into a pedestrian bridge. Specialists removed a heating main, installed railings and a decorative roof, and added architectural lighting. A park with comfortable pathways and benches was created around the architectural monument.

In 2013, the bridge and the surrounding area were transferred to the management of Sokolniki Park. The "Aqueduct Park" regularly hosts festivals and celebratory events, ranging from Christmas festivities to multimedia shows. The aqueduct's gallery is open to visitors on weekends and public holidays. In March 2018, plans for the further improvement of the park were announced. Later that same year, Aqueduct Park was transferred from Sokolniki Park to the management of the Rostokino District Housing Maintenance Office.

== Ichka Aqueduct (demolished) ==
A smaller, single-span aqueduct over Ichka river was built during the 1888-1892 modernization of Mytishchi system. It was destroyed in 1997 to make way for MKAD highway.

== See also ==
- List of bridges in Moscow
