= Rybenka =

Location
- Country: Russia

Physical characteristics
- Source
  - location: Sokolniki Park
- Mouth: Yauza
  - coordinates: 55.7845°N 37.7005°E
- Length: 5 km (3.1 mi)
- Basin size: 3.5 km^{2} (1.4 sq mi)

Basin features
- Progression: Yauza→ Moskva→ Oka→ Volga→ Caspian Sea

The Rybenka (Russian: Рыбенка or Рыбинка - Rybinka) is a small river in the north-east of Moscow, Russia. Rybenka is a right tributary to river Yauza. The length of the river is about 5 km (most of which flows through pipes underneath the city). The area of the river basin is 3.5 square kilometers. Rybenka runs through the western border of Sokolniki Urban Forest Park, across the Sokol'necheski Val, 2nd, 3rd Rybinskaya and Rusakovskiya streets into the river Yauza near the Elektrozavodsky (Electro-factory) bridge. On the mouth of the river and in an area of 3rd Rybinskaya street there used to be a series of ponds, once rich with fish (hence its name). Now the river runs primarily in the pipes underneath the city. The river history was preserved in the names of two streets in Sokolniki District of Moscow (near Sokolnicheskiy Val street) - 2nd and 3rd Rybinskaya streets.
