= Yauza (river) =

River in Moscow and Mytishchi, Russia

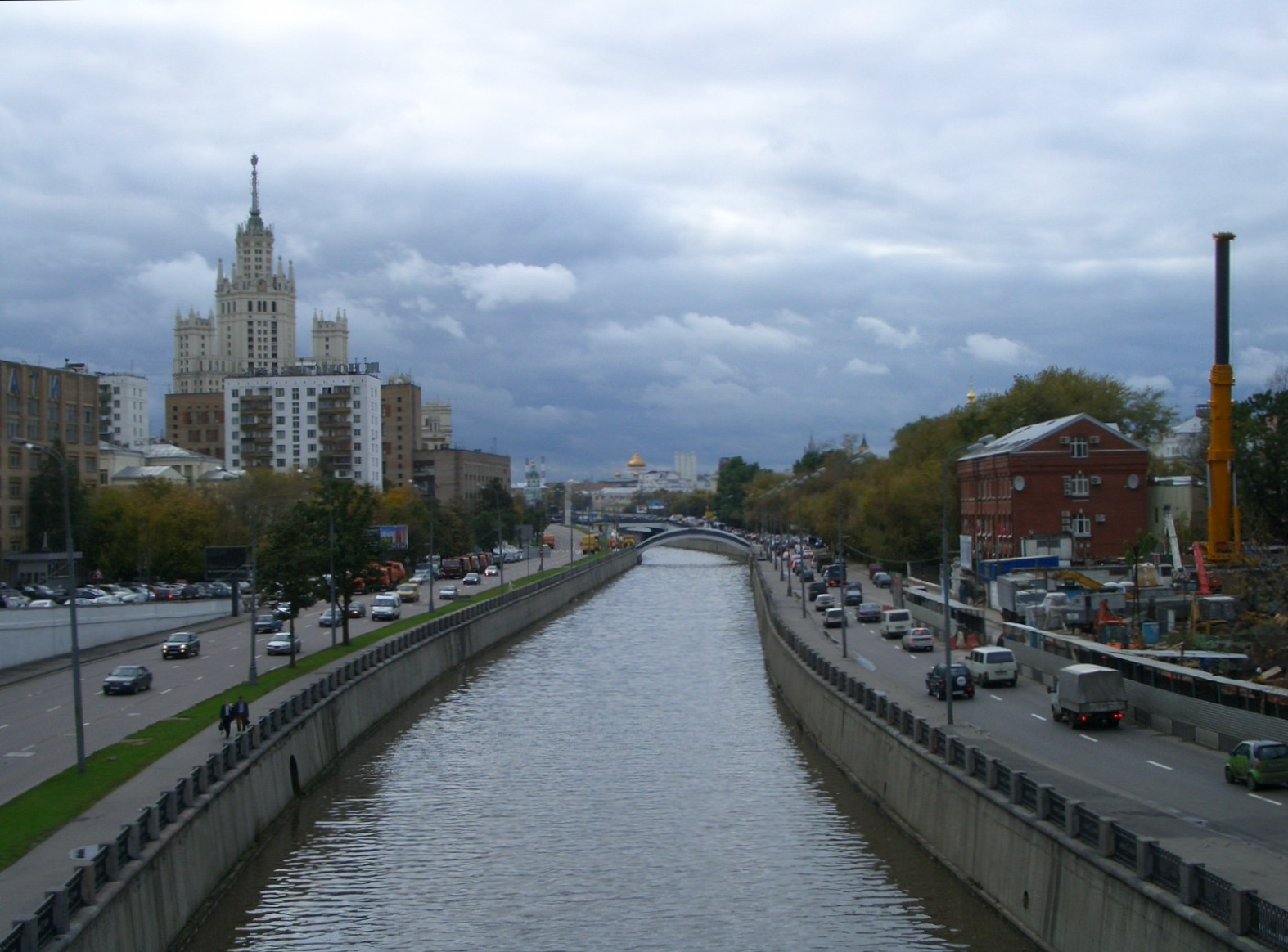
- The lower Yauza, less than one kilometer from the inlet

Location
- Country: Russia

Physical characteristics
- Source
  - location: Losiny Ostrov
  - coordinates: 55°52′40″N 37°53′19″E
- Mouth
  - location: Moskva
  - coordinates: 55°44′50″N 37°38′25″E
- Length: 48 km (30 mi)
- Basin size: 452 km^{2} (175 sq mi)
- Discharge
  - average: 9.4 m^{3}/s (330 cu ft/s)

Basin features
- Progression: Moskva→ Oka→ Volga→ Caspian Sea

The Yauza (Russian: Я́уза) is a river in Moscow and Mytishchi, Russia, a left and largest tributary of the Moskva in the Russian capital. It originates in the Losiny Ostrov National Park northeast of Moscow, flows through Mytishchi, enters Moscow in the Medvedkovo District and flows through the city in an irregular, meandering, generally north-south direction. The Yauza joins the Moskva River in Tagansky District just west of Tagansky Hill, now marked by the Kotelnicheskaya Embankment Building. Valleys of the Yauza, from the MKAD beltway in the north to the Moscow-Yaroslavl railway west of Sokolniki Park, are protected as natural reserves.

The Yauza has been mentioned in Russian chronicles since 1156; the exact origin of the name is unknown. Moscow crossed its former natural eastern boundary (marked by the Yauza) in the beginning of the 16th century. The banks of the Yauza within the Garden Ring were densely urbanized by the middle of the 17th century; upstream valleys housed suburban residences of the House of Romanov, from Mikhail to Catherine II. Settlements along the Yauza (German Quarter, Lefortovo, Preobrazhenskoye) played a significant role in the history of Russia in the 17th and 18th centuries.

Industrialization in the 19th and 20th centuries made the Yauza "the biggest gutter for waste in Moscow". In the 2000s the ecology improved, with the closing or conversion of old factories and cleanup efforts by the city government. In 2007 the Yauza waters were reclassified from "dirty" to "polluted" status, but in 2008 the trend reversed and pollution in the Yauza exceeded its 2006 levels. As of 2008, Yauza water passing the Moscow city boundary is rated as "polluted", and reaches a "very dirty" level at its inlet. Untreated surface runoff in the Central Administrative District remains the main source of pollution.

== Geology ==
The Yauza is arguably one of the most ancient European rivers. A proto-Yauza River first appeared in Permian-Triassic period, at which time it flowed to the east of its present riverbed, down today's Izmailovo Gully. After being periodically submerged during the Jurassic and Cretaceous periods, the region finally became land in the Tertiary period. Due to minor elevation changes, the Yauza diverted into its present course, with its former riverbed taken over by the present-day Serebryanka, which forms part of Yauza basin and flows in the westward direction opposite to the original Yauza.

== Geography ==
The Yauza is 48 kilometres (30 mi) long, and has a drainage basin of 452 square kilometres (175 sq mi). It consists of three parts:

The Upper Yauza flows from the marshes of Losiny Ostrov National Park (55°52′40″N 37°53′19″E). The lakes surrounding the river (55°52′38″N 37°50′24″E) were formed in the 20th century on abandoned peat-mining sites. A 1995 study identified twelve beaver colonies in the upper Yauza basin; large portions became a typical "beaver landscape".	After the river enters the city of Mytishchi, it flows through a chain of narrow valleys into Sokolniki Park deep inside Moscow.(55°49′24″N 37°40′19″E) The Yauza Valleys, zoned specially protected natural territories, are managed by city authorities as public parks.	Past Sokolniki, the Yauza enters a heavily industrialized area; below Glebovsky Bridge (55°48′22″N 37°42′7″E) it flows in a man-made channel shaped by granite embankments, with heavy traffic on both sides.

The Yauza collects waters from many tributaries, most of them confined to underground sewers (e.g. Rachka, Rybenka and Khapilovka). The few that remain on the surface, at least partially, are (north to south):

Western (right bank) tributaries	Eastern (left bank) tributaries
Sukromka (55°53′49″N 37°41′15″E); Chermyanka (12 km, 55°51′41″N 37°38′6″E); Likhoborka (16 km, 55°50′38″N 37°37′45″E); Kamenka (7 km, 55°50′26″N 37°37′56″E); Putyaev and Oleny brooks in Sokolniki Park	Ichka (12 km, 55°53′14″N 37°40′55″E); Budayka (4.4 km, 55°49′34″N 37°40′3″E); Khapilovka (all confined to sewer, 55°47′10″N 37°41′56″E) with tributaries Serebryanka (12 km) and Sosenka (9 km) running naturally through Izmaylovsky Park. This is the largest subsystem of the Yausa basin, with its own drainage basin of 75 square kilometers.

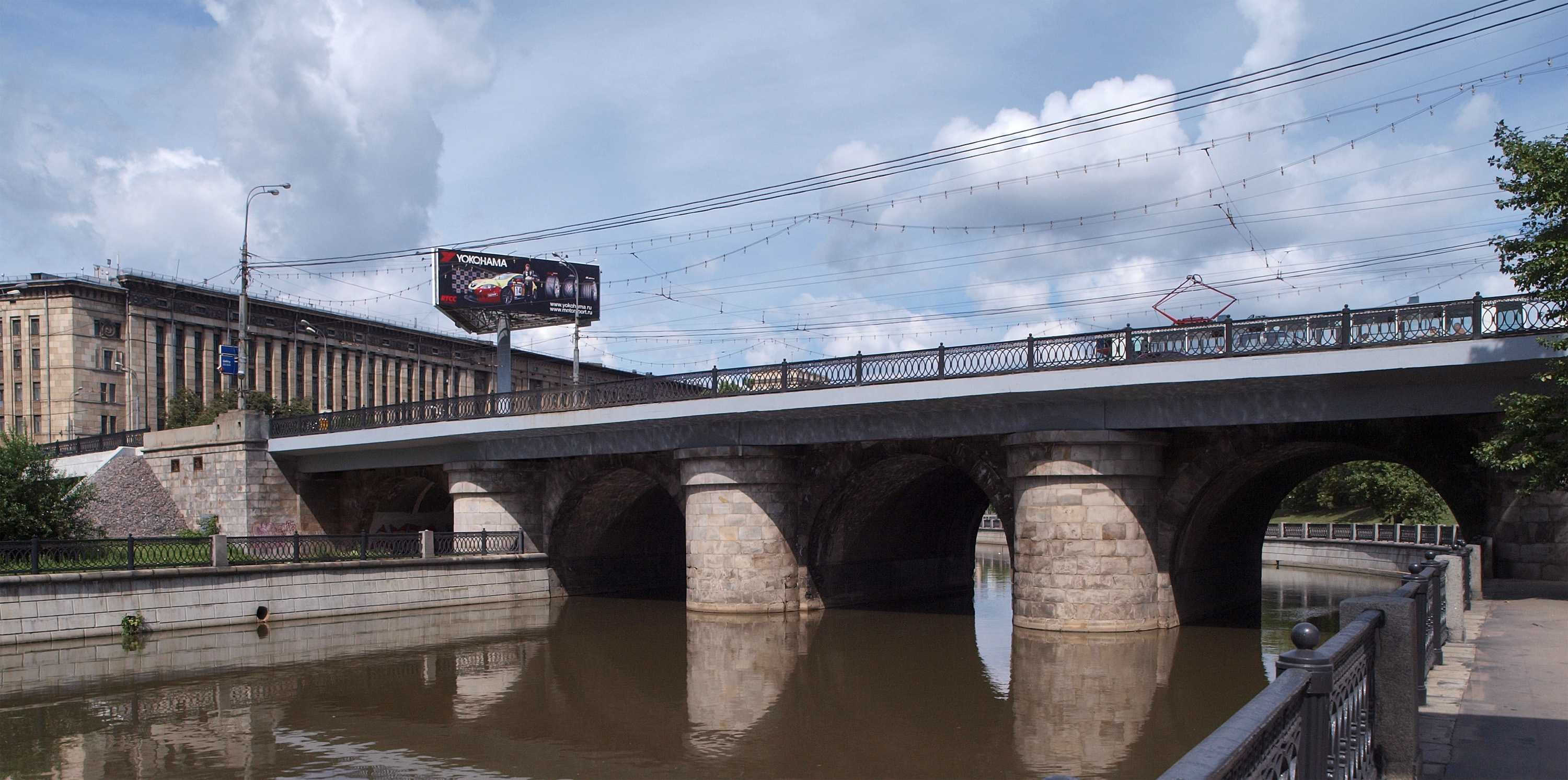
Lefortovsky Bridge, one of the oldest in Moscow, was built in 1777.

The flow of the Yauza is regulated (particularly in winter) and reinforced with water from the Volga that reaches the city through the Moscow Canal. 80 million cubic meters of Volga water is sourced each year from the Khimki Reservoir in northwest Moscow and fed through underground pipes and an open channel to Golovinsky Ponds and the Likhoborka River (a tributary of the Yauza). The water level in the lower Yauza is regulated by the Pererva Dam (55°40′21″N 37°42′51″E) on the Moskva River, and by the locks (55°45′23″N 37°40′16″E) on the Yauza itself east of Kursky Rail Terminal. Raised water levels in the downtown portion of the Yauza basin led to long-term flooding and death of trees deep inside Losiny Ostrov.

Within the city of Moscow the Yauza is spanned by 21 road bridges, five railroad bridges, one dedicated tram bridge, two Moscow Metro bridges, numerous pedestrian bridges and the historical Rostokino Aqueduct. Spring floods due to low clearance under old bridges were common, with four in the 1950s alone (1951, 1952, 1955 and 1957); they were practically eliminated when these bridges were rebuilt to modern standards. The most recent flash flood on the Yauza occurred August 14, 2003, following a record-setting rainfall. The Yauza and its valleys are not particularly prone to the landslides and erosion common in the western and southern districts of Moscow. There were two minor landslides on the Yauza in 2008, compared with 40 on the Chertanovka River and 33 on the Gorodnya River.

There is no commercial or recreational shipping, although the river is accessible to small motor boats as far as Preobrazhenskaya Square (55°47′42″N 37°42′14″E).

== History ==
=== Prehistory to the Time of Troubles ===
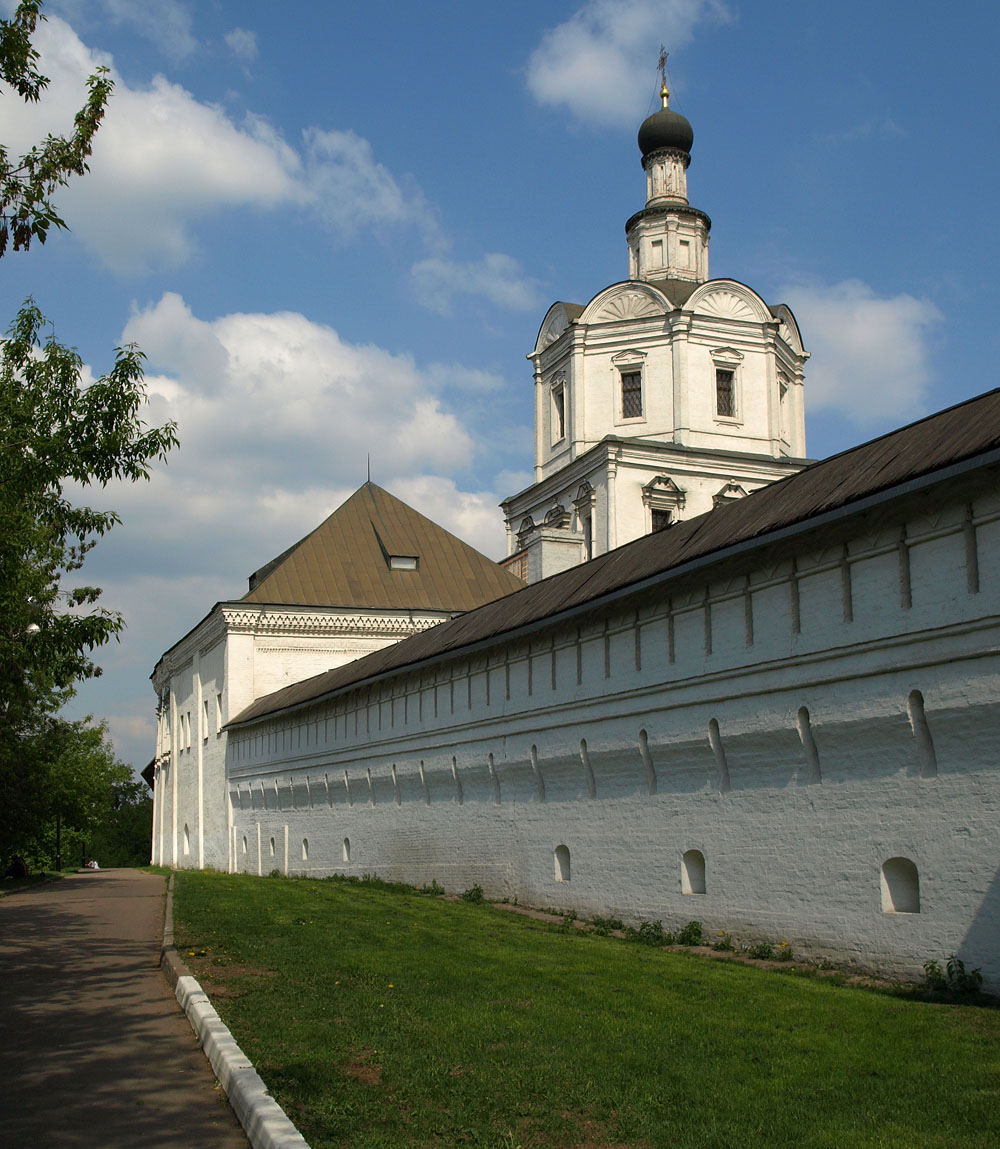
Fortified St. Andronik Monastery on the Yauza, part of the medieval defence ring around Moscow

The first mention of the Yauza (as Auza) in Russian chronicles is directly connected to the foundation of Moscow: according to the chronicles, in 1156 Yury Dolgoruky "founded Moscow at the estuary of Neglinnaya above the Yauza" on the site owned by Stepan Kuchka and known through another chronicle since 1147. There is no generally accepted etymology for Yauza or Auza. Similar toponyms (Auzas, Auzes, Auzi) exist in modern Latvia; the Baltic origins of Yauza are generally accepted but have not been proven.

Medieval Moscow grew from its Kremlin primarily in a northeasterly direction, towards the Yauza. St. Andronik Monastery on the Yauza (established in 1357) formed the eastern defence arc, together with the Pokrovsky and Novospassky monasteries. The Yauza was used as a commercial waterway from Moscow to Vladimir until the 16th century; boats that reached the upper Yauza were dragged over land to the Klyazma River. After the fire of 1494, Ivan III of Russia set up his country residence on the western bank of the Yauza in Vorontsovo (55°45′7″N 37°39′5″E). During the same period potters, blacksmiths and other craftsmen deemed a fire hazard were evicted from Moscow proper onto the opposite, eastern bank of the Yauza (the present-day area of Taganka Square), thus beginning the industrialization of the river.

=== 17th and 18th centuries ===
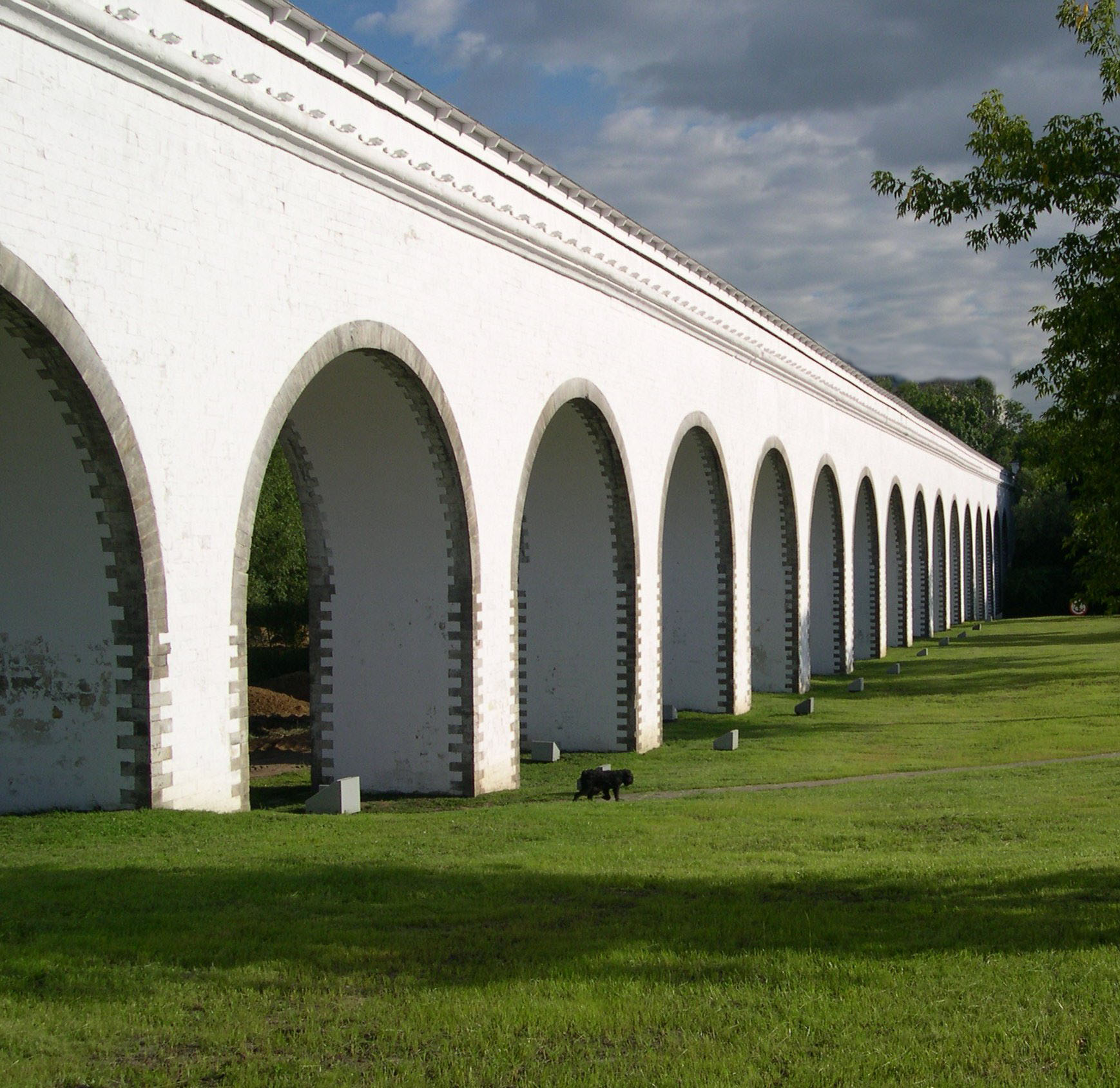
Rostokino Aqueduct crosses the Yauza north from Alekseyevskoye, former country residence of Tsar Alexis of Russia.

Slobodas (settlements) of metalworkers' guilds expanded, and in the 17th century Taganka became the most densely populated, remote area of the city of Moscow. The lower Yauza was used by numerous watermills and public baths tending to the growing population.

Suburban valleys of the Yauza also flourished under the early Romanovs. Tsar Mikhail of Russia (reigned 1613–1645) established his country palace in Rubtsovo (55°46′56″N 37°41′42″E) and his former rival Prince Dmitry Pozharsky (1577–1642) lived further out, in Medvedkovo on the Yauza (55°51′55″N 37°38′17″E). Alexis I of Russia (reigned 1645–1676) established a chain of country residencies in Preobrazhenskoye and Alekseevskoye (55°49′5″N 37°38′40″E) on the Yauza, and Izmaylovo Estate on its Serebryanka tributary. In 1653 Alexis yielded to the pressure of Orthodox clergy and expelled Catholics and Protestants from Moscow; they resettled in the German Quarter on the eastern bank of the Yauza, isolated from the city by the marshes around the Kokuy and Chechora streams.

Tsar Peter I (reigned 1682–1725) established his own headquarters in Preobrazhenskoye, and was a regular guest in the German Quarter. He neglected his father's palaces, instead concentrating on the military (Preobrazhensky Lifeguard regiment, established 1687) and supporting the industries spreading on both banks of the river. Bartolomeo Rastrelli erected Annenhof, a summer residence for empress Anna of Russia, in Lefortovo in 1731. Annenhof burnt down in 1746 and was eventually replaced by Catherine's Palace (55°45′42″N 37°41′44″E), designed by Giacomo Quarenghi; the palace now houses a military academy, and the former palace gardens have become a public park. Elizabeth of Russia built her country palace in Rubtsovo, on the site of Mikhail's former residence (55°46′56″N 37°41′42″E), from 1735 to 1743.

The Old Believers, a persecuted religious minority, were allowed to practice their beliefs in two isolated communities east of the Yauza (Rogozhskoye Cemetery and Preobrazhenskoye Cemetery) beginning in the 1770s. Edinoverie, a moderate branch of Old Believers in communion with the official Orthodox Church, built a large church complex on a high eastern bank of Yauza in Lefortovo (55°45′27″N 37°40′49″E).

In 1779 Catherine II authorized the construction of Moscow's first water-supply network. Water from underground aquifers in the upper Yauza basin flowed to downtown Moscow through underground pipes, surface canals and an aqueduct which crossed the Yauza valley in Rostokino. After numerous delays and setbacks, the system was commissioned in 1804 and operated into the 20th century; the city of Mytishchi continues to use Yauza aquifers.

=== Industrialization ===
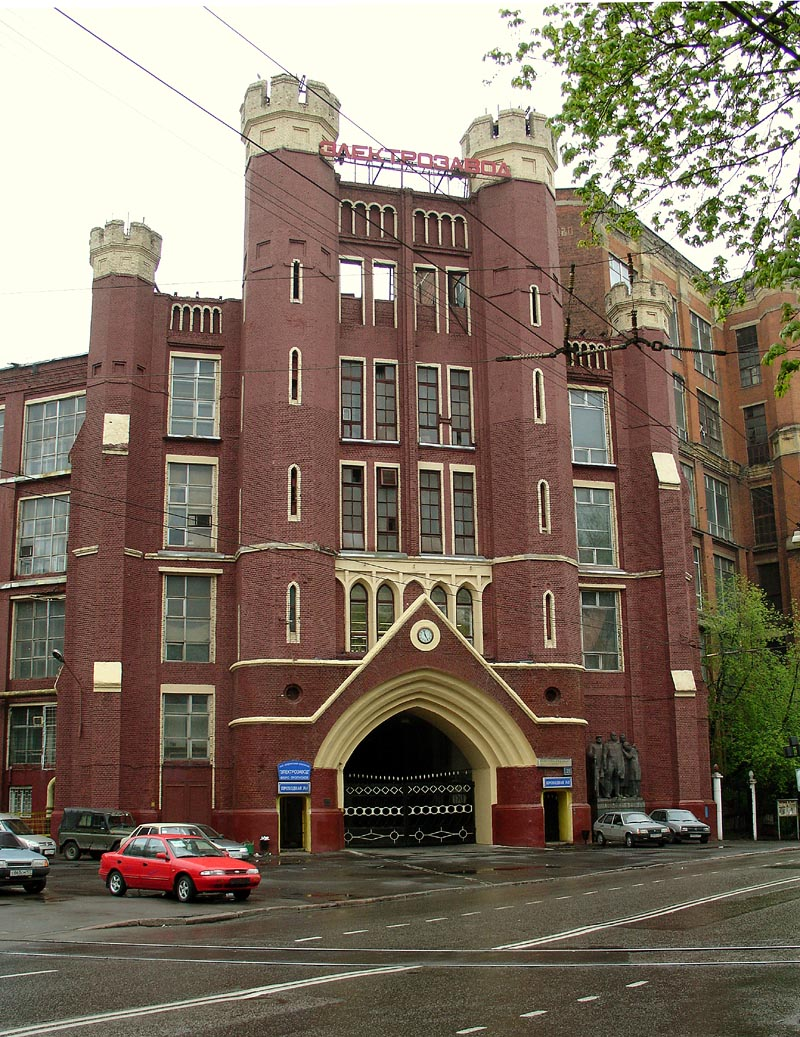
A neo-Gothic factory building on the Yauza in Preobrazhenskoye. Construction began during World War I to house equipment evacuated from Riga in anticipation of a German offensive.

State-run factories established by Peter I on the Yauza provided the seed for a chain of private factories; by the end of the 18th century significant industrial clusters emerged in Lefortovo and former German Quarter (then practically devoid of Western-European influence). In 1846, pollution from these mills prompted Moscow governor Aleksey Shcherbatov to survey the banks of the Yauza and enforce administrative action against the offenders.

Industrialization of the Yauza outside of the Garden Ring limits increased with the advent of railroads; within the Ring, the banks of the Yauza were the only heavily industrialized area. A major hub of three railway stations emerged north from the Yauza in the third quarter of the 19th century. The dense rail network helped establish the eastern perimeter of Moscow (Basmanny, Lefortovo, Rogozhskoye and Sokolniki) as "the fastest growing and the most variegated area, holding dozens of textile and garment factories but also machinery enterprises and Moscow's one steel mill."

The railroad infrastructure in Krasnoselsky District, a steady source of municipal revenue, was threatened by regular floods on numerous tributaries of the Yauza. This risk, along with the drive to free up land for development, led to the first modern flood control measures in the Yauza basin. Red Pond (55°45′37″N 37°40′36″E), connected to the Yauza by the Chechora River, was drained and converted to municipal rail yards in 1900–1911. During the same period, the Chechora was diverted into an underground sewer and the Yauza was spanned by new bridges.

Higher education along the Yauza goes back to the Imperial Technical College, established in 1830 and now known as Moscow State Technical University. The present college community around MSTU includes Moscow Power Engineering Institute, Moscow Technical University of Communications and Informatics, the Military University in Lefortovo, Moscow State University of Geodesy and Cartography, the State University Of Land Use Planning, Moscow State Pedagogical University and others in Basmanny District.

=== 20th century ===
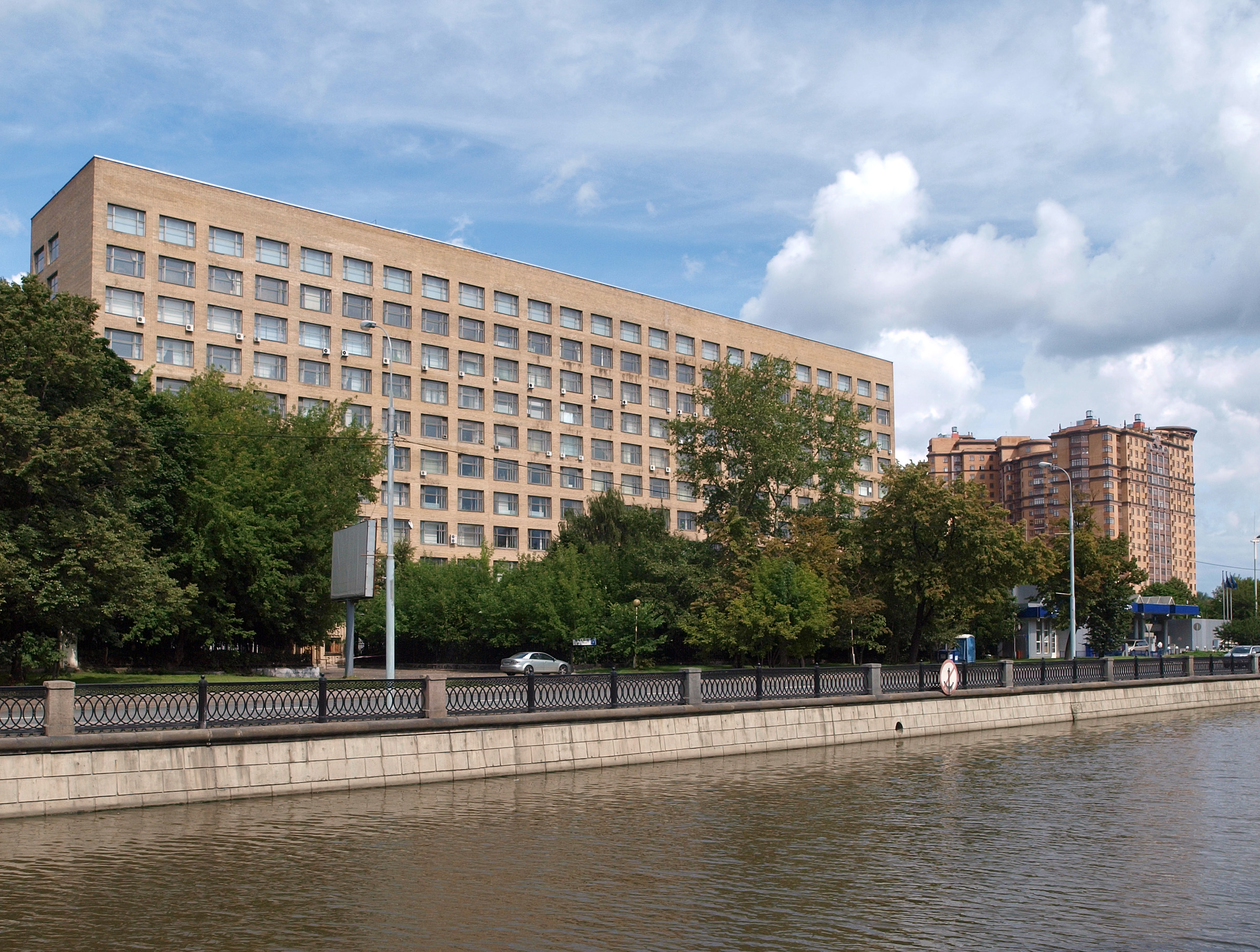
Tupolev headquarters in Basmanny District

TsAGI (the Central Aerohydrodynamic Institute), established in 1918 in the former German Quarter, (55°45′50″N 37°40′36″E) became a seed for one of two aircraft-industry clusters in Moscow. An aircraft-engine plant (the present-day NPO Salyut) was established on the opposite bank in 1926. Andrey Tupolev's design firm moved out of TsAGI into his own premises on the Yauza (55°45′37″N 37°40′36″E) in 1936; by 1945, the Tupolev staff reached 5,226. The postwar period added the Mil Moscow Helicopter Plant in Sokolniki and the Lyulka rocket-design bureau (now NPO Saturn) in Babushkinsky District.

Joseph Stalin's 1935 Moscow Reconstruction Plan called for the creation of an inner ring of navigable waterways in northern Moscow. The proposed Northern Shipping Canal (Russian: Северный судоходный канал) connectingKhimki Reservoir with the Yauza would have made the latter navigable up to Sviblovo; the Yauza valley north from Sviblovo would have been flooded into a broad reservoir. A system of four sets of locks would gradually reduce the water level; the river itself was to be deepened and widened into a navigable canal with granite embankments and broad, riverside highways. Further industrialization of the Yauza was prohibited; the embankments of the Moskva and the Yauza were zoned for high-profile public and residential buildings.

The Northern Canal, initially planned for completion in 1939, was never built; instead, the water level in the Yauza was reinforced through a low-cost water pipe connecting the Khimki Reservoir and the Likhoborka River (right-side tributary of the Yauza). A single set of locks (instead of four), designed by Georgy Golts, was built in 1940. The river was widened and flanked with embankments according to plan, albeit at a slower pace.

The social and zoning policies made in 1935 were soon discarded; industrialization of the Yauza drainage basin continued unchecked through the Soviet period, particularly in the "reviled south-east quadrant" not obstructed by park and forest reserves. The territory immediately east and southeast of the Yauza became "the city's worst rust and smokestack belt". The "problem child of the first Five Year Plan" continued to grow until the economic collapse of early 1990s, and the river itself became "a reeking porridge of raw wastes from eighty-two manufacturing plants."

In the 1990s manufacturing along the Yauza declined, and by 2009 many former industrial sites had been converted or rebuilt into offices and housing.

== Ecology ==
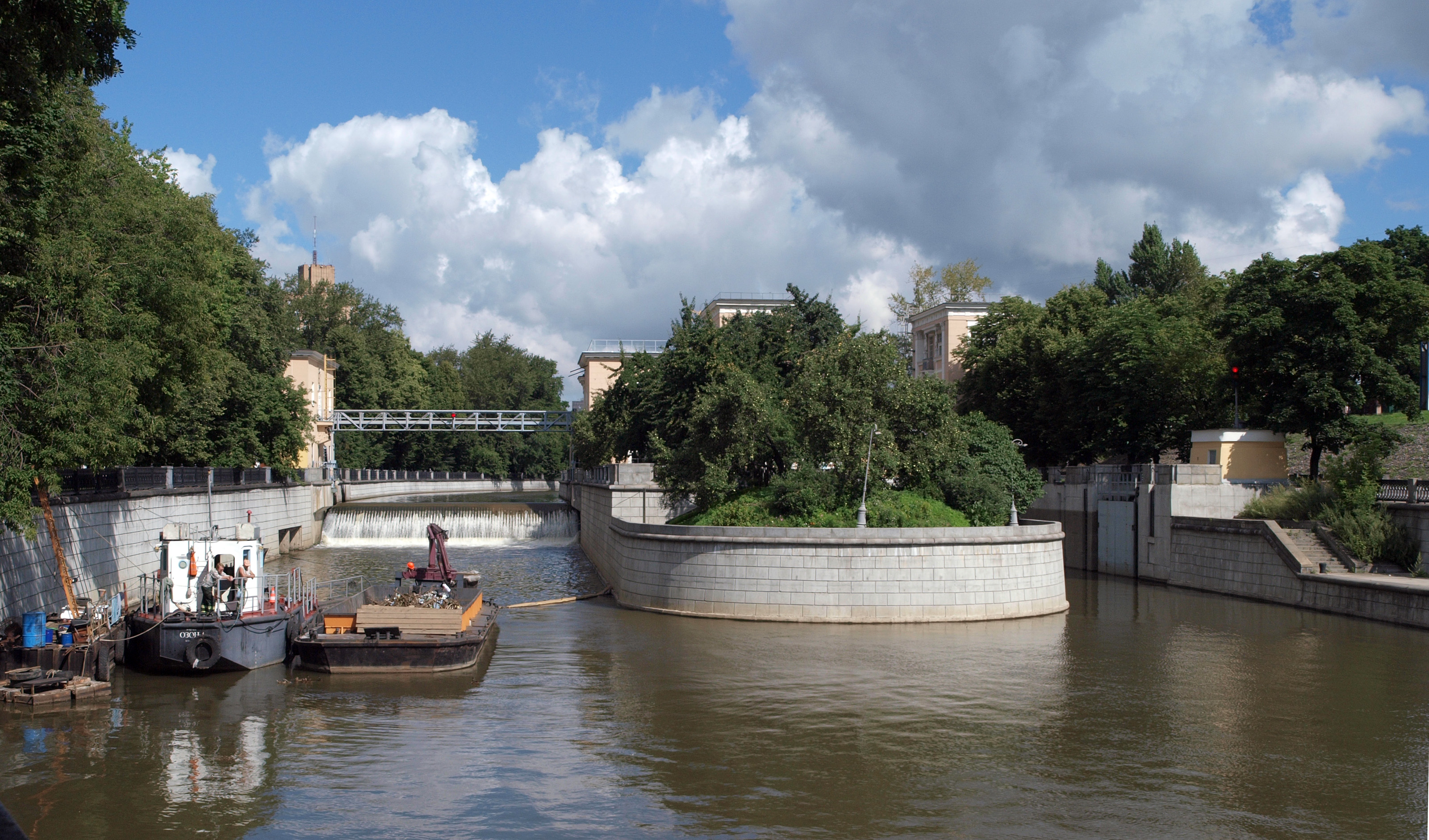
The Yauza reaches its maximum width of 65 meters three kilometers from its inlet, near the sluices south from the former German Quarter. A barge is filled with rubbish dredged from the river. Inflatable barrier visible on the surface traps the flotsam and directs it to the dredging boat on the left.

The industrialization of the Soviet period polluted the Yauza drainage basin to a point where "an oil-soaked tributary of Yauza burst into flame in 1971"; the Yauza itself "was called a river only by force of habit... the biggest gutter for waste in Moscow" and caused a prominent surge in Moskva River pollution below the Yauza inlet. By 2005 this surge disappeared, although pollution levels in the lower Yauza remained 2–3 times higher than in the Moskva just below the Yauza inlet.

Untreated filthy surface runoff was (as of 2008) the main source of pollution; in the 1980s it contributed one to eight times more petrochemical waste than direct industrial waste. As of 2008, nearly 80% of the surface runoff in the Central Administrative District is still flushed into the Moskva and Yauza untreated. Until 2000 the river was used in winter as a dump for snow collected from the streets, adding chlorides, soot, rubbish and more oil into the mix. This practice is now banned; the city now employs a network of snow-melting dumps that feed polluted water into treatment facilities.

Pollution levels gradually decreased in the 1990s and 2000s, as riverside factories were closed and converted (or completely rebuilt) into offices and housing; by 2008, industry contributed less than 10% of the city's waste water. The historical Kristall distillery (55°45′25″N 37°40′32″E) in Lefortovo remains the last major industrial pollutant on the Yauza.

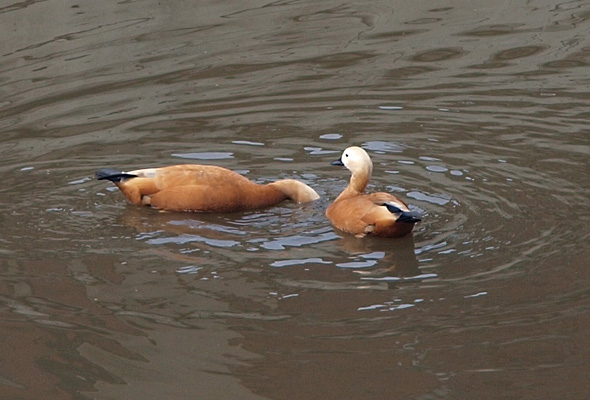
Ruddy shelducks on the Yauza, Lefortovo District

Between 2001 and 2007 the city drained the lower stretches of the Yauza, swept poisonous sediments off its bottom and plugged hundreds of illegal sewage outlets. The city commissioner's report for 2007 registered a significant decrease in pollution levels between 2006 and 2007 alone (a similar decrease was recorded in 2005), and reclassified Yauza water from "dirty" (pollution index of 4..6) to "polluted" (index just below 4), specifically mentioning high levels of iron and manganese.

In 2008, however, the trend reversed and pollution in the Yauza exceeded its 2006 levels. The petrochemical content in the Yauza was more than three times the national limit (2008: 0.93 mg/L vs. 0.3), suspended particles fivefold (2008: 56 mg/L vs. 10.25). Iron, manganese, formaldehyde, chemical oxygen demand and biochemical oxygen demand (BOD_{5}) also exceeded the maximum allowed limits. The Yauza tributaries (except the Ichka River) are still rated as either "dirty" or "very dirty" (pollution index 6..10). The city (as of 2008) planned the rehabilitation of the Yauza tributaries Chermyanka and Likhoborka, which was then threatened by shortage of funds in the wake of the 2008 Russian financial crisis.

The upper, cleaner stretch of the Yauza is home to about 20 species of fish, predominantly burbot, perch, crucian carp and gobio, but the lower Yauza also has a population of hardy fish. Perch caught near the Yauza inlet in the 1990s contained over 250 times the maximum allowed amount of petrochemical substances. The abundance of crucian carp became public in April 2008, when an accidental release of hot water from a power plant killed over a hundred fish near the Rostokino Aqueduct. Gobio albipinnatus, a fish that was believed to be extinct in the Moscow Oblast, was rediscovered in the Yauza and the Setun River in 1993.

== See also ==
Media related to Yauza River at Wikimedia Commons

- Rybenka

== Sources ==
- Alexander, John T. (2003). Bubonic plague in early modern Russia: public health and urban disaster. Oxford University Press US. ISBN 978-0-19-515818-2.
- Brooke, Caroline (2006). Moscow: a cultural history. Oxford University Press US. ISBN 978-0-19-530952-2.
- Colton, Timothy J. (1998). Moscow: Governing the Socialist Metropolis. Harvard University. ISBN 978-0-674-58749-6.
- Duffy, Paul (1996). Tupolev: the man and his aircraft. SAE. ISBN 978-1-56091-899-8.
- IUCN European Program (1995). Best practice for conservation planning in rural areas: biological and landscape diversity in Central and Eastern Europe. IUCN. ISBN 978-2-8317-0286-5.
- Koretsky, V. E. (September 2004). "A system for disposal of snow collected from city highways". Chemical and Petroleum Engineering. 40 (9–10). Springer (New York): 631. doi:10.1007/s10556-005-0022-9. S2CID 110658320.
- Moskva. Encyclopedia (Москва. Энциклопедия) (in Russian). Moscow: Bolshaya Rossiyskaya Encyclopedia. 1997. ISBN 978-5-85270-277-7.
- Kimstach, V. A; Meybeck, Michel; Baroudy, Elissar (1998). A water quality assessment of the former Soviet Union. Taylor & Francis. ISBN 978-0-419-23920-8.
- Pamyatniki arhitektury Moskvy. Bely Gorod (Памятники архитектуры Москвы. Белый город). Moscow: Iskusstvo. 1989.
- Pamyatniki arhitektury Moskvy. Zemlyanoy Gorod (Памятники архитектуры Москвы. Земляной город). Moscow: Iskusstvo. 1989. ISBN 978-5-210-00253-2.
- Orobey, O. N. (compilation), Lobov O. I. (editor) (2001). Stroiteli Rossii, XX vek. Moskva nachala veka (Строители России, ХХ век. Москва начала века) (in Russian). O-Master, Moscow. ISBN 978-5-9207-0001-8.
- Sokolov, L. I. (1998). "Ryby v usloviyah megapolisa (Рыбы в условиях мегаполиса)" (in Russian). Соросовский Образовательный Журнал (Soros Educational Journal).
- "State of environment in Moscow in 2008 (Доклад о состоянии окружающей среды в Москве в 2008 году)" (in Russian). Government of Moscow. 2009. Archived from the original on 2009-08-03.
- "State of environment in Moscow in 2007 (Доклад о состоянии окружающей среды в Москве в 2007 году)" (PDF) (in Russian). Government of Moscow. 2008. Archived from the original (PDF) on 2011-10-08. ISBN 978-5-901887-02-8
- "State of environment in Moscow in 2006 (Доклад о состоянии окружающей среды в Москве в 2006 году)" (PDF) (in Russian). Government of Moscow. 2007. Archived from the original (PDF) on 2011-10-08.
- "State of environment in Moscow in 2000–2001 (Доклад о состоянии окружающей среды в Москве в 2000–2001 годах)" (in Russian). Government of Moscow. 2002.
- Surikova, Elena (2000). "Losiny Ostrov (in Russian)". Russian Academy of Sciences. Center for ecology and forestry. Archived from the original on 2018-04-12.
- Sytin, P. V. (1948). Iz istorii moskovskih ulits (Из истории московских улиц) (in Russian). Moskovsky Rabochy.
- Nasimovich, Yuri. "Nature of Lefortovo (in Russian)". Zhurnal Temnyj Les.
