= German Quarter =

Neighborhood of historical district of Moscow

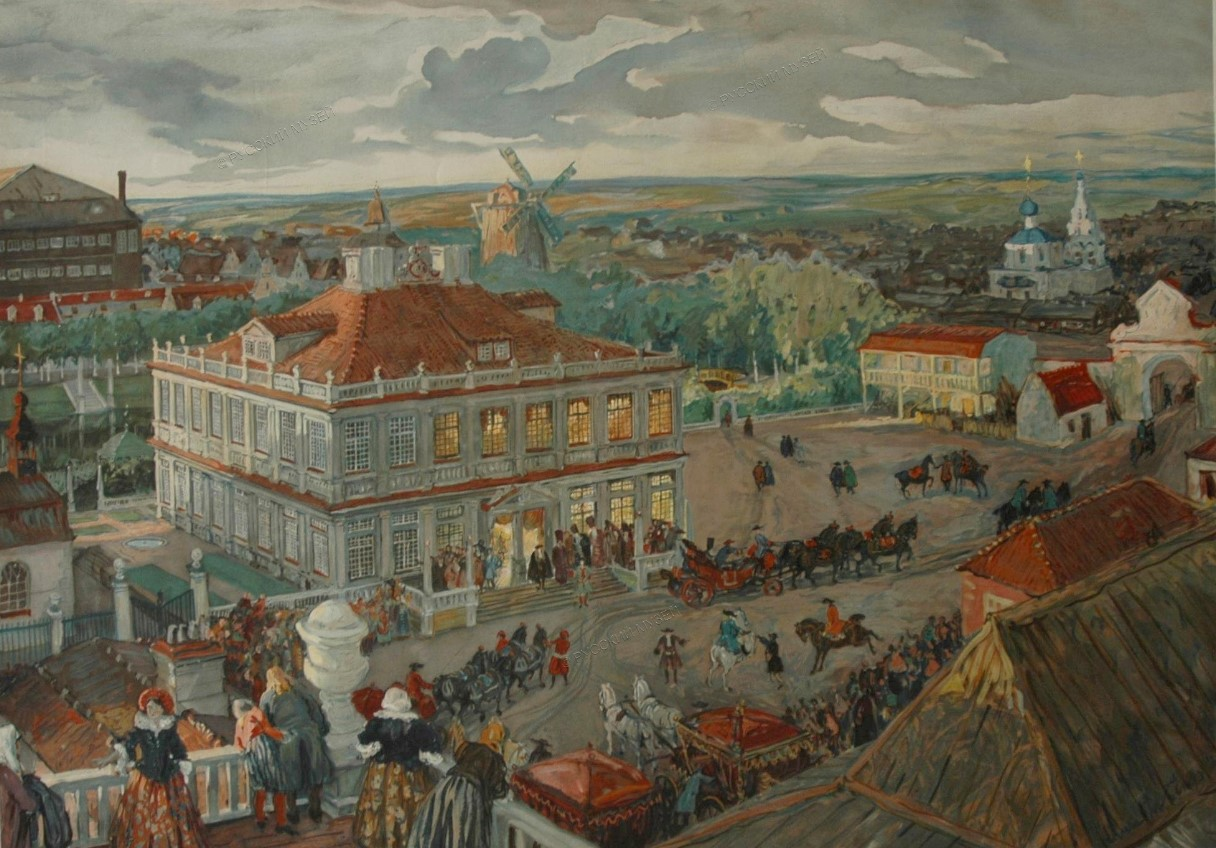
At the German Quarter by Alexandre Benois (1911)

The German Quarter (Russian: Немецкая слобода, romanized: Nemetskaya sloboda), also known as the Kukuy Quarter (Кукуйская слобода), was a neighbourhood in the northeast of Moscow, located on the right bank of the Yauza River east of the former Kukuy Creek (hence the name Kukuy Quarter), within the present-day Basmanny District of Moscow.

Its boundaries were defined by present-day Dobroslobodskaya Street and Bolshoy Demidovsky Lane (west, following the track of Kukuy creek), Spartakovskaya Street (north), and the Yauza River (south and east). Kukuy formed a wide pond west of present-day Elizavetinsky lane, on the site of the present-day Sokol stadium of Moscow State Technical University, which occupies the southern half of a former German settlement.

== Old German Quarter ==
"German" Quarters developed in Moscow in the 16th century and were populated by foreigners from Western Europe (collectively called "Germans" by the Russian people (the Russian word for "German", Russian: немец, romanized: nemets, relates to the Russian word for "mute", Russian: немой, romanized: nemoy]) and by prisoners taken during the Livonian War of 1558-1583.

The residents of the Old German Quarter mainly engaged in handicrafts and flour milling (whence the flour mills on the Yauza River). In the early 17th century, the army of False Dmitri II (self-proclaimed Tsar, 1607-1610) ravaged the Old German Quarter. It did not immediately recover, since many residents relocated closer to the Moscow Kremlin or fled the country.

== New German Quarter ==
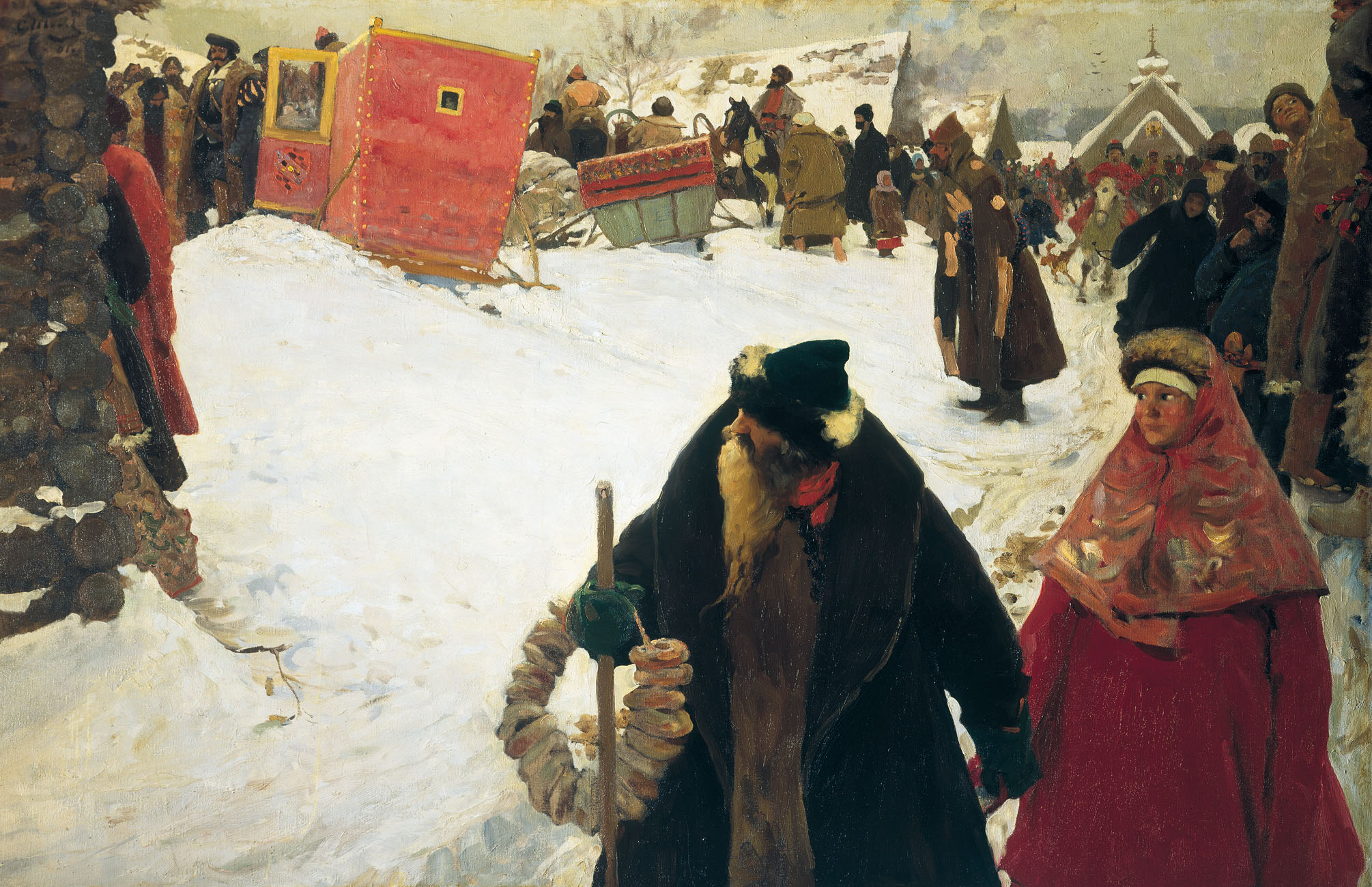
Muscovites tended to treat foreigners living at the German quarter with suspicion

After the end of Time of Troubles, downtown Moscow attracted many European settlers, serving the royal court and the numerous foreign soldiers of muscovite troops. In the 1640s, however, the clergy persuaded the tsar to limit foreign presence in Moscow, and in 1652 Alexis I of Russia forced all Catholic and Protestant foreigners to relocate to the German Quarter, which became known as the New German Quarter (Novonemetskaya Sloboda), located east of present-day Lefortovskaya Square, above the mouth of the Chechera River. By 1672, it had three Lutheran and two Calvinist churches and numerous factories, like Moscow's first Silk Manufactory, owned by A. Paulsen. In 1701, J.G. Gregory, based in the German Quarter, obtained a monopoly patent for a public pharmacy (hence, the name of Aptekarsky (Pharmacy) Lane).

The quarter was populated by merchants, store owners, and foreign officers of the Russian army. Among them were future associates of Peter the Great, such as Patrick Gordon and Franz Lefort, or Peter the Great (who grew up nearby, on the eastern bank of Yauza) was a frequent guest in the German Quarter, and he met his mistress Anna Mons there. Deceased residents were buried at the Vvedenskoye Cemetery, also known as German Cemetery, located across Yauza in Lefortovo; this tradition persisted among Lutherans and Catholics until the 20th century.

In the early 18th century, the usual way of life in the German Quarter started to change. Its territory gradually turned into a construction site for palaces of the nobles, notably Lefort and later Alexander Bezborodko (in the 1830s, these palaces became the site of Moscow State Technical University). At the same time, foreigners, not bound by former restrictions, migrated to the center of Moscow, for example, the French community settled in Kuznetsky Most.

== End of "German" presence ==
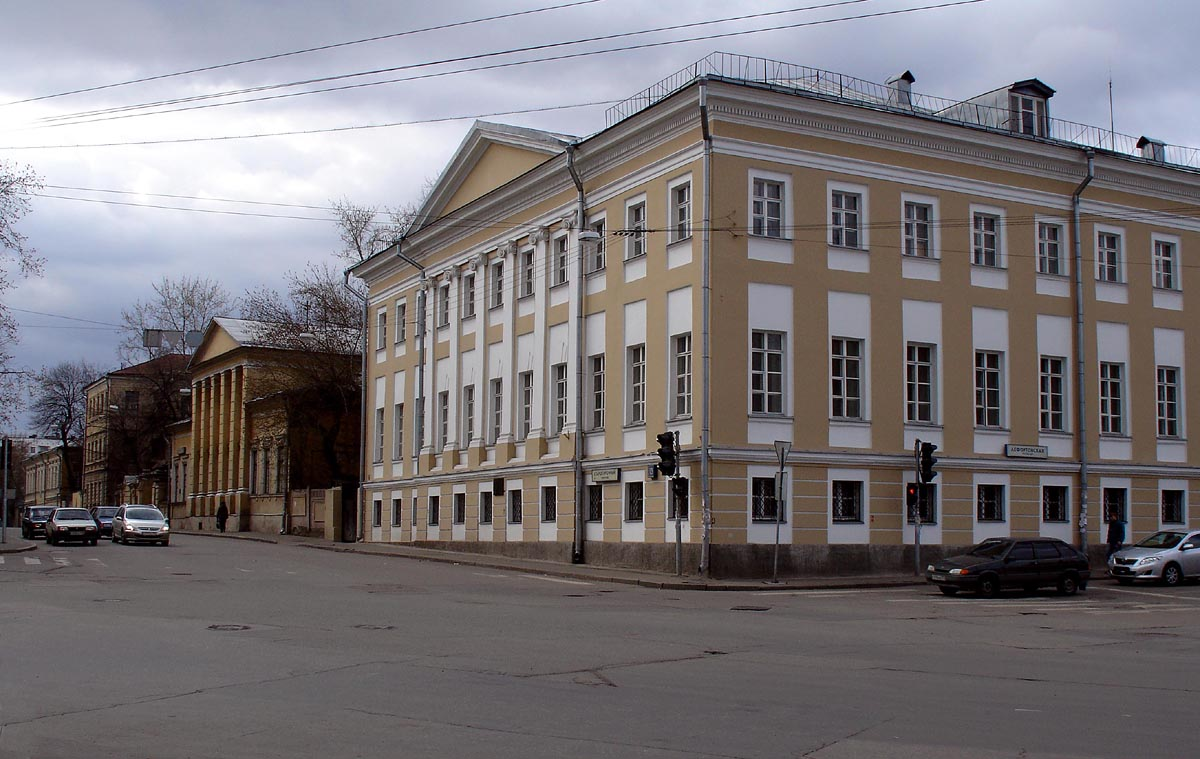
Lefortovskaya Square, post-1812 buildings

Throughout the 18th century, Russian merchants took over the German businesses and established their own; the shores of Yauza housed P.Belavin's silk factory, N.Ivanov's ribbon factory, etc.

The fire of 1812 razed the area, and the ruined owners preferred to sell their lands to new owners. By 1826, all foreign landlords sold their land to local merchants and craftsmen; the German Quarter lost its ethnic flavor but retained the name of Nemetskaya (German) Street (Baumanskaya Street since 1918). Lutheran churches were never rebuilt; Moscow's Lutheran Cathedral was erected nearly 100 years after the fire in the central Basmanny District. The name "German Quarter" itself disappeared from the Moscow lexicon in the mid-19th century.

== See also ==
- Vvedenskoye Cemetery
- George Hüfner
