= Soviet architectural modernism =

Architectural style

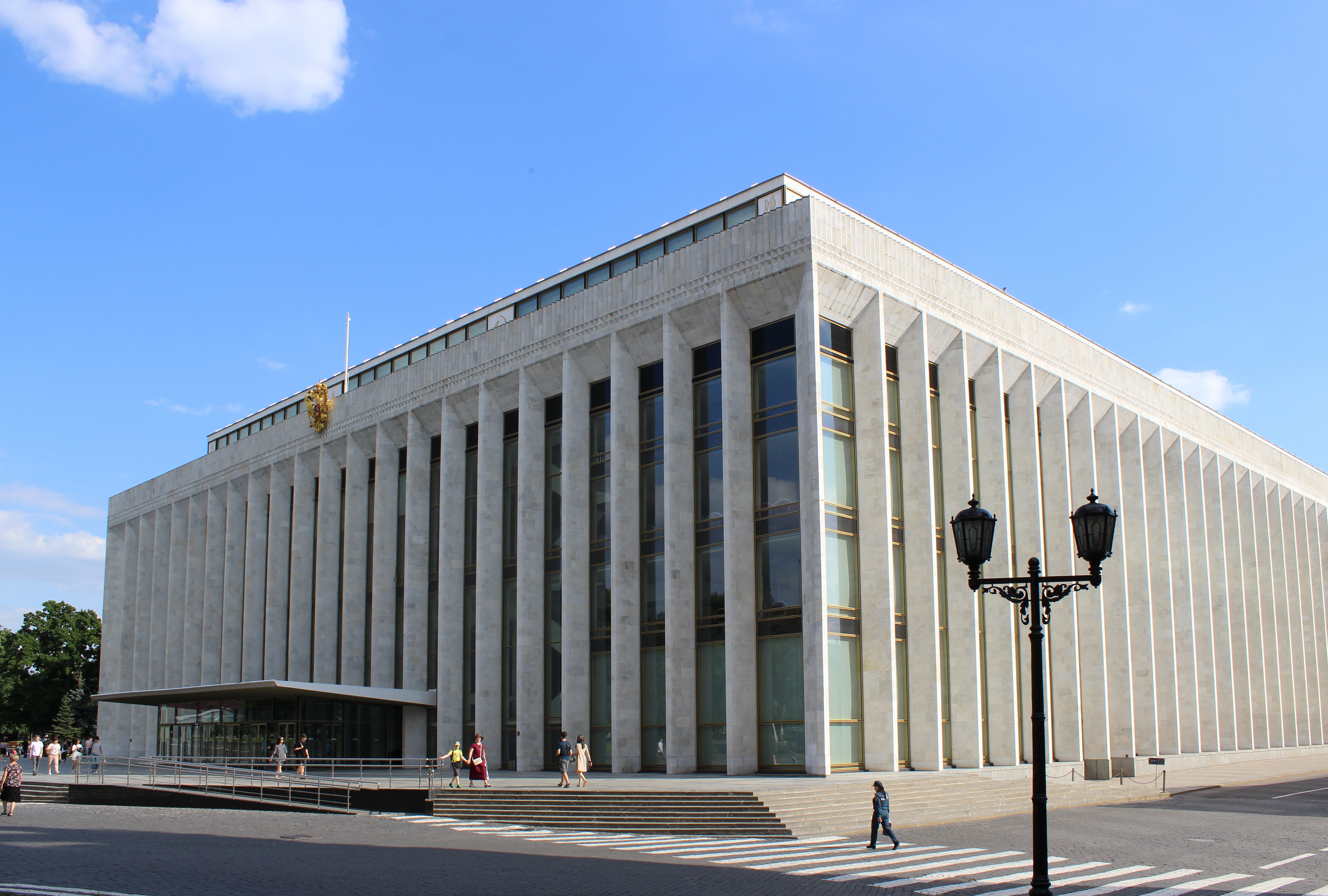
Kremlin Palace of Congresses

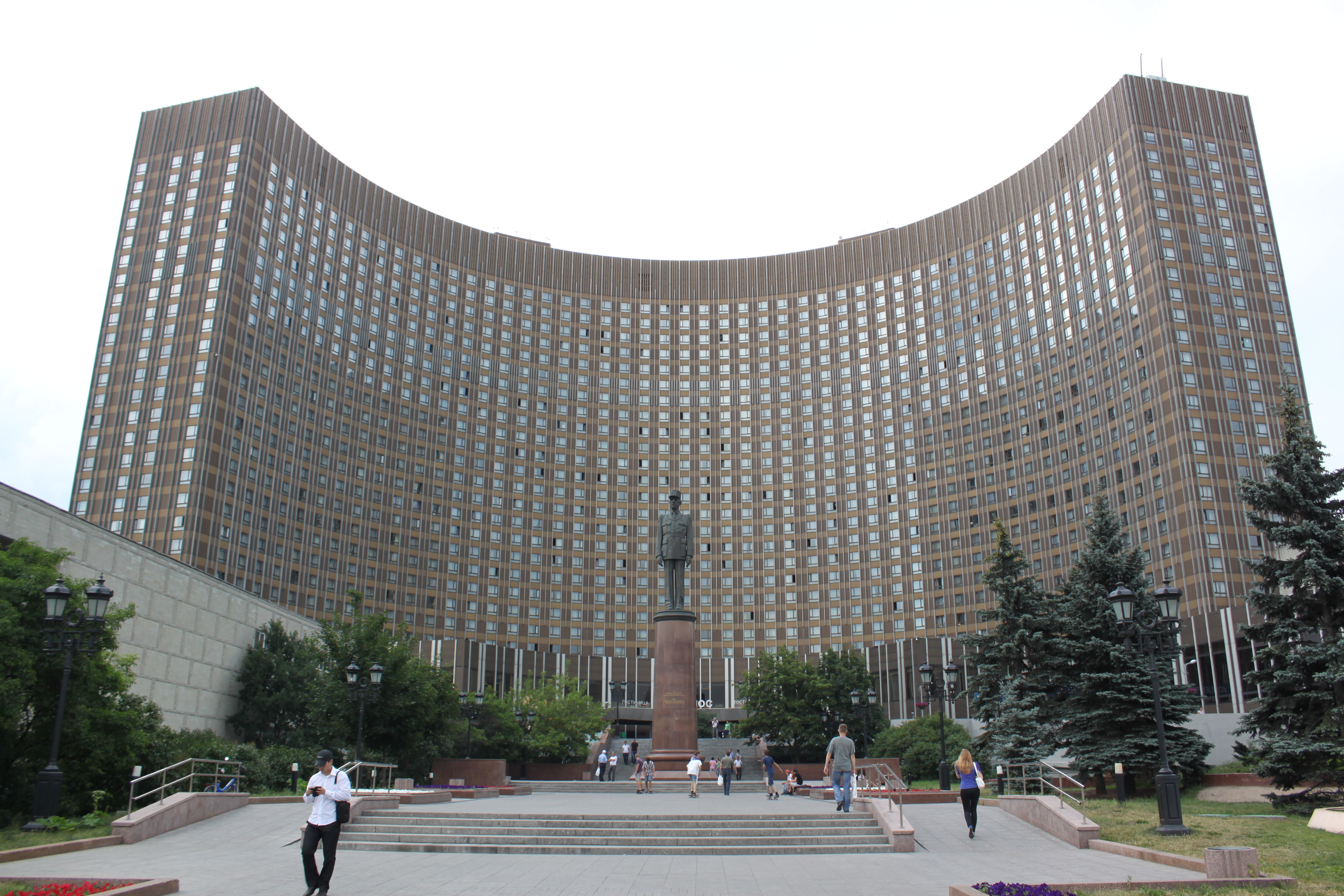
Cosmos Hotel in Moscow

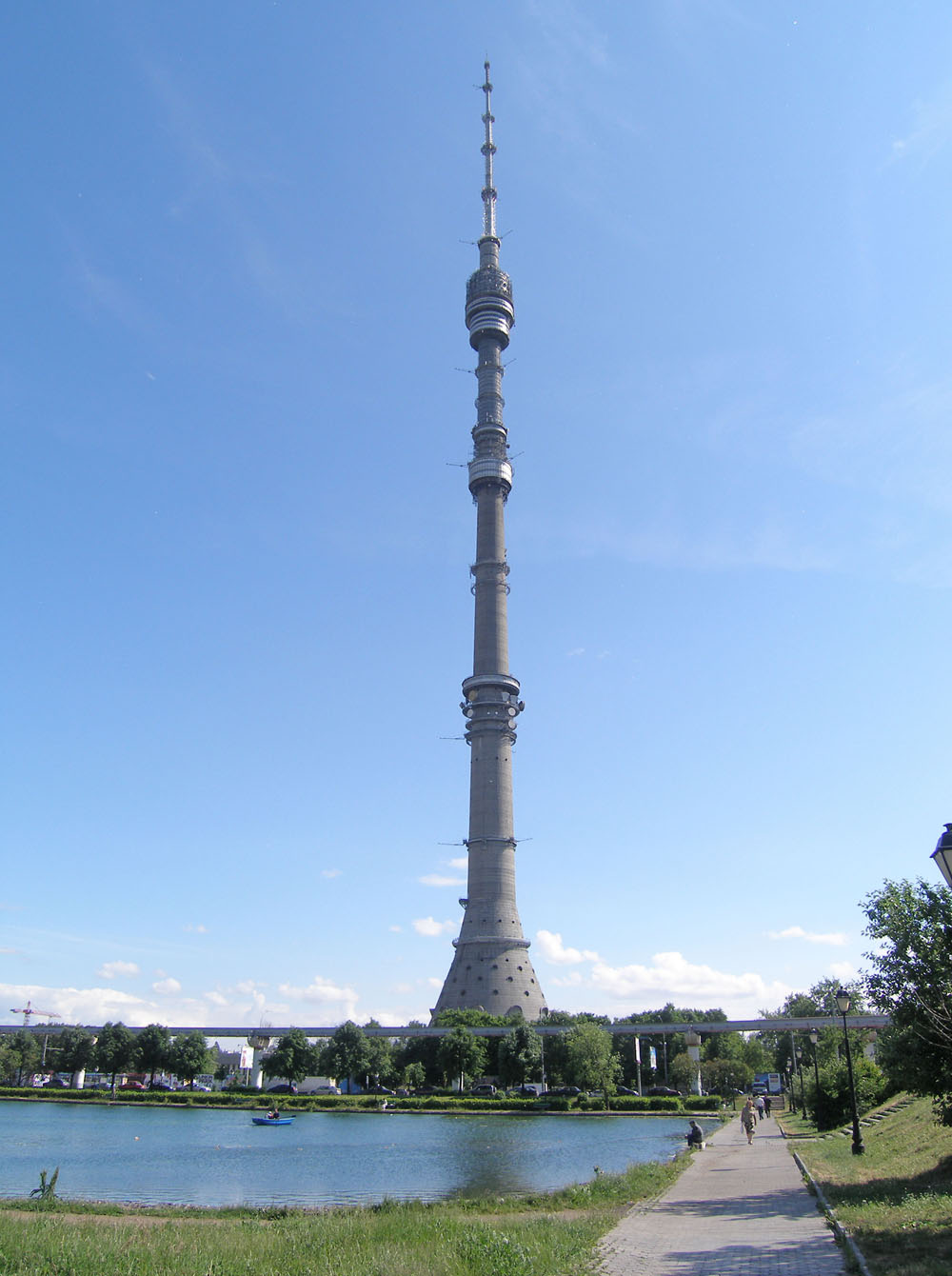
Ostankino Tower

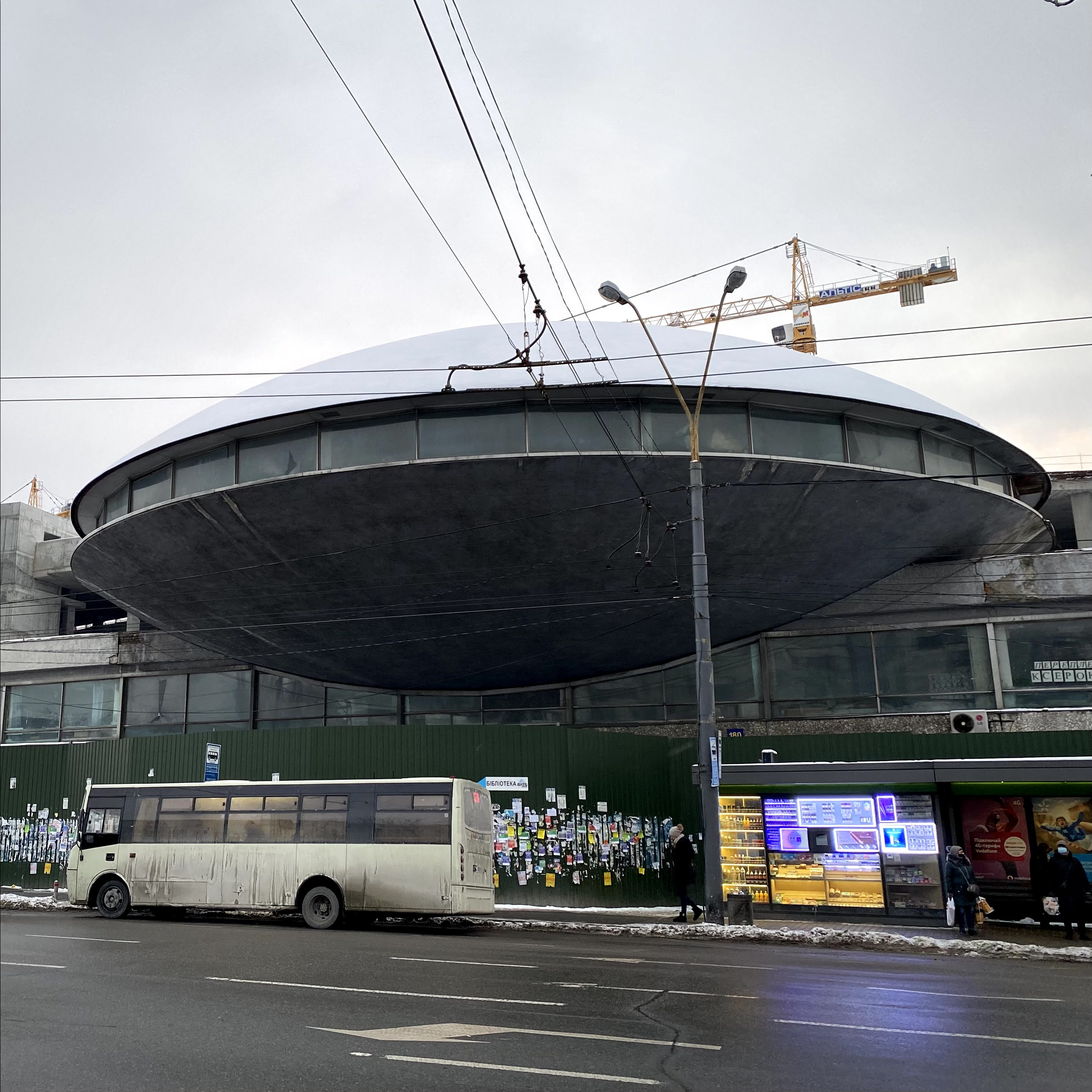
"Flying Saucer" building in Kyiv

Soviet architectural modernism was one of the three main architectural trends of the Soviet Union, along with Soviet avant-garde architecture and Stalinist Empire style. Critics identified it in the early 21st century as a separate direction. It covered the period from 1955 to 1991. The transition to modernism began with the resolution of the CPSU Central Committee and the Council of Ministers of the USSR of 4 November 1955, "On the Elimination of Excesses in Design and Construction".

== General characteristics ==
=== Origins ===
Architectural modernism came to the USSR from the West and transformed into a Soviet form. During the so-called Khrushchev Thaw, specialized professional journals became openly accessible to Soviet architects, and exchanges of experience began with architects from Poland, Cuba, and Hungary. The international character of modernism was, in fact, one of its main distinguishing features.

More specifically, the origins of Soviet modernism lay directly in the works of Le Corbusier, who by the 1950s had reworked the foundations of Soviet constructivism into a new, personal architectural style.

=== History of the term ===
The term "Soviet architectural modernism" was introduced in the early 2010s. Before that, it essentially did not exist. There are still no precise criteria defined for Soviet architectural modernism, other than the relatively clear chronological period.

A significant role in identifying this style was played by French photographer Frédéric Chaubin, who, in the early 2000s, traveled through the former Soviet Union and documented a number of buildings, which at that time were considered exclusively examples of brutalism.

=== Soviet architectural modernism and brutalism ===
According to many researchers, Brutalism formed the basis of Soviet modernism.

For Soviet modernism, as well as for brutalism, functionality of massive forms and constructions was characteristic, as well as the urban appearance of buildings. Compositional solutions were probably intended to reflect the scope of advanced ideas and the anti-bourgeois principles of Soviet life. As in brutalism, the main building material of Soviet modernism was reinforced concrete, and the approach to architectural commissions was comprehensive.

=== Stylistic features ===
It would, however, be incorrect to fully equate this architectural style with brutalism, since there were differences. For example, a feature of Soviet modernism was the use of facing materials (marble, sandstone, shell limestone, ceramics, and others).

Another characteristic of this style (especially in its developmental stage) was decorativeness—for instance, mosaic panels, bas-reliefs, and other modernist decorative elements of monumental art. Mass glazing of building surfaces was also typical, partly reminiscent of constructivism.

== Research ==
A significant role in defining the style was played by the study (in fact, a photo album) of French photographer Frédéric Chaubin, as well as the photo series "Spomenik" by Belgian photographer Jan Kempenaers. Similarly, the typology of Soviet bus stops was brought to international attention through the documentation work of Canadian photographer Christopher Herwig.

In this context, attention should also be given to the study of architect Felix Novikov, published by Tatlin Publishing under the title "Soviet Modernism: 1955–1985," as well as the work on the creativity of Armenian architects "Architecture of Soviet Modernism."

== Main examples of the style ==
Examples of Soviet modernism include the following buildings: Great Moscow State Circus, Pavilion No. 70 "Moscow" at VDNH, Moscow Palace of Pioneers, the State Kremlin Palace, the ensemble of Victory Park on Poklonnaya Hill, Ostankino Tower, the residential district Chertanovo Severnoye, the AZLK Museum building, the Central Wedding Palace, and the branch of the Central Museum of V. I. Lenin in Kyiv, among others. In July 2026, UNESCO designated ten sites belonging to the Soviet modernist style in Tashkent as a World Heritage Site.

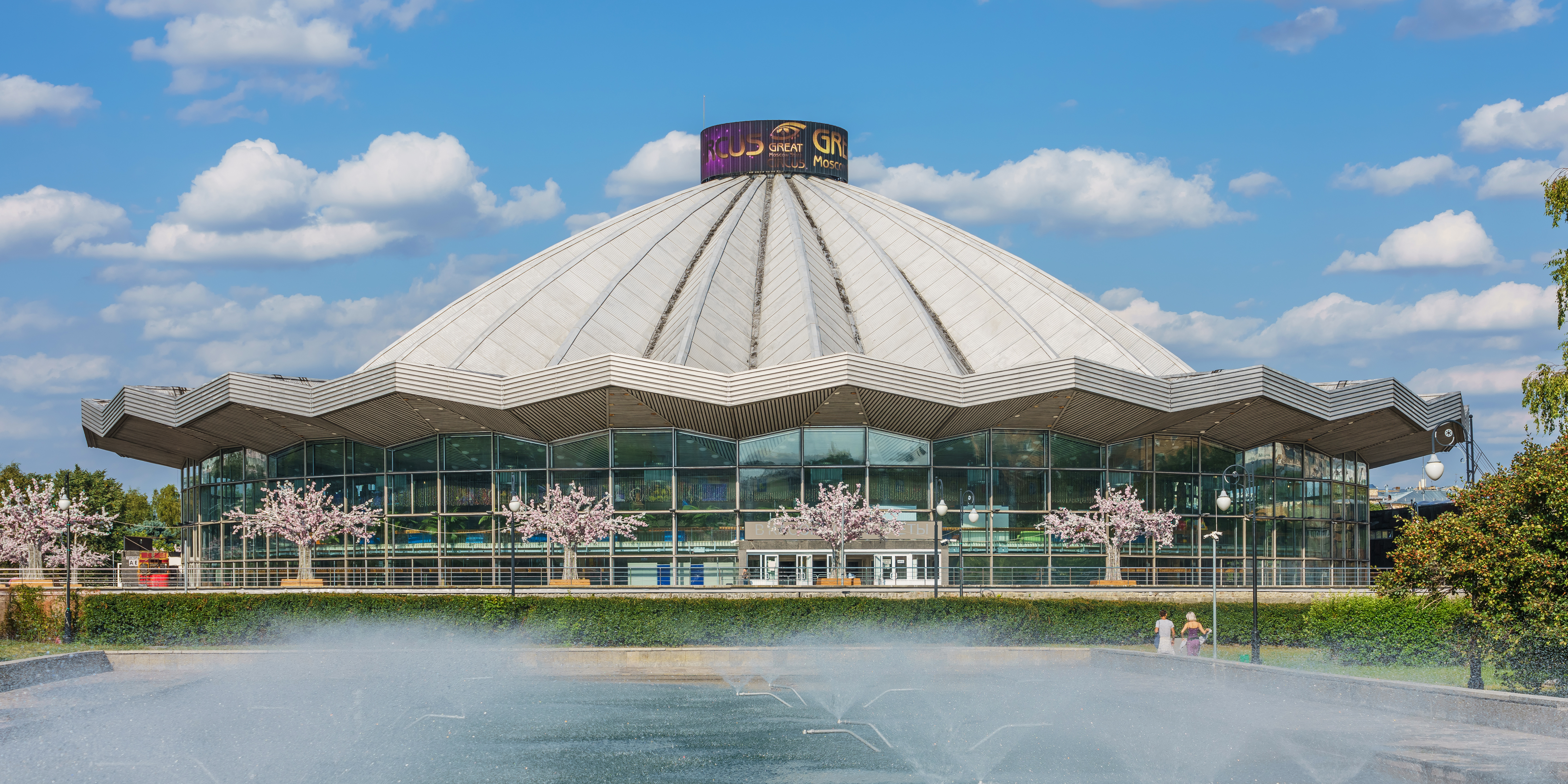
Great Moscow State Circus. Architects: E. Vulikh and L. Misozhnikov, consultants Ya. Belopolsky and N. Kancheli

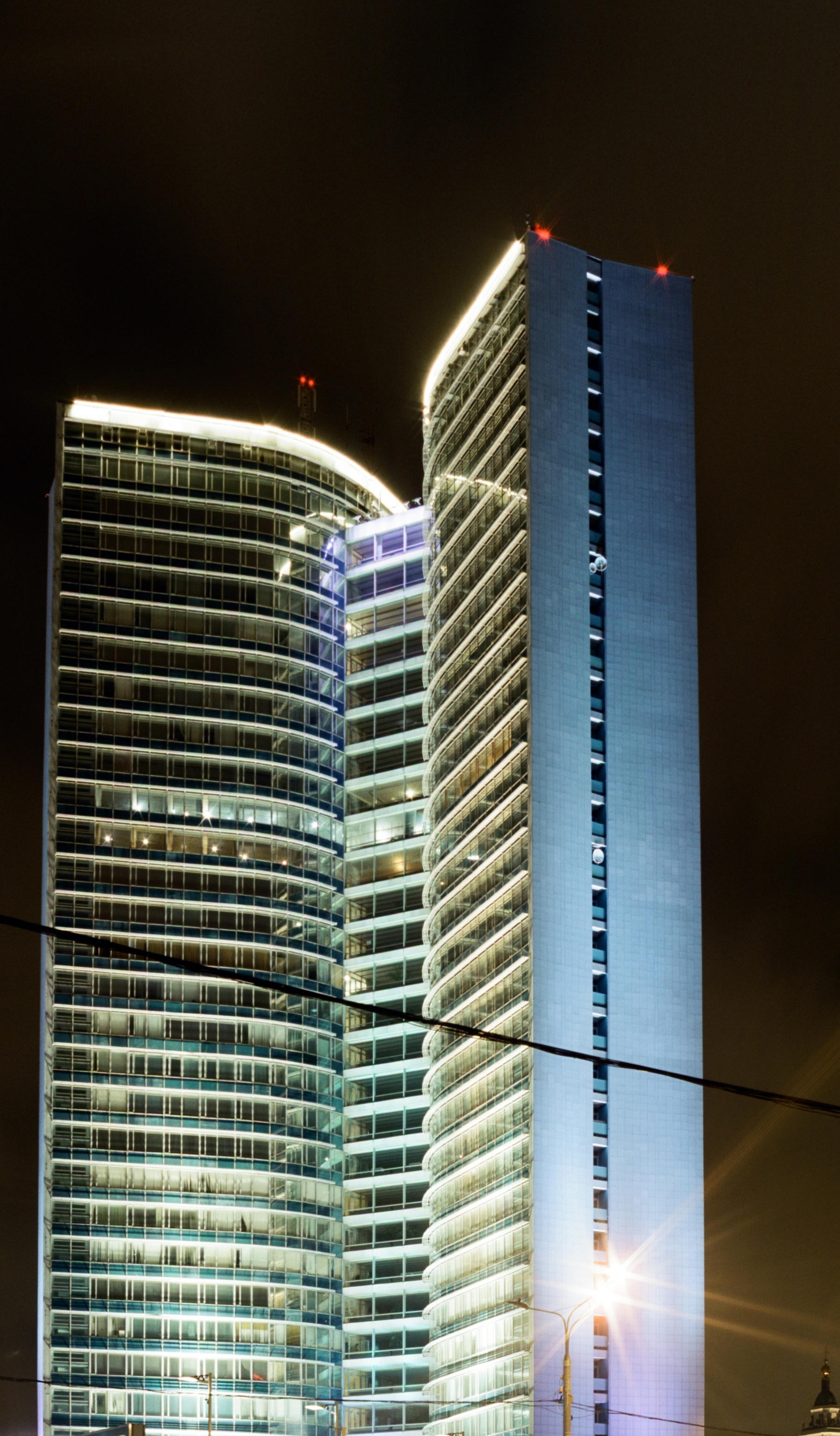
Comecon "Book". Architects M. V. Posokhin, A. A. Mndoyants

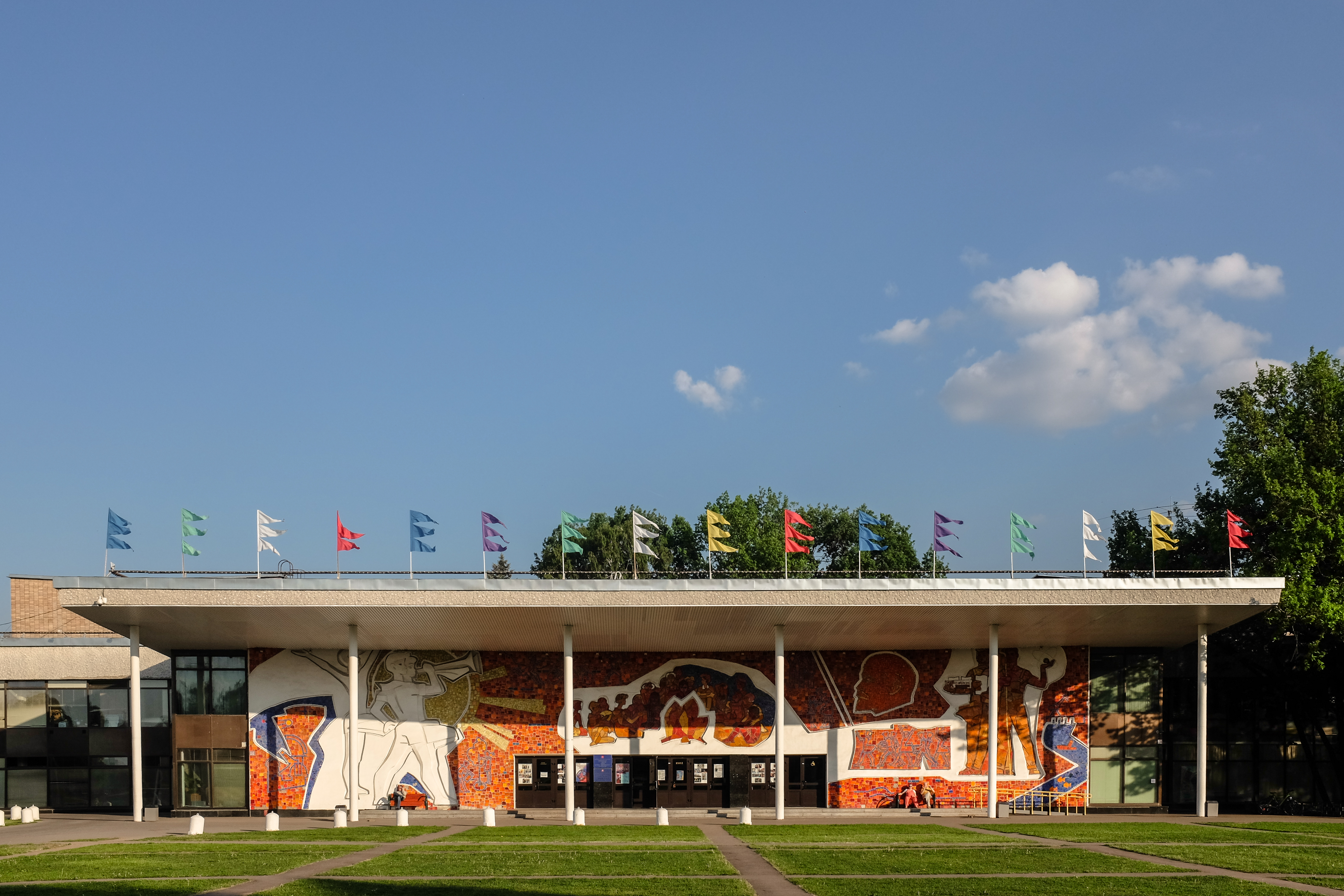
Moscow Palace of Pioneers

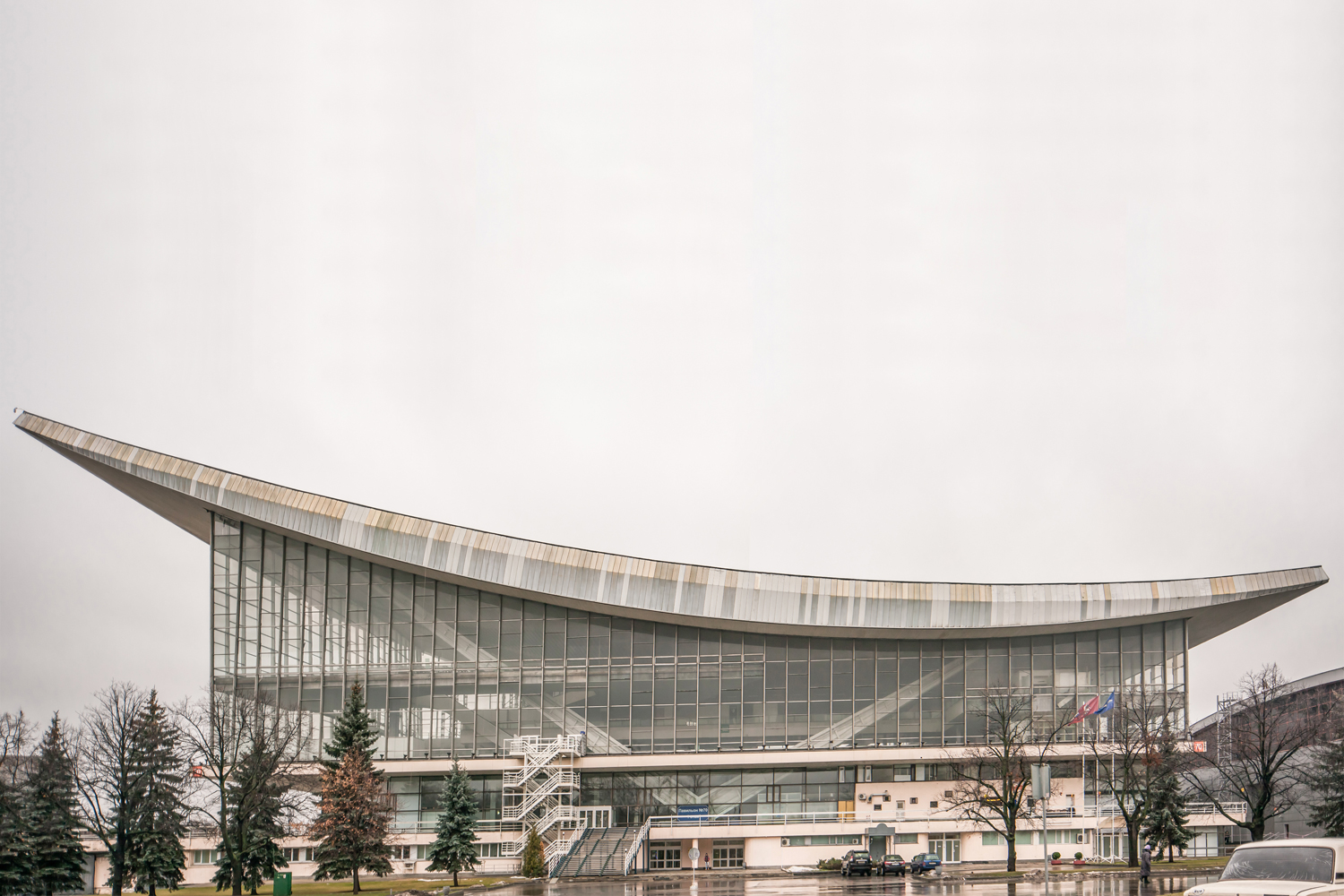
Pavilion No. 70 "Moscow" at VDNH. Architects M. V. Posokhin, A. A. Mndoyants, B. Tkhor

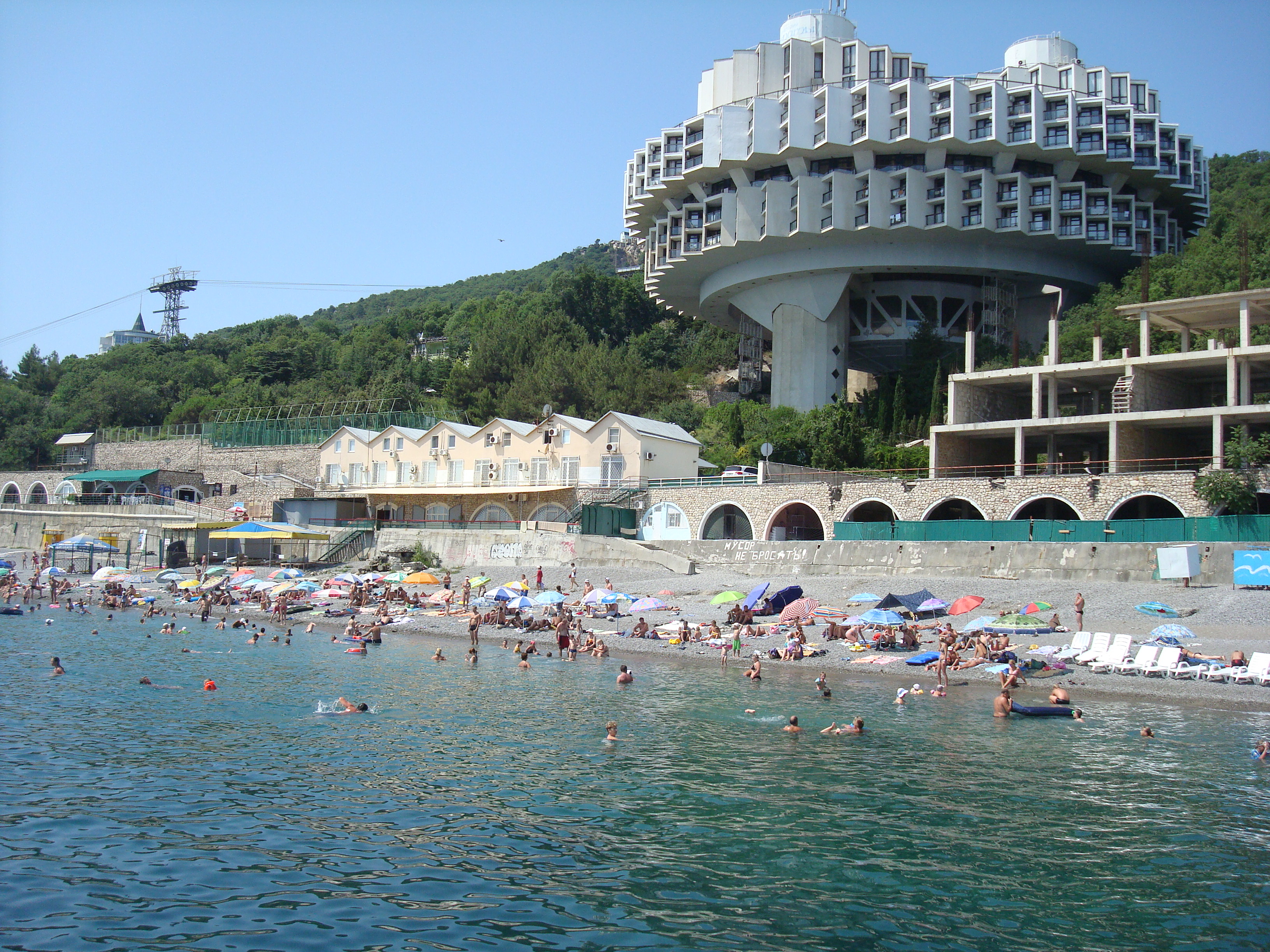
Druzhba Sanatorium, Yalta. Architect: I. Vasilevsky

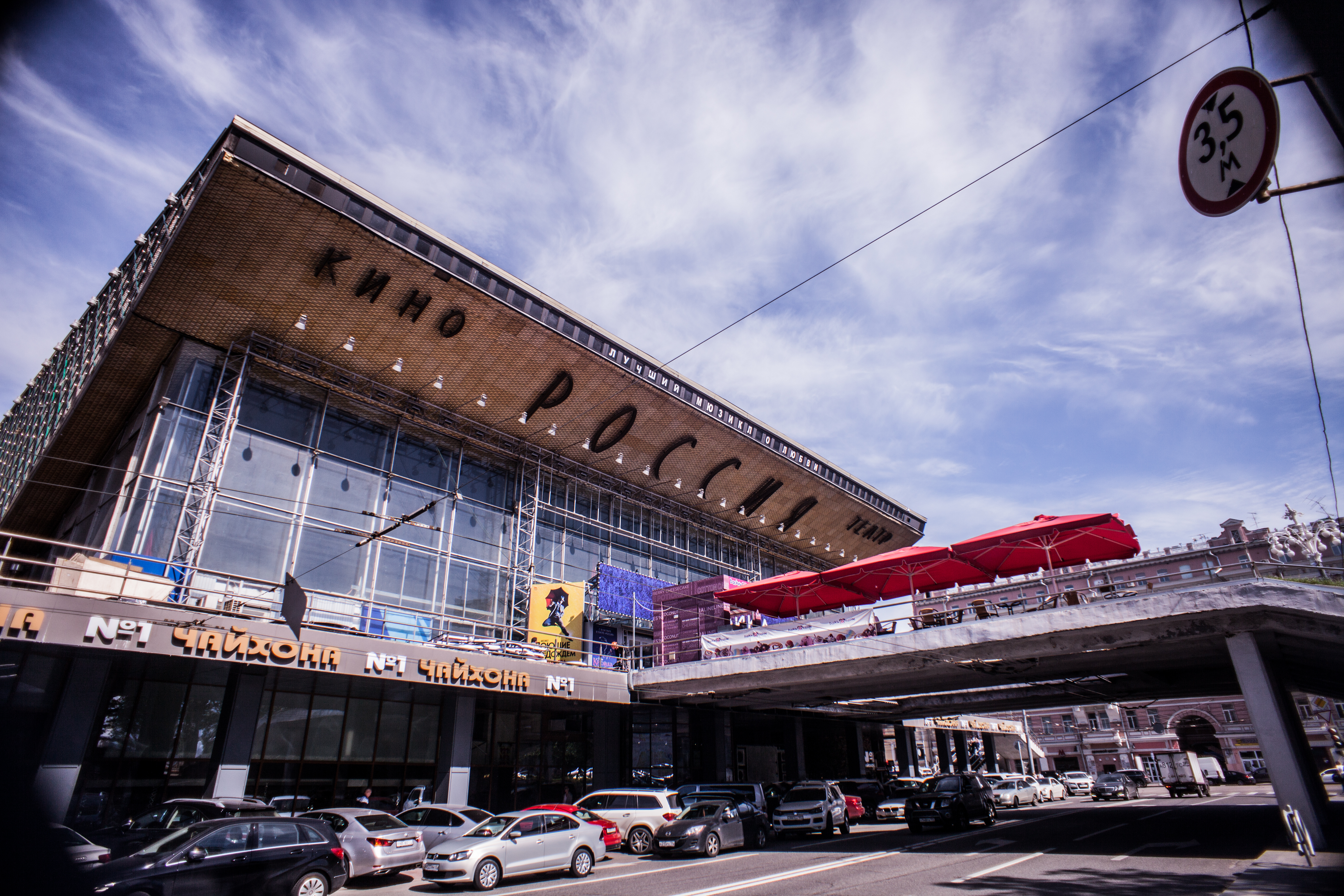
Rossiya Cinema

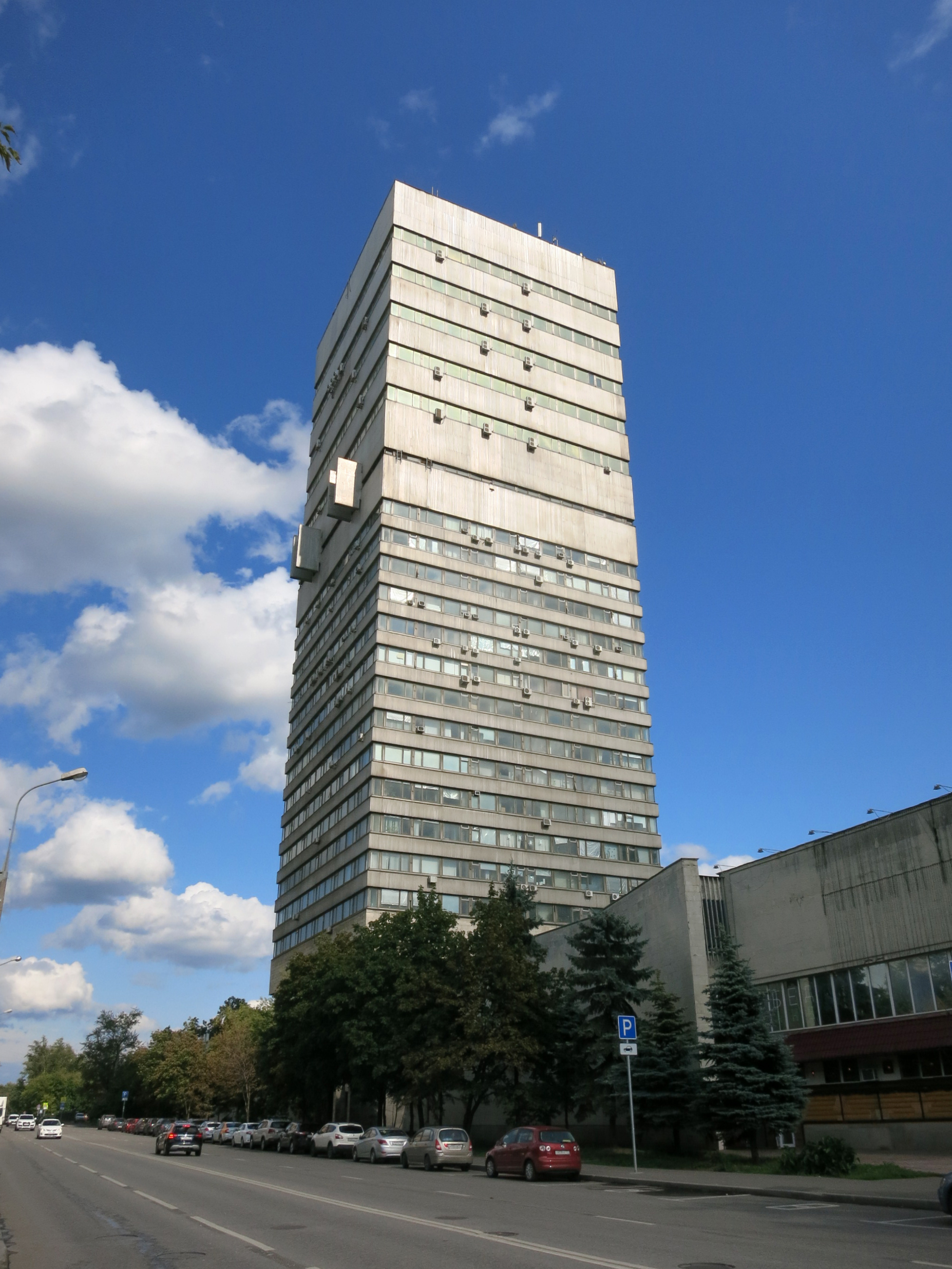
Rosstat Tower, Izmaylovskoye Highway, 44

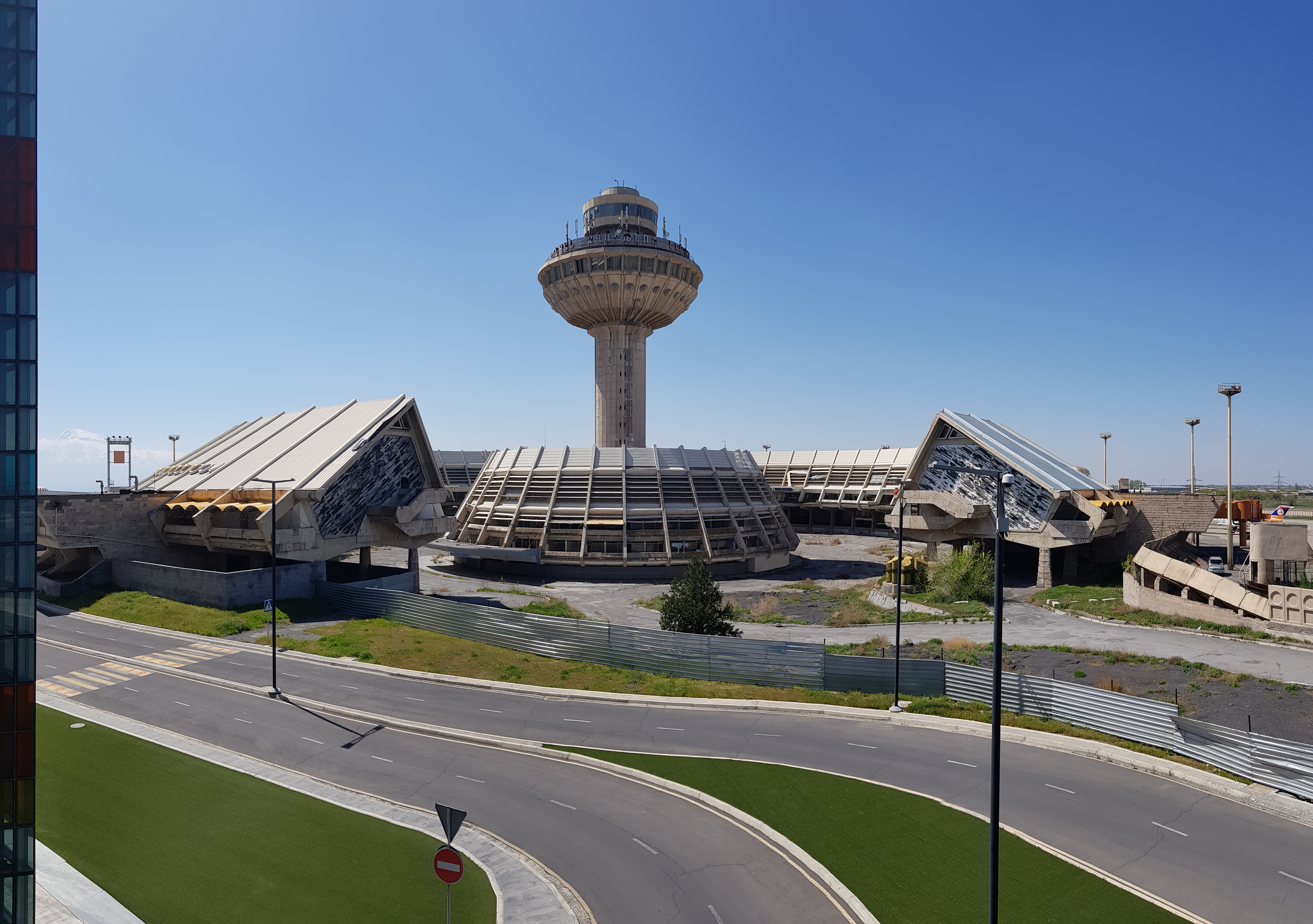
Zvartnots International Airport

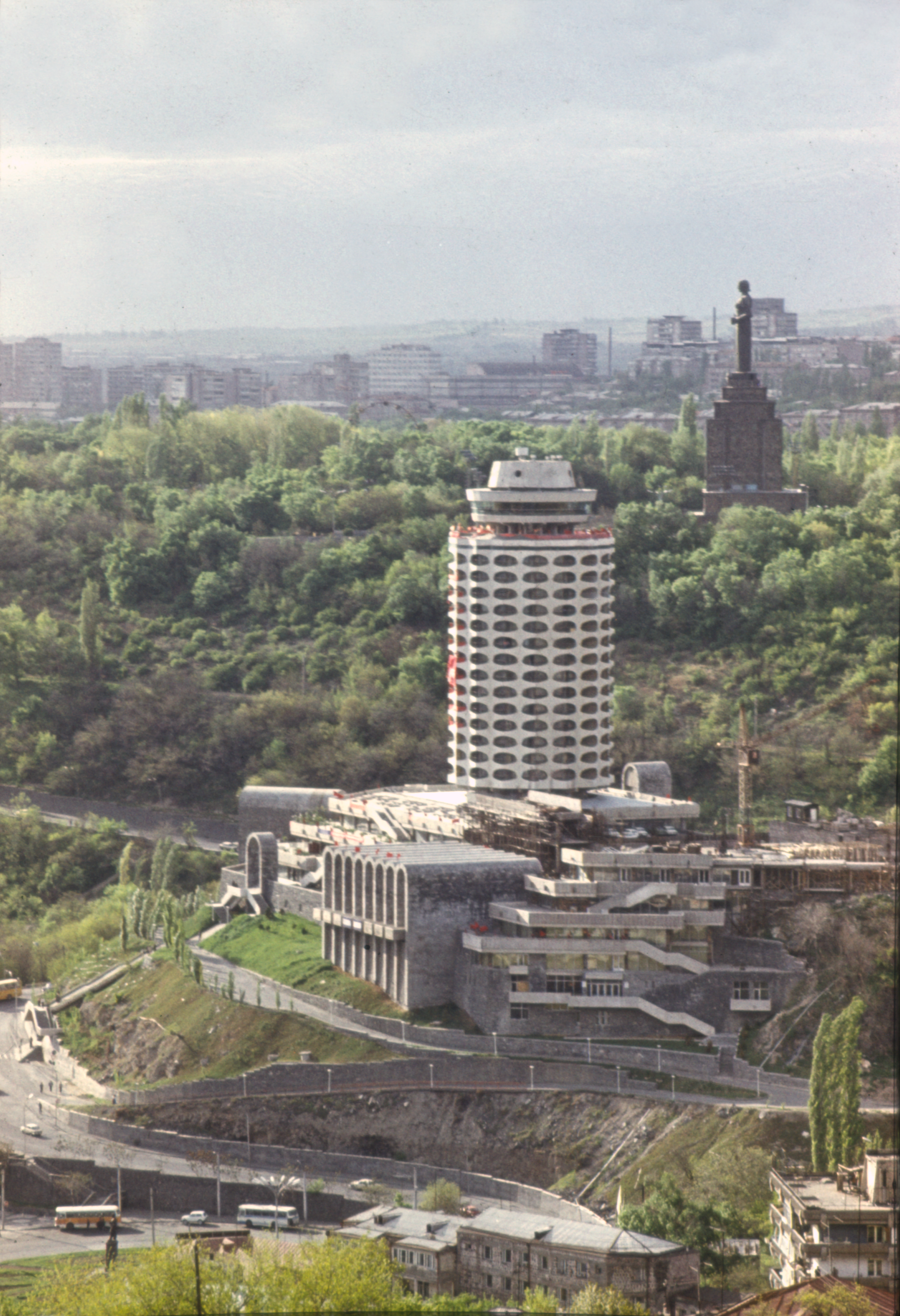
Yerevan Youth Palace

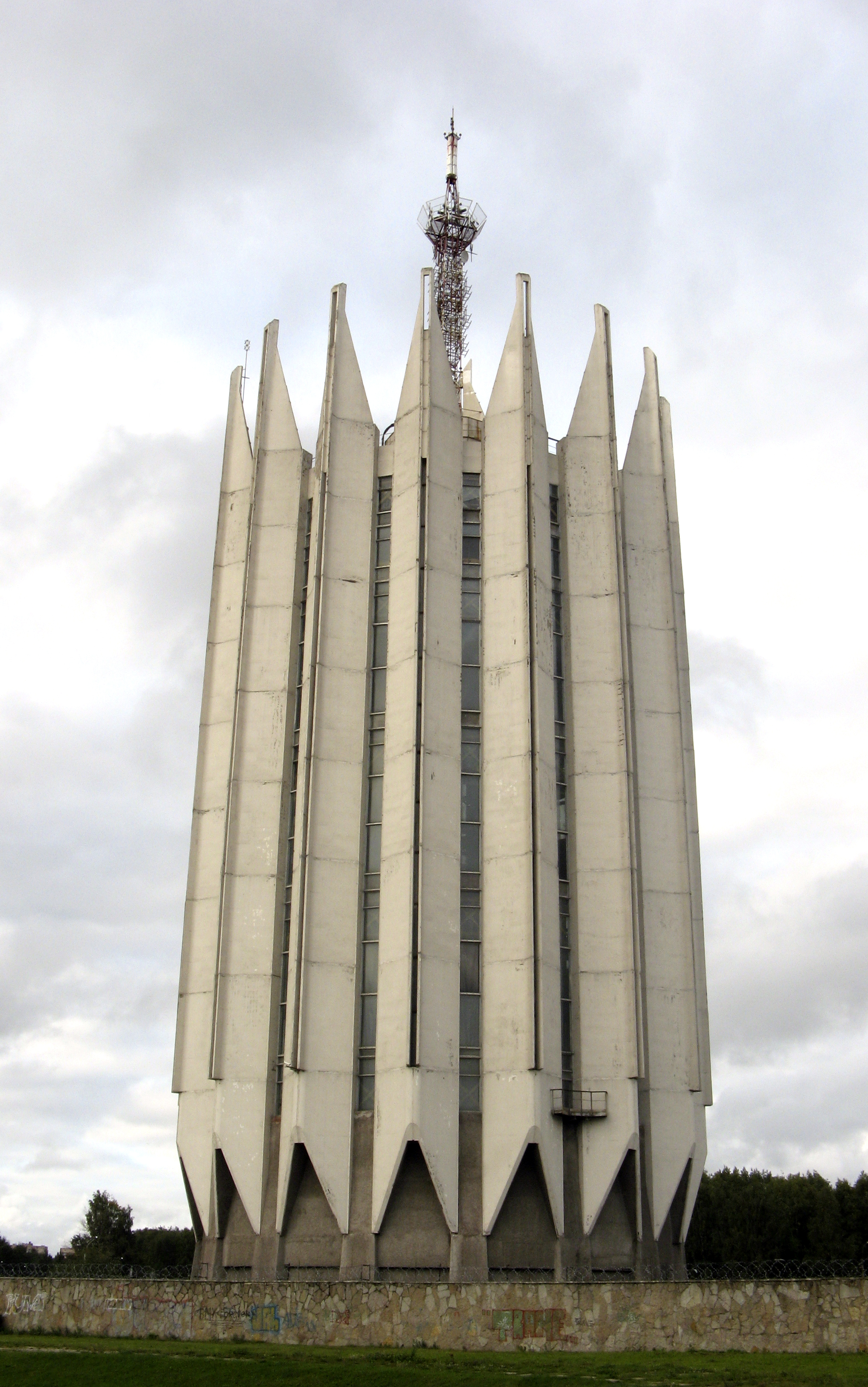
Laboratory tower of the State Scientific Center for Robotics and Technical Cybernetics

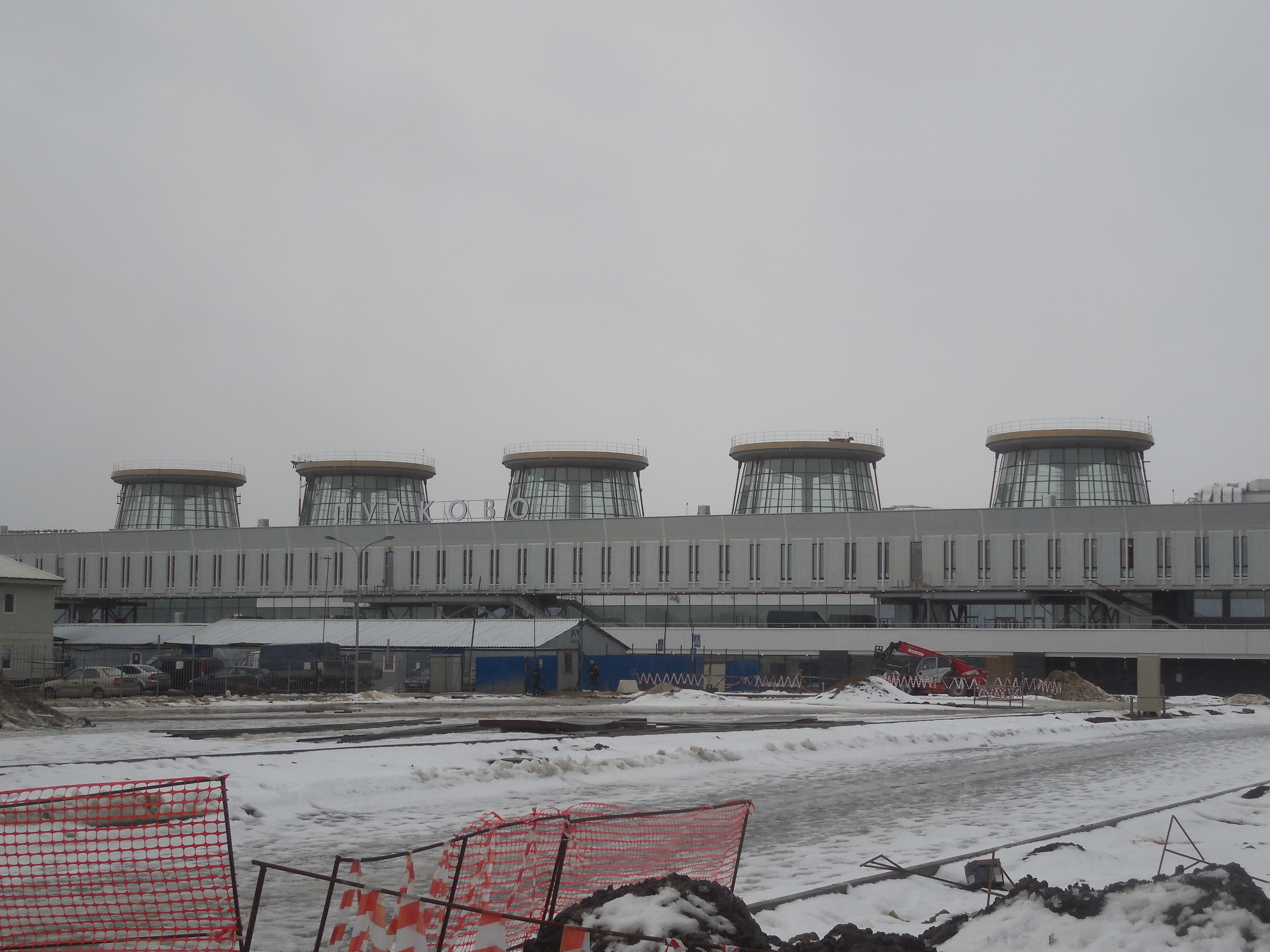
Pulkovo Airport Terminal ("Five Glasses")

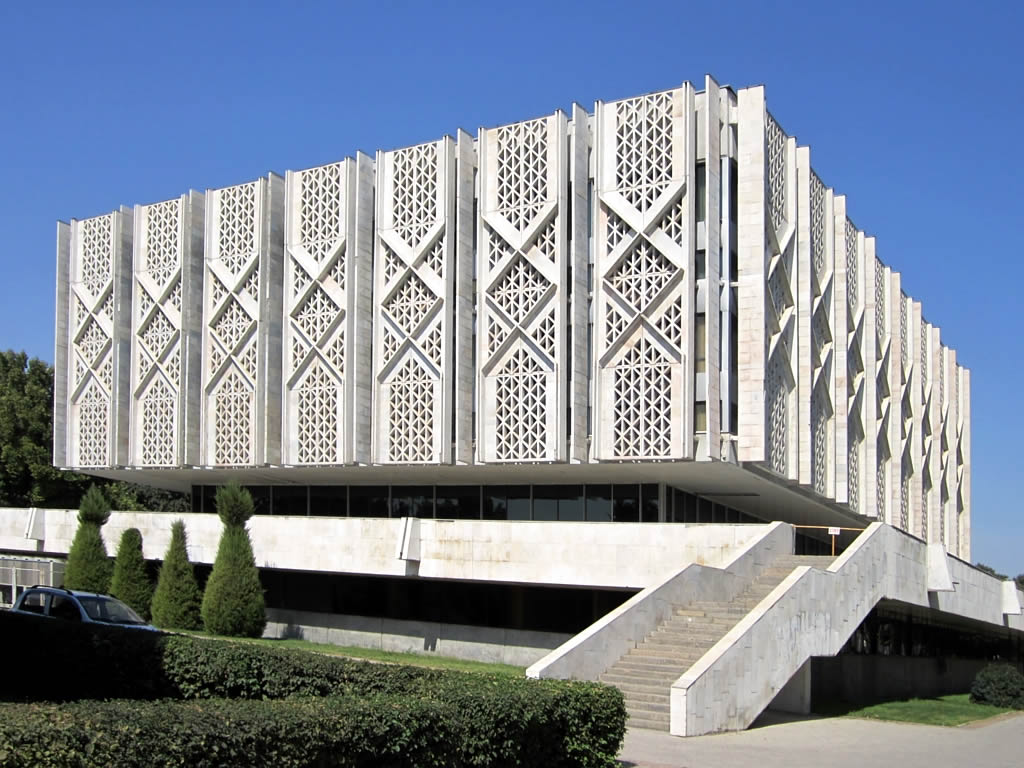
History Museum of the People of Uzbekistan in Tashkent

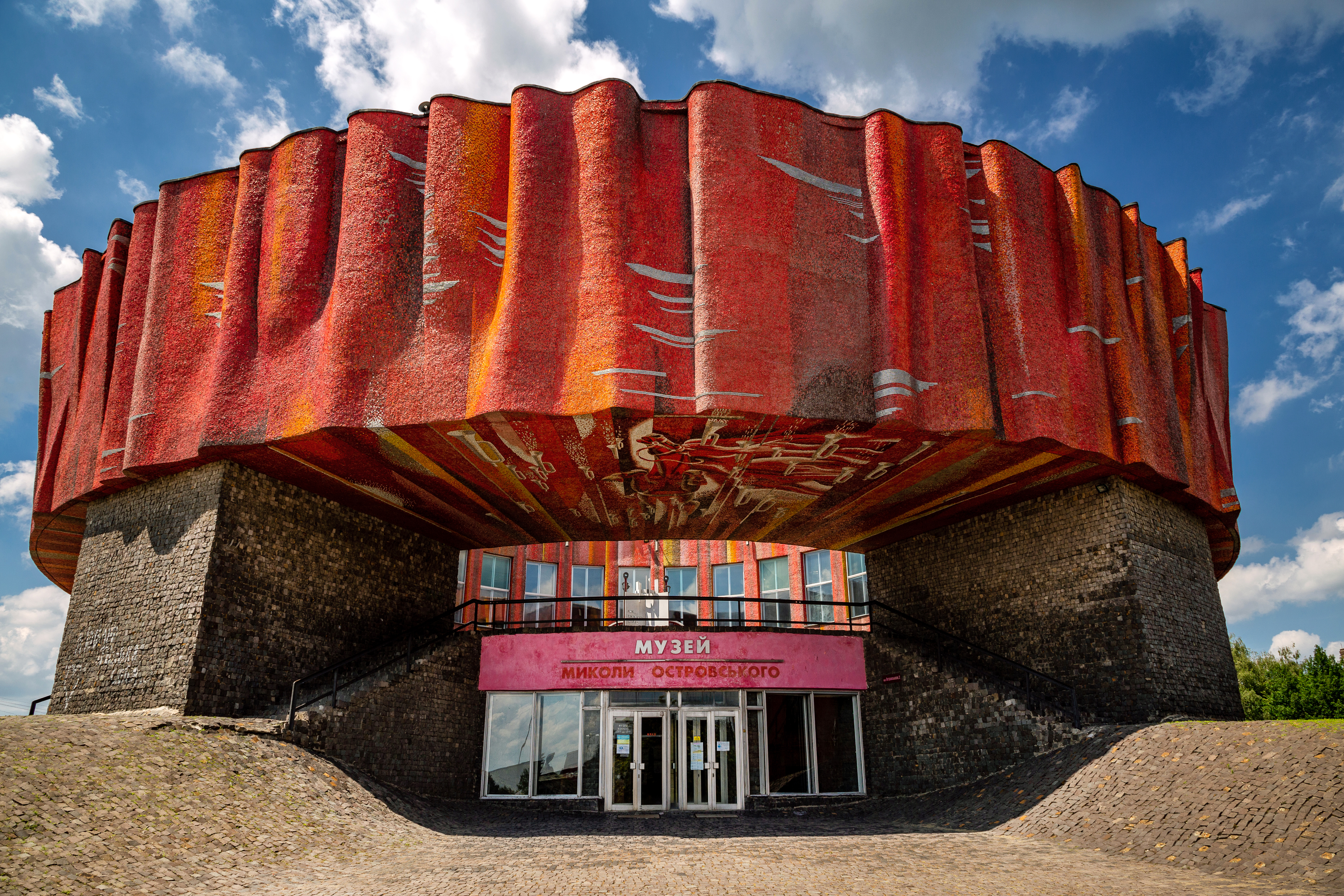
Museum of Ostrovsky (now Museum of Propaganda) in Shepetivka

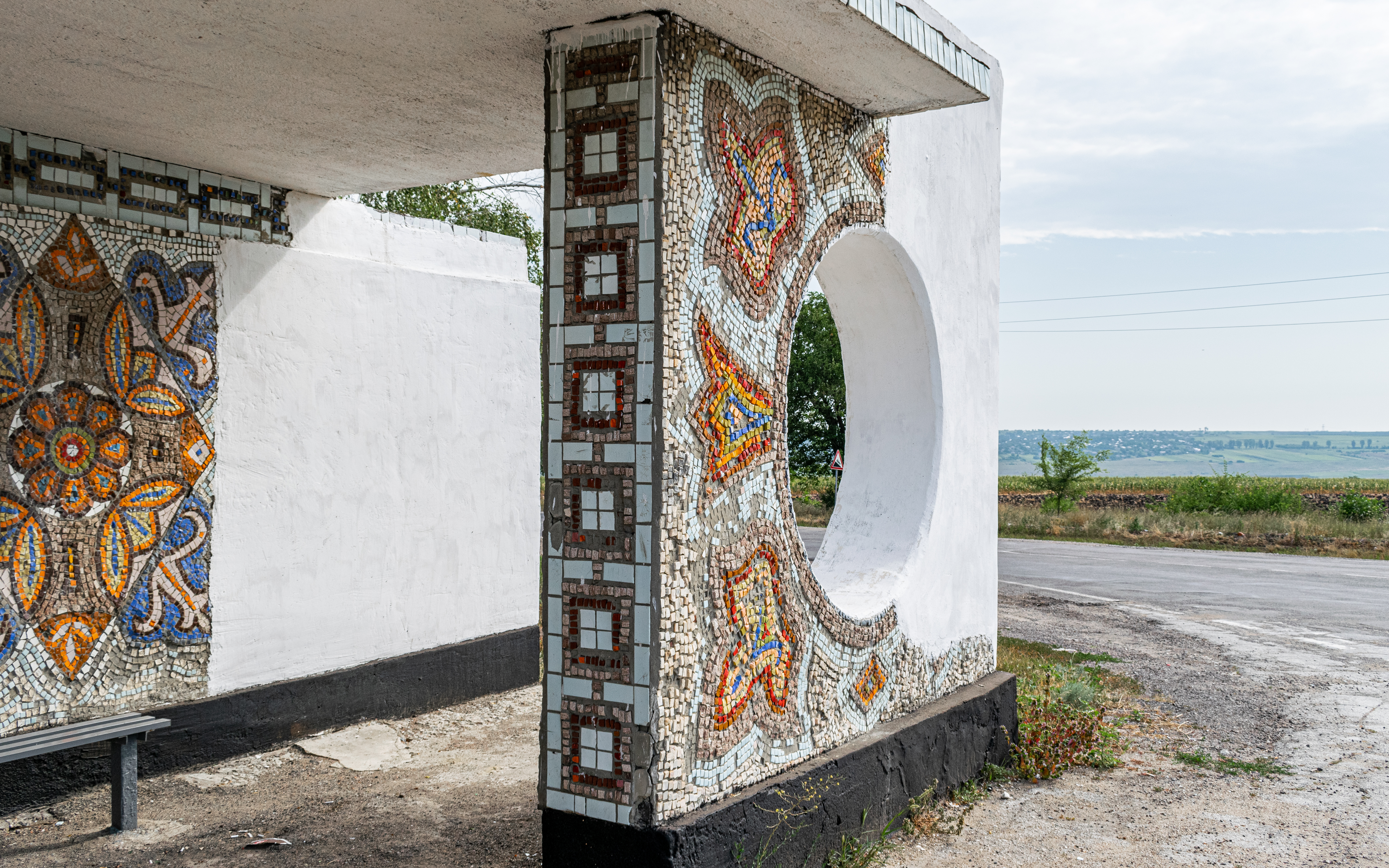
Experimental small-form: bus pavilion in Moldova

== Criticism of the style ==
The main criticism of this architectural style was that after the Stalinist "decorativeness", the purely functional austerity of modernism (starting in the Khrushchev era) deprived architects of creative freedom. As for the views of ordinary citizens, many Soviet people were dissatisfied with the so-called "box houses", which they considered lacking cultural and artistic value.

Furthermore, the art of this period in general, and architecture in particular, was characterized by a formal approach and adherence to ideological guidelines.

Thus, in an open letter to Mikhail Suslov, a group of artists from the circle of E. M. Belyutin criticized the formal approach to art and the practice of creating works of art within the framework of state commissions.

== See also ==
- Khrushchyovka
- Housing construction in the Soviet Union

== Literature ==
- Bronovitskaya, Anna Yulianovna; Malinin, Nikolai Sergeevich; Palmin, Yuri I. (2023). Leningrad: Architecture of Soviet Modernism 1955–1991. Moscow: Garage Museum of Contemporary Art. p. 344. ISBN 978-5-6045382-0-3.
- Belogolovsky, Vladimir A. (2010). "Взгляд из XXI века на советский модернизм 1955—1985 гг". Жилищное строительство.
- Chukhovich, Boris L.; Kazakova, Olga V. (2025). Tashkent: Architecture of Soviet Modernism. 1955–1991 (in Russian). Moscow: Garage Museum of Contemporary Art. p. 512. ISBN 978-5-6051716-8-3.
- Rykov A. V.. "Modernist Art and the Idea of Progress." Vestnik of Saint Petersburg University. Series 2. 2014. Issue 3. pp. 73–82.
- Felix Novikov, Vladimir Belogolovsky. Soviet Modernism: 1955–1985. Tatlin. ISBN 978-5-903433-43-8
- Karen Balyan. Architecture of Soviet Modernism. Master | Artur Tarkhanyan, Spartak Khachikyan, Grigory Pogosyan. Tatlin. ISBN 978-5-903433-77-3
- Pioneers of Soviet Modernism. Architecture and Urban Planning / compiled by I. V. Chepkunova, P. Yu. Streltsova, K. A. Kokorina, M. R. Ametova; translated into English by K. A. Kokorina. Moscow: Kuchkovo Pole Muzeon, 2020. 240 pp., ill. ISBN 978-5-907174-11-5
