= Soviet bus stops =

Architectural typology in the Soviet Union

- Советские автобусные остановки (Russian)
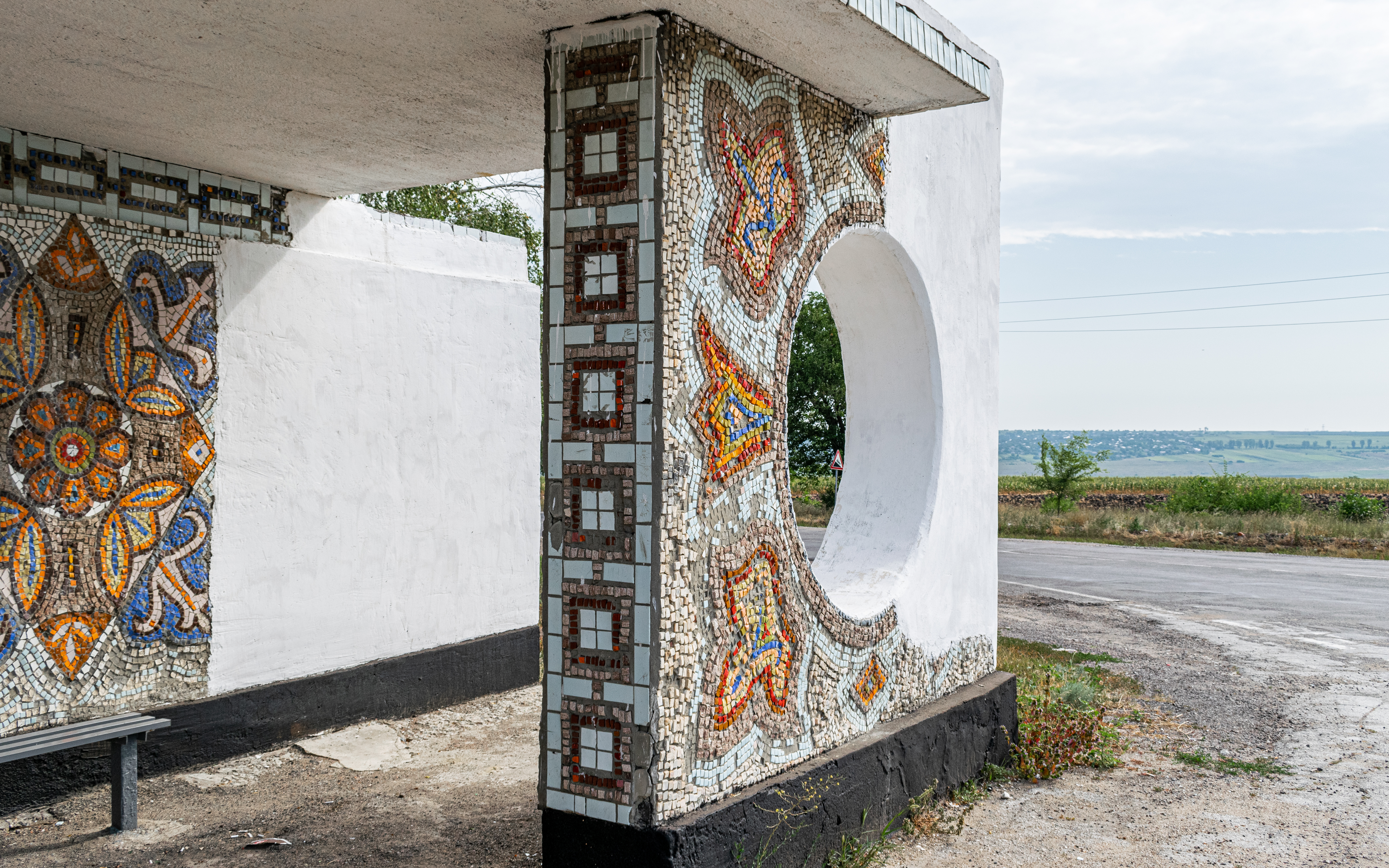
- Representative example: reinforced concrete pavilion in Grinăuți (Rîșcani), Moldova (47°51′06.3″N 27°47′18.1″E). Note the mosaic and non-standardized form distinctive for the typology.

General information
- Status: Endangered / Unprotected
- Type: Roadside infrastructure / Minor architectural form
- Architectural style: Soviet architectural modernism; Brutalist architecture; Vernacular architecture
- Location: Soviet Union (former); Post-Soviet states
- Completed: c. 1960s–1990s
- Client: Likely local Kolkhoz (Collective Farm) or regional road dept.

Technical details
- Material: Reinforced concrete, Mosaic, Tufa, Metal

Soviet bus stops (also known as Soviet bus pavilions; Russian: советские автобусные остановки) constitute a distinct architectural typology that emerged within the Soviet Union during the second half of the 20th century. Unlike major public buildings, which were subject to strict centralization and ideological oversight under the Generalny Plan (General Plan), bus stops were frequently classified as "minor architectural forms" (Russian: малые архитектурные формы). This regulatory status created a loophole for artistic freedom, allowing for a diverse range of structures that incorporated regional artistic traditions, constructivist geometry, and brutalist aesthetics.

Scholars have described these structures as "gazebos for the people," contrasting them with the "palaces for the people" exemplified by the Moscow Metro. They represent a decentralized and often improvised form of civic infrastructure that prioritized local expression over standardization.

== History and regulatory context ==
Following the Khrushchev Thaw and the 1955 decree "On the Elimination of Excesses in Design and Construction", Soviet architecture largely shifted toward standardized, prefabricated industrial construction (exemplified by the Khrushchevka). However, the expansion of road infrastructure networks into the peripheral republics required thousands of roadside shelters to connect collective farms and regional centers.

Bus stops were typically commissioned by local road construction departments or collective farms rather than central planning committees in Moscow. Due to their small scale and low budget, they were effectively exempt from the rigorous GOST standards that governed major construction. This allowed local architects, sculptors, and architecture students to use bus stops as testbeds for daring designs that would have been rejected for larger state buildings.

== Regional variations ==
The architectural style of Soviet bus stops varied significantly by republic, often interpreting the Soviet doctrine of "Socialist in content, National in form" through a modernist lens.

=== The Caucasus ===
In Georgia and Armenia, bus stops frequently utilized local stone such as tufa and incorporated complex mosaic work. The Georgian artist and architect Zurab Tsereteli designed a notable series of bus stops in Abkhazia in the late 1960s. His designs often rejected the rectangular form entirely, favoring organic, shell-like structures and vibrant mosaics depicting marine life, local legends, or abstract patterns.

=== Central Asia ===
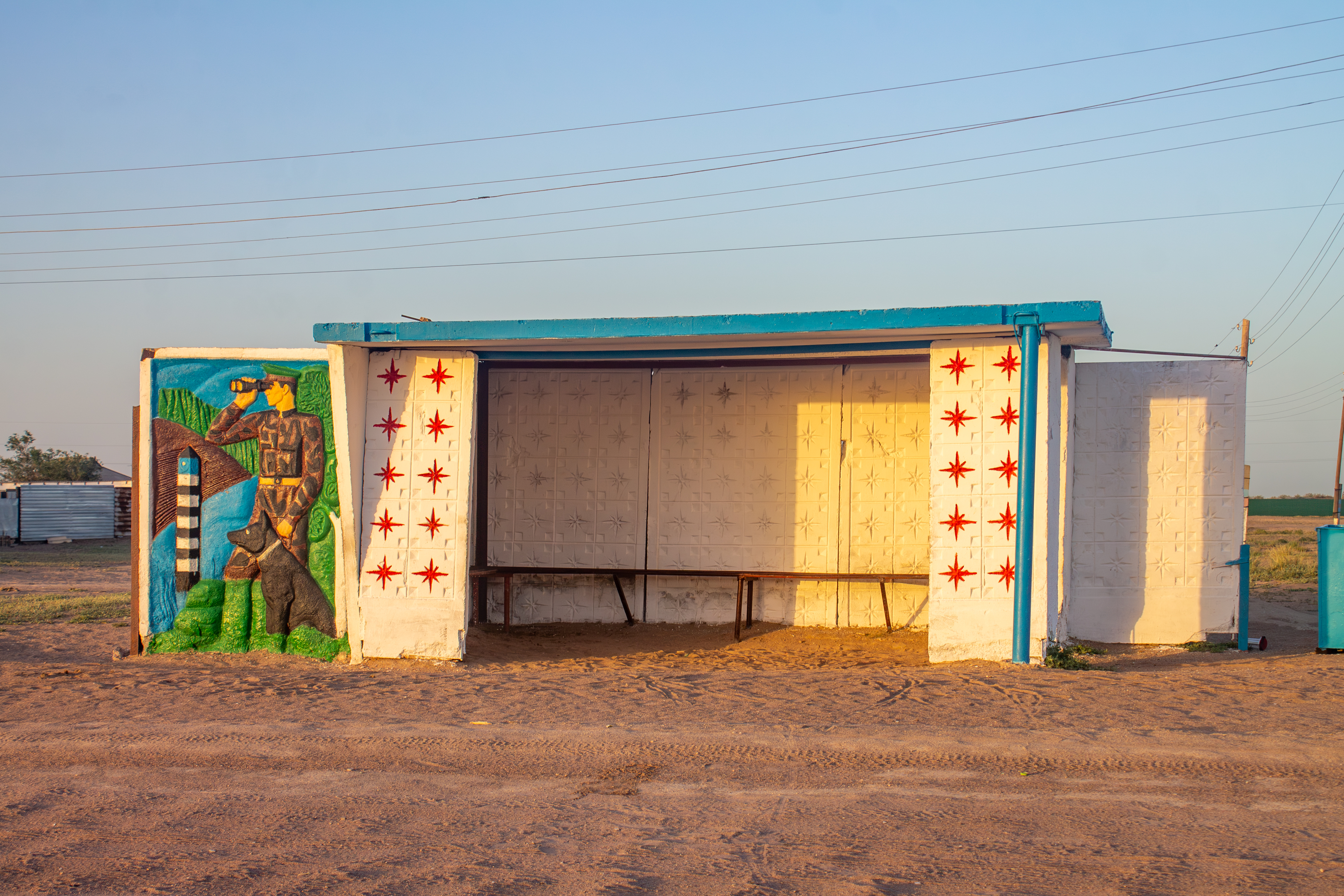
Bus stop in Orta Deresin, Karagandy Region, Kazakhstan.

In Kazakhstan, Kyrgyzstan, and Uzbekistan, bus stops often merged Socialist Modernism with traditional nomadic motifs. Structures in Kyrgyzstan occasionally referenced the form of the Yurt or the Kalpak (traditional hat). In the vast steppe regions, stops were often solitary, sculptural concrete forms designed to withstand harsh winds, serving as the only vertical landmark in a flat landscape.

=== The Baltics ===
In Estonia, specific emphasis was placed on timber construction, reflecting the local vernacular tradition of woodworking. Lithuanian examples often leaned toward sharp, angular concrete forms consistent with late-Soviet modernism.

== Endangered status and documentation ==
Since the dissolution of the Soviet Union in 1991, the entities originally responsible for maintaining these structures (such as collective farms) have largely ceased to exist. As a result, many bus stops have fallen into disrepair or have been demolished to be replaced by standardized industrial shelters.

Because these structures rarely possess official heritage listing, they are considered a "time-bound" architectural phenomenon. Their preservation has largely occurred through photographic documentation rather than physical conservation. In the 21st century, the typology gained international attention through the work of researchers and photographers such as Christopher Herwig (Canada) and Nanuka Zaalishvili (Georgia). In 2020, the scope of documentation expanded to East Asia with the publication of Soviet Bus Stops by Japanese photographer Ai Hoshino, who categorized the structures as part of a wider "Former Communist Heritage" (旧共産遺産).

== See also ==
- Soviet architecture
- Form (architecture)
- Soviet architectural modernism
- Narkomfin Building (Constructivist residential experiment)
- Ryugyong Hotel (Late socialist monumentalism)
