= Mikhail Posokhin =

Russian architect and teacher (1910–1989)

- Михаил Посохин
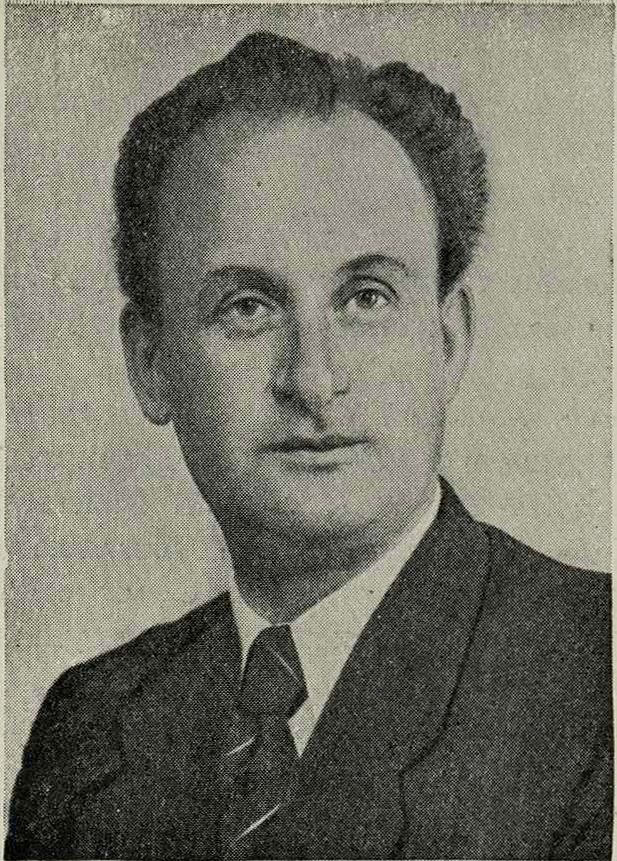
- Posokhin in 1949
- Born: November 30, 1910; Tomsk, Russian Empire
- Died: January 22, 1989 (aged 78); Moscow, RSFSR, Soviet Union
- Resting place: Vagankovo Cemetery
- Citizenship: Soviet
- Education: Moscow Architectural Institute
- Occupations: Architect, civil engineer
- Political party: CPSU
- Spouse: Galina Posokhina
- Children: Mikhail Posokhin
- Awards: Order of Lenin, Order of the Red Banner of Labour, Order of Friendship of Peoples, Order of the Badge of Honour, Medal "For Valiant Labour in the Great Patriotic War 1941–1945", Medal "In Commemoration of the 800th Anniversary of Moscow", Jubilee Medal "Thirty Years of Victory in the Great Patriotic War 1941–1945", Jubilee Medal "Forty Years of Victory in the Great Patriotic War 1941–1945", Lenin Prize, USSR State Prize, People's Architect of the USSR
- Buildings: Kudrinskaya Square Building, State Kremlin Palace, seat of the Russian Embassy in Washington
- Projects: Kalinin Street

Mikhail Vasilyevich Posokhin (Russian: Михаил Васильевич Посохин; 30 November 1910 - 22 January 1989) was a Soviet, Russian architect and teacher. People's Architect of the USSR (1970). Laureate of the Lenin Prize (1962), State Prize of the USSR (1980) and Stalin Prize of the second degree (1949). He is mostly known for being Chief Architect of Moscow (1960–1980). Among his main completed projects are a high-rise residential building on Kudrinskaya Square and the development of New Arbat Avenue in Moscow. He served as a member of the Union of Architects of the USSR. Full member of the USSR Academy of Arts (1979), member of the Presidium, academician-secretary of the Department of Architecture and Monumental Art of the USSR Academy of Arts (1979). Corresponding member of the USSR Academy of Architecture (1950–1955), Academy of Construction and Architecture (1956–1963).

== Biography ==
=== Early life ===
Born on November 30 (December 13), 1910 in Tomsk. His parents, Vasily Mikhailovich and Maria Alexandrovna, belonged to the educated philistines. His father worked in a printing house while his mother worked in a library.

After graduating from high school in 1927, he enrolled as a student at the Siberian Technological Institute, at the same time attended the creative studio of the artist Vadim Mizerov and worked as an apprentice decorator at the Tomsk Drama Theater.

Soon he moved to Kuznetsk-Sibirsky and began working on the construction of the Kuznetsk Metallurgical Plant. Then he entered the Kuznetskstroy Training Center and in 1931 received a diploma in civil engineering. He moved to the design department of the institution, where he took part in the creation of a “socialist city”.

In 1935, he moved to Moscow to enter the workshop of Alexey Shchusev at the Moscow Architectural Institute, and graduated from the university as an external student in three years. During his studies, he met the young architect Ashot Mndoyants, who became his friend and colleague for many years. According to the memoirs of Mikhail Posokhin, even many years after they met, the two architects "worked all day in the studio, then walked home from work together, continuing to discuss new ideas along the way, most often they came to us, had dinner, drank tea, and then on the vacant table, and often they laid out tracing paper and paper on the floor and continued to work, search, discuss, sketch". In the late 1930s, their first joint projects were presented at competitions at the air terminal in Moscow and the theater in Komsomolsk-on-Amur.

After the start of the war, he was assigned to an engineering reconnaissance company of a Civil Defense unit, which was engaged in the construction of camouflage structures and the prompt restoration of destroyed buildings. However, already in 1943, the young architect was attracted to cooperation by Dmitry Chechulin, who at that time was in charge of the reconstruction of the Mossovet building on Gorky Street. At the same time, Posokhin and Mndoyants were entrusted with the reconstruction of the building of the former Alexander School on Frunze Street, which was to house the General Staff of the Red Army. Work on the first independent project was completed in 1946. The building received typical features of the new Stalinist Empire style.

In 1946, he headed one of the design workshops of the Moscow City Council. Two years later, he and Mndoyants won a competition to create a Stalinist high-rise - a 24-story residential skyscraper on Vosstaniya Square. The facades of the building were decorated with elements characteristic of the Stalinist Empire style: sculptural groups, colonnades, pilasters and the spire crowning the building. Numerous innovative solutions were used in the residential building, which was unusual by Soviet standards. On the lower floors there was a two-hall cinema "Plamya", a laundry, and the largest grocery store in the USSR "Gastronom". The building also had underground parking for 134 cars. The unique building received an individual layout, expensive finishing and equipment. In particular, 28 four-room apartments were built in the house. In all apartments, the kitchens were equipped with refrigerators, built-in furniture, sinks with a crusher for the destruction of large waste, and access to a garbage chute was provided.

Posokhin wrote about the work on this building in his memoirs "Roads of Life". Among other things, he noted the fact that architects were categorically forbidden to use foreign magazines in order to avoid copying the techniques of Western masters. In 1949, the architect was awarded the Stalin Prize of the second degree for the completed project.

=== Typical residential development ===
He was interested not only in the creation of outstanding structures - he was one of the first architects in the USSR to develop and implement projects for large-panel buildings. In his book, published in 1953, he explained in detail the new principles of residential construction. He emphasized that for the rapid construction of new residential areas on the outskirts of the capital, “all-out industrialization is necessary... based on the typification and widespread use of structures, architectural details, elements of factory-made sanitary and engineering equipment.” The master believed that it was necessary to design new frame houses taking into account the future placement of shops, children's educational institutions and entertainment organizations on the ground floors. Builders should also think about decorating the rear facades and organizing the courtyard space.

He managed to realize his vision during the construction of four-story houses on Khoroshevskoye Highway. Work on the site began in 1948. This was the first experience in Soviet history of complex development of a residential area with panel-frame buildings. The next complex built was ten-story buildings on Kuusinen Street, the design of which was proposed back in 1953. The principles of residential housing construction that the architect promoted were close to the views of Nikita Khrushchev. Thanks to this, he avoided the accusations of “embellishment” that the leadership of the CPSU leveled against Soviet architects in the mid-1950s.

=== Iconic projects of the 1950s ===
In the mid-1950s, the main facade of the Moscow Hermitage Theatre was rebuilt according to his design. The Art Nouveau building received a fundamentally new appearance in the style of the Stalinist Empire style. To the small building, previously practically devoid of expressive decorative elements, two outbuildings connected by a colonnade were added.

On September 7, 1953, a decree of the CPSU Central Committee and the USSR Council of Ministers "On the construction of the Pantheon" was published, where it was planned to transfer the remains of those buried at the Kremlin Wall Necropolis and in the Lenin's Mausoleum. 10 major architects of the USSR were allowed to participate in the closed competition, including Posokhin. The presented projects were published in September of the following year in the magazine "Architecture of the USSR". As a starting point, all the contestants chose an antique temple with a colonnade (in Posokhin's design - two-tiered), which was consistent with the principles of the "Stalinist Empire style". However, already on November 1, 1954, Nikita Khrushchev began to fight against "decoration", which excluded the possibility of developing pompous Stalinist architecture in general and the Pantheon project in particular.

In the second half of the 1950s, a closed competition was held for the design of the Palace of the Soviets. Although the architect was not among the participants, he managed to build the Kremlin Palace of Congresses - the most outstanding building of the 1960s. In his project, he used the motifs proposed by Aleksandr Vlasov and Ivan Zholtovsky for the Palace of the Soviets. The central core of the building consisted of the Meeting Hall and Banquet Hall, designed for 6,000 and 4,500 people respectively. These rooms are surrounded on three sides by the interconnected spaces of the foyer and corridors. He implemented a similar layout of premises in the project of the Oktyabr cinema, which was created in the complex development of Kalinin Avenue.

The construction of the minimalist Palace of Congresses with the idea of opening the internal space to the outside served as a reflection of the new architecture of the Khrushchev Thaw. In order to erect a huge building, it was necessary to destroy part of the historical buildings of the Kremlin. The architect and his colleagues tried to harmoniously fit the huge parallelepiped into the existing architectural ensemble. For this purpose, it was necessary to deepen the lower level of the hall and vestibule by 15 m. The building was put into operation already in 1961, and a year later he was awarded the Lenin Prize for the implementation of the project.

=== Chief Architect of Moscow ===
==== Development of Kalinin Avenue ====
In 1960, Mikhail Posokhin headed the Architectural and Planning Department of Moscow. During his tenure in office, the architectural appearance of the capital changed radically. The first major construction project he initiated was the new Kalinin Avenue. After completion of work in 1962, the highway became the embodiment of the ideas of the Soviet government on the development of domestic architecture.

The original plan included many innovative solutions. The highway had to pass below the surface of the earth, and numerous pedestrian bridges had to be laid over it. The 26-story high-rise buildings on the southern part of the avenue were one huge commune, connected by a common two-story stylobate, in which it was proposed to create entertainment facilities. According to the original plan, these houses were designed exclusively for small-sized apartments for young families. During the implementation of the plan, numerous changes were made to the project. At the request of Nikita Khrushchev, a regular road surface was laid, which is why the complexes of the northern and southern parts of the avenue turned out to be separate. In 1964, with the coming to power of the new government, offices were created in the southern buildings instead of apartments.

In the early 1970s, in the book “A City for Man,” the architect wrote:

A city without free spaces is a labyrinth that oppresses people. There is a need for a rhythmic alternation of closed and open spaces, a combination of narrow and wide streets, large and small squares, boulevards and parks... Visual perception of the city plan, understanding of its spatial structure give a person the opportunity to more deeply comprehend the beauty and harmony of the city

.

The new avenue became an important milestone in the development of standard construction as a clear example of the expressive effect of alternating high-rise and low-rise buildings. However, a holistic perception of the complex is only possible when driving a car. For a pedestrian, the rhythmic composition looks too enlarged and monotonous. Although the construction of Kalinin Avenue was part of the transformation of Moscow from an old city into a modern metropolis, the destruction of ancient buildings and the creation of high-rise buildings in the historical center caused criticism from the cultural community.

His next significant work was the complex of the Comecon buildings. The main building, 31 floors high, received an original shape in the form of two curved plates connected by a rectangular volume. A similar technique logically developed the ideas for the development of New Arbat. In this case, a smooth curve diluted the monotony of the corridors and provided the viewer from the outside with a comfortable glare of the glass surface.

==== Capital development plans ====
In the 1960s, Posokhin together with the architect Nikolai Ullas led the work on a master plan for the development of Moscow. It was assumed that it would become a model for the development of all Soviet cities at the beginning of the 21st century. In 1971, the document was approved and published. The authors indicated fairly strict external borders of Moscow. The expansion of the city was supposed to be limited by a forested area. At the same time, it was planned to create a network of satellite cities within a radius of 100 km from the capital. According to the project, the capital's radial-ring road system was preserved, but supplemented by a rectangular system of expressways. Four of them (Khovrino - Borisovo, Tyoply Stan - Vladychino, Ochakovo - Mytishchi and Tatarovo - Biryulyovo) were supposed to pass 5 km from the center and in the future go beyond the Moscow Ring Road as exits to suburban highways. To create such a chain of roads, numerous tunnels and overpasses had to be built. This part of the project remained unimplemented.

To ensure the viability of the capital, a new polycentric structure was required, with the historical center as the main zone and seven new ones located on the periphery. Industrial enterprises should have been moved outside the city or production facilities had to be modernized. The implementation of the master plan turned out to be impracticable under the conditions of the Soviet economic system. One of the points stated that the population of Moscow would increase to 8 million people by 2000. Based on this, it was possible to invest more effort and money in the construction of public buildings and the development of transport infrastructure. Soviet officials, on the contrary, sought to increase the volume of residential development, which provoked rapid population growth, and the threshold of 8 million was reached already in 1980. At the same time, the proper level of organization of the urban environment was not ensured. The main idea of the plan—the creation of a polycentric city—also remained unfulfilled, and the construction of the Third Ring Road and the commissioning of new metro lines dragged on for many years.

==== Complex development ====
In the mid-1960s, the architect headed the reconstruction of Suzdal, and in the early 1970s, he initiated a quarter-by-quarter survey of the historical buildings of Moscow. As a result, the multi-volume book "Architectural Monuments of Moscow" was published and Russia's first Pedestrian zone, Arbat Street, was reconstructed.

In the early 1970s, under his leadership, the construction of a new experimental district, Chertanovo began. The creators sought to achieve several goals. Firstly, to avoid the monotony of buildings, which was the result of the industrial production of wall panels. For this purpose, houses with complex configurations and variable number of storeys were erected. Underground parking and transport networks were installed in the microdistrict to partially isolate roadways from pedestrian areas. Each house formed a small closed courtyard space.

When creating Northern Chertanovo, for the first time in the Soviet Union, when creating residential buildings from standard structures, a wide spacing of load-bearing walls was used - 7.2 m. This made it possible to use a free layout: with a variation of rooms from 1 to 5, new residents could choose 40 options for apartments, including - two-level. Due to the inertia of the country's economic system, the construction of one microdistrict in Moscow was delayed for 13 years.

The separation of zones for the movement of cars and pedestrians was even more clearly implemented in the project of the Moscow Olympic Village (1977–1980). A group of architects led by Mikhail Posokhin skillfully used the 11-meter height difference that exists within the huge structure.

The architect most fully implemented the idea of integrated development in the project of the World Trade Center. According to the architects' plans, the WTC buildings housed an international-class hotel with 600 rooms, an apart-hotel with 625 rooms, and a 22-story office center. A single three-story stylobate was created for the entire complex, which housed various public institutions: from conference rooms to restaurants.

=== Works abroad ===
At the end of the 1950s, the architect began work on the complex development of a resort in Pitsunda, Abkhaz SSR. This was the first large-scale recreational facility project completely developed in the Soviet Union. While working in Georgian SSR, Posokhin, on the advice of Ashot Mndoyants, invited the novice artist Zurab Tsereteli to work, who created sculptural compositions decorated with mosaic panels.

The architect created two large embassy complexes: in Brasília in 1968-1974 and in Washington, D.C. in 1970–1993. The projects were radically different from each other. The building in Brazil was decorated brightly, with contrasting colors on the walls and balconies on the main façade. The building in the United States received a monumental appearance in the strict style of official buildings in Washington.

From an architectural point of view, the more interesting foreign projects were the USSR pavilions, which the architect designed for the World Exhibitions in Montreal (1967) and Expo '70 in Osaka (1970). The Canadian pavilion was designed in the style of Moscow buildings. The building received glazing along the entire perimeter and a powerful stylobate, which housed part of the public premises. The construction in Japan was distinguished by its originality: it symbolized a waving red banner. Due to its maximum height of 104 m, the pavilion was visible from all corners of the exhibition.

=== Social and teaching activities ===
Along with his main activities, he was involved in organizational and educational projects. In 1963–1967, he created and headed the State Committee for Civil Engineering and Architecture under the State Committee for Construction, reorganized the system of design organizations, and united the most active architectural forces in the country.

He taught architectural design at the Moscow Architectural Institute for eight years (1967–1975), and opened the Faculty of Architecture at the Academy of Arts.

He was also elected as a deputy of the Supreme Soviet of the Soviet Union in the 6-9 convocations. Delegate to the 22nd to XXV Congresses of the CPSU.

Since he successfully carried out diametrically opposed projects, he was respected by the party leadership throughout his career. Back in the Stalin era, he was appointed deputy head of the Architectural and Planning Department of Moscow. He retained this position even after N. Khrushchev came to power. Under N. Khrushchev, he took the post of Chief Architect of Moscow and remained in this position for most of the Brezhnev rule. The master was also recognized by the foreign professional community. In 1978, he was elected an Honorary Member of the American Institute of Architects.

He died on January 22, 1989, in Moscow. He was buried next to his parents at the Vagankovo Cemetery.

Political offices
Preceded by Iosif Loveyko	Chief Architect of Moscow; 1960—1980	Succeeded by Gleb Makarevich
