= Iosif Loveyko =

Soviet architect (1906–1996)

- Иосиф Ловейко
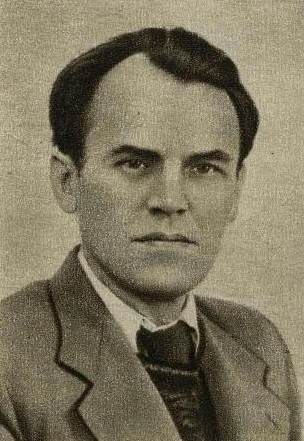
- Iosif Loveyko in 1951
- Born: February 6, 1906
- Died: September 9, 1996 (aged 90); Moscow
- Resting place: Kuntsevo Cemetery
- Citizenship: Soviet
- Education: Vkhutemas
- Occupations: Architect, civil engineer
- Political party: CPSU
- Awards: Order of Lenin, Order of the October Revolution, Order of the Patriotic War, Jubilee Medal "In Commemoration of the 100th Anniversary of the Birth of Vladimir Ilyich Lenin", Medal "In Commemoration of the 800th Anniversary of Moscow", Stalin Prize, People's Architect of the USSR, Merited Construction Worker of the RSFSR
- Buildings: Sovietsky Hotel; Yerevan Cinema; Krasnopresnenskaya Embankment 2/1 administrative building of the NKVD
- Design: Lubyanka Moscow Metro

Iosif Ignatyevich Loveyko (Russian: Иосиф Игнатьевич Ловейко); February 6, 1906, Prokhory, Imansky district, Primorsky Krai, Russian Empire - 9 September 1996, Moscow) was a Soviet and Russian architect. He served as chief architect of Moscow from 1955 to 1960. He was awarded the title People's Architect of the USSR (1975).

== Biography ==
Born into a peasant family in the village of Prokhory (now Spassky District, Primorsky Krai).

He graduated from a vocational school, then entered the workers' school in Vladivostok. The workers' faculty teachers paid attention to his artistic abilities and sent him to the Moscow Vkhutemas (since 1926 - VKHUTEIN, since 1930 it has been divided into several universities, including the Institute of Proletarian Fine Arts, the Moscow Architectural Institute, the Stroganov Art and Industrial Institute, etc.) He applied to the Faculty of Architecture, which he graduated in 1931. The curator of his graduation project was the constructivist architect Alexander Vesnin.

After graduation, he began working in the construction section of the Supreme Economic Council of the RSFSR, and in the mid-1930s he moved to the architectural and design workshop No. 5 of the Moscow City Council under the leadership of Daniil Fridman. In 1934, he developed a project for the Volgostroy club, built in Rybinsk. This is the only structure he completed outside of Moscow. At the same time, the young architect designed the first houses in the capital - the residential development of Kotelnicheskaya and Goncharnaya embankments (1934–1937). In collaboration with Daniil Fridman, he created the lobby of the Dzerzhinskaya metro station in 1935. The original stylistic solution of this structure was the double arched portal[. In 1937-1939 he supervised the construction of the eastern building of the Moscow Orphanage. Thus, he completed the composition proposed by the author of the project, Karl Blank, in the middle of the 18th century.

Although the architect's own style had not yet been fully formed, architect Karo Alabyan drew attention to his work in the article "Against formalism, simplification, eclecticism", which was published in the April issue of "Architecture of the USSR" in 1936. The article set the standards of Soviet architecture and at the same time criticized all "anti-Soviet" styles. The author called "simplistic eclecticism" unacceptable and included Loveyko among the "simple people". This assessment influenced the young architect, so his works of the 1940s and early 1950s are strikingly different from his earlier ones.

After the start of the war, he remained in the capital to participate in the development of Moscow defensive structures.

Since 1944, he again began designing civil buildings and in 1946 headed the Architectural and Construction Workshop of the Moscow City Council. In the post-war decade, he developed projects in the "Stalinist architecture" style. At that time, "Seven Sisters with their vertical composition were recognized as a standard, a symbol of the "emancipation of the mighty forces" of the country. Following architectural fashion, the architect decorated the main facades with massive porticos and colonnades. Among his similar works are the administrative building of the NKVD (current address - Gazetny Lane, 6), a residential building on Krasnopresnenskaya Embankment, 2/1, and the Sovietsky Hotel.

=== Chief architect of Moscow ===
In 1955, he was appointed head of the Architectural and Planning Department of Moscow. During his five years in office, he continued to develop projects that were adopted under his predecessor Aleksandr Vlasov. The main task of the Moscow authorities was the construction of new districts on the outskirts of the capital. It was in the second half of the 1950s that the design of individual buildings was abandoned; the microdistrict became the main unit of urban development.

During the time of Loveyko, the leader began the widespread use of new construction materials. So, instead of brick, large concrete blocks began to be used from 1955, and from 1958, expanded clay concrete panels were also used. Another feature of mass development was the limitation of the height of residential premises to 2.5 m. In one private conversation, the architect admitted that small apartments in "dull boxes" are only part of the problem. In his opinion, houses with load-bearing partitions and walls made of thin vibrating panels should have collapsed within 20 years. He could not influence the situation, since Nikita Khrushchev insisted on reducing the cost of construction.

As the chief architect of Moscow, he was involved in the development of promising highways. In 1960, he announced the need to create the Third and the unrealized Fourth and Fifth road rings in the capital. He also proposed rebuilding the Garden Ring to avoid the intersection of ring and radial roads. He saw the solution to this problem in creating tunnels at street intersections. It is noteworthy that already in 1960 he noted the need to build multi-storey garages-hotels for private vehicles in Moscow.

In 1957–1959, he took part in two closed competitions for the design of the Palace of the Soviets, which was planned to be built in the south-west, not far from the Main building of Moscow State University. The first project he proposed was a monumental building with a multi-columned portico. A special feature of the idea was the orientation of the main façade to the south. The jury criticized the compositional solution: according to the judges, in such an orientation the Palace looked "turned away" from Moscow and the university. Nevertheless, the project was awarded an honorable mention.

In the second round of the competition, the architect put forward a project that reflected the ideas of his predecessor Aleksandr Vlasov. The building with a large glass area was a parallelepiped, devoid of expressive decorative elements. When developing the second project, he moved away from creating an internal layout in relation to the Great Hall. Instead, he made the "Hall of Peoples" the center of the composition, a forum-amphitheater where public meetings and festivities were supposed to be held. Like the ideas of other architects, his plan was rejected.

=== Mosproekt-1 and later life ===
In 1961, he headed architectural workshop No. 2 of the Mosproekt-1 Directorate and remained in this position until his retirement in 1989. Since savings remained the main requirement for new residential development projects, houses were built according to standard designs, and to simplify the work of housebuilding enterprises, the number of standard projects was reduced. In such conditions, the architect supervised the construction of the new Moscow districts of Zapadnoye Degunino and Vostochnoye Degunino (1962–1972), Bibirevo (1975–1978) and Lianozovo (1975–1978).

In parallel, since the 1960s, Soviet architects returned to the idea of functionalism: the external form of a building was a reflection of the processes for which it was intended. This tendency was especially pronounced during the creation of public institutions. The Yerevan Cinema was built according to this principle, the project of which was developed by the architect together with Nikolai Gaigarov and Vsevolod Talkovsky in 1970. The amphitheater of the main hall with 1,600 seats hangs over the wedge-shaped foyer and a small hall with 300 seats, which is located in the basement.

The architect's last project was the unrealized Memorial Temple in honor of the 1000th anniversary of the Christianization of Rus', which he proposed in 1986.

Correspondent member of the USSR Academy of Arts (1983). Member of the Union of Architects of the USSR. Chairman of the Board of the Moscow Branch of the Union of Architects of the USSR (1953–55).

Deputy of the Supreme Soviet of the RSFSR of the 5th convocation. Delegate to the 22nd Congress of the CPSU.

He died in Moscow on September 9, 1996. He was buried at the Kuntsevo Cemetery.

Political offices
Preceded by Aleksandr Vlasov	Chief Architect of Moscow; 1955—1960	Succeeded by Mikhail Posokhin
