= Kudrinskaya Square Building =

Stalinist skyscraper in Moscow

- Жилой дом на Кудринской площади
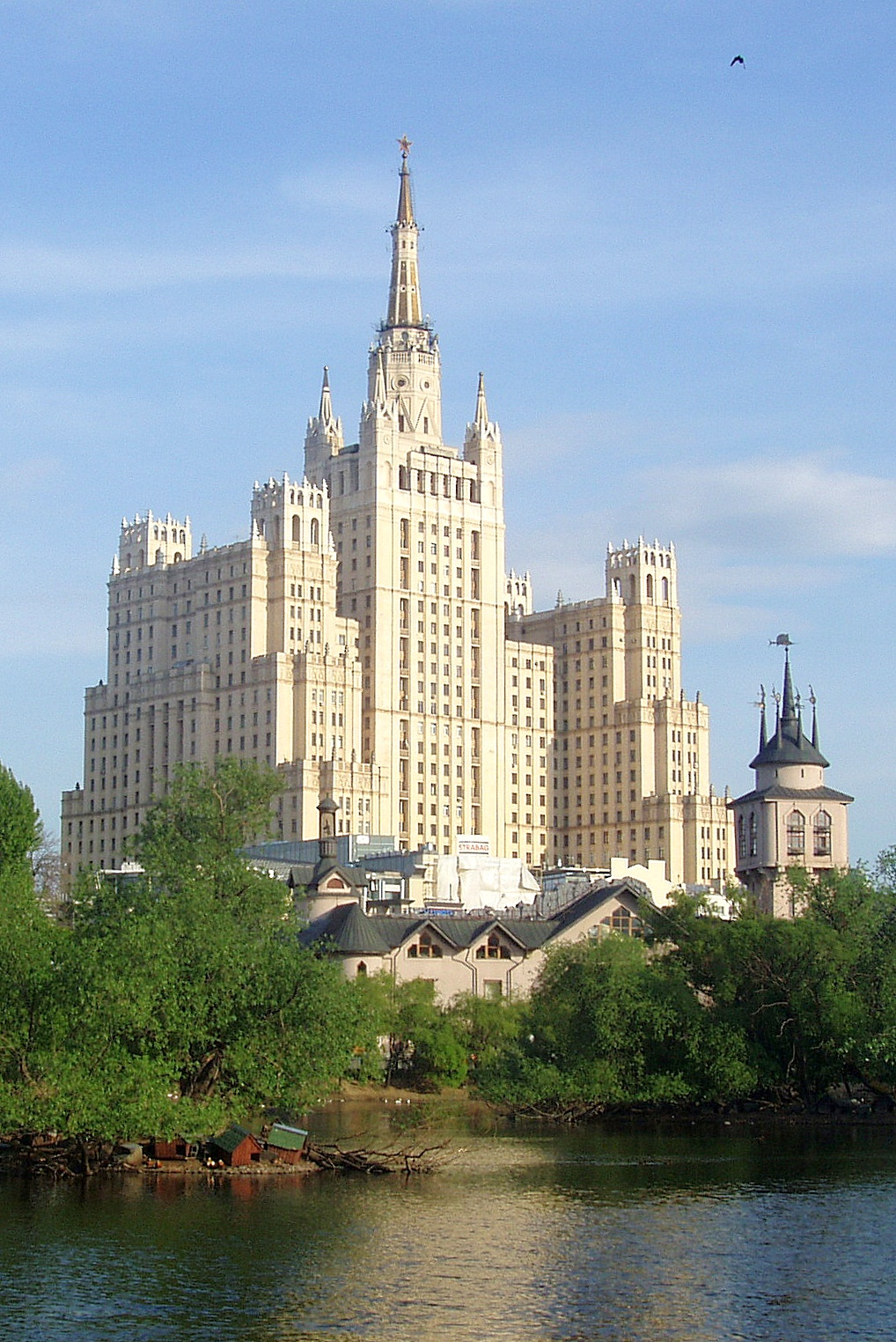
- Interactive map of the Kudrinskaya Square Building area

General information
- Architectural style: Stalinist
- Location: 1 Kudrinskaya Square, Presnensky District, Moscow, Russia
- Coordinates: 55°45′32″N 37°34′50″E
- Construction started: 1950
- Completed: 1954

Height
- Roof: 160 m (520 ft)

Technical details
- Floor count: 22

Design and construction
- Architects: Mikhail Posokhin, Ashot Mndoyants

The Kudrinskaya Square Building is a building in Moscow, one of Seven Sisters Of Moscow Stalinist skyscrapers, designed by Mikhail Posokhin (Russian: Михаил Посохин) and Ashot Mndoyants (Ашот Мндоянц).

== Design and construction features ==
The building was richly decorated but lacked a unified stylistic direction. The parapets are in the ancient Roman style. The lobbies decorated with marble columns, stained-glass windows, and lamps in the form of candelabra are a reminiscence of Gothic interiors. The pointed turrets around the spire resemble the domes of an Eastern Orthodox church. On the roof of the stylobate, there are sculptural portraits of Soviet workers and soldiers.

One of the stylistic features of the building were the stained glass windows, which are located in the halls above the lifts and the windows of the deli. Motifs from Russian folk culture were used in the design. The floors in the living rooms and corridors of the flats were laid with oak parquet, the bathrooms were tiled with metal tiles, and the kitchens with linoleum.

All the flats had refrigerators and built-in furniture in the kitchens. In addition to the ventilation system, the building had centralised air conditioning. The building was equipped with a centralized dust extraction system, which consisted of brushes and hoses located in each flat, piping running along with the building, and vacuuming stations installed in the basement. The collected dust was filtered and discharged into the sewage system, and the purified air was discharged into the street. Boilers were installed in the basement to provide heating for the whole building.

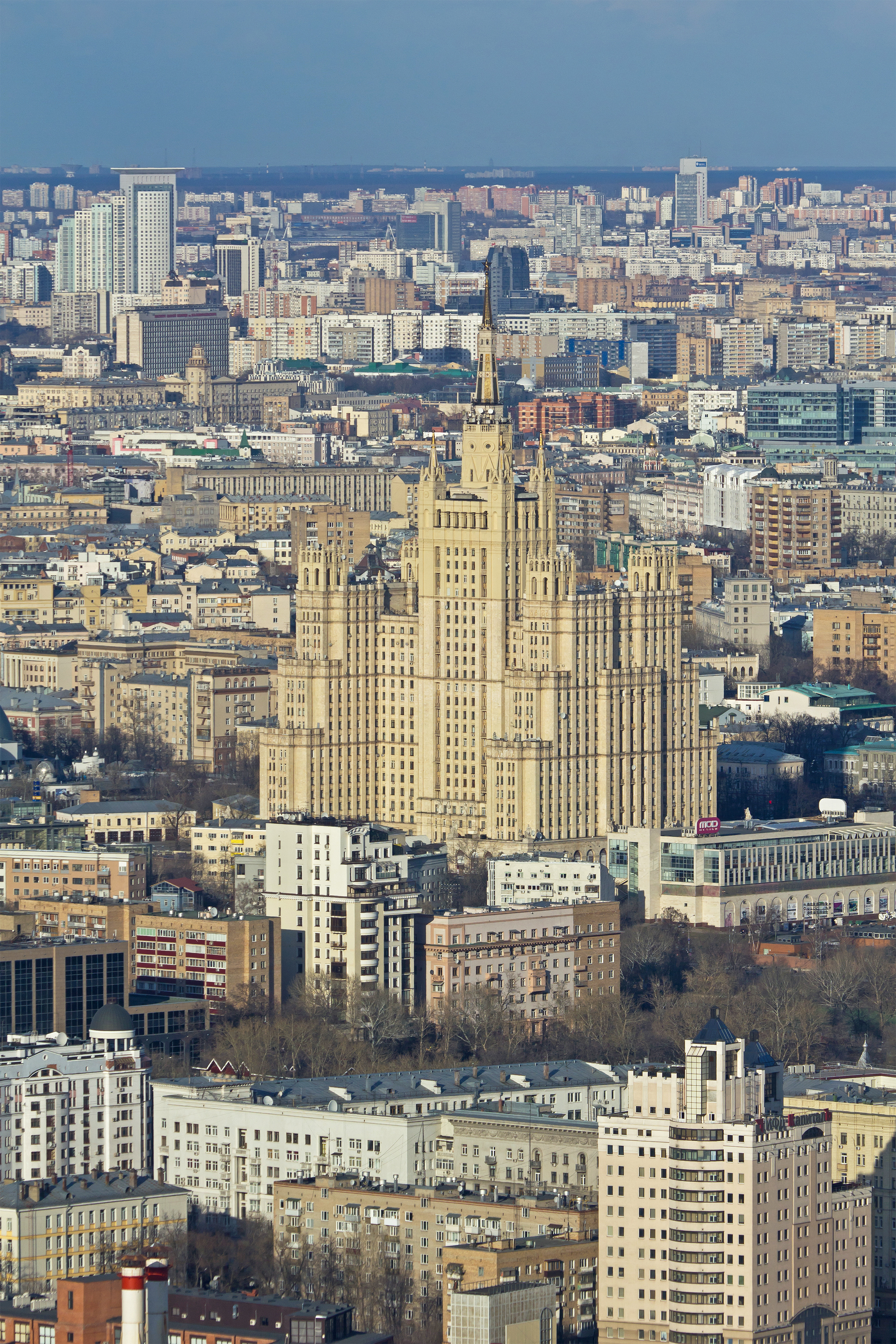
View from the observation point of Imperia Tower.

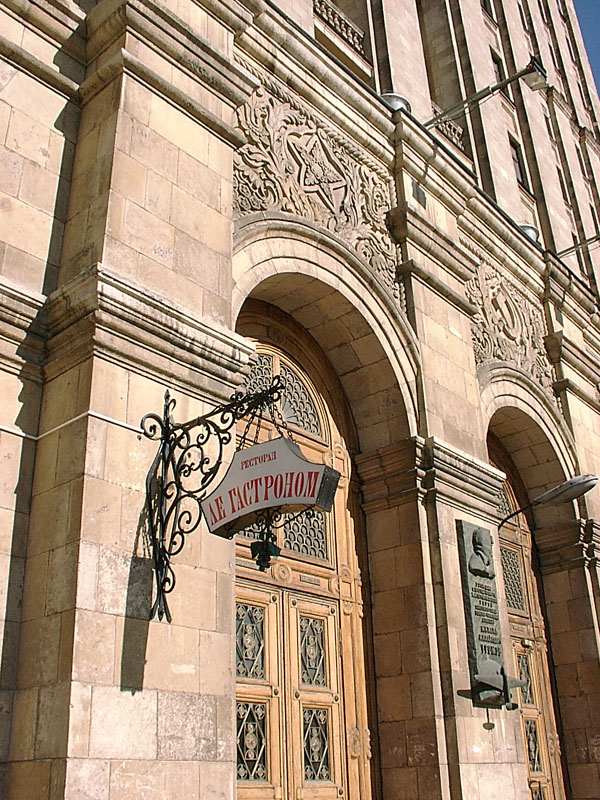
Two doors of the building

== History ==
The skyscraper was laid down in 1950 and completed in 1954. It was the last of the Seven Sisters to be completed.

Its apartments were originally intended for cultural leaders of the former USSR; they are currently inhabited by wealthy Russians.

On August 1, 2026, at a birthday party in the Balzi Rossi restaurant was the site of the 2026 Moscow bombing which killed 5 people and injured 19, including Russian military officials.

== Other projects ==
Media related to Kudrinskaya Square Building at Wikimedia Commons
