= Aleksandr Vlasov (architect) =

Soviet architect (1900–1962)

- Александр Власов
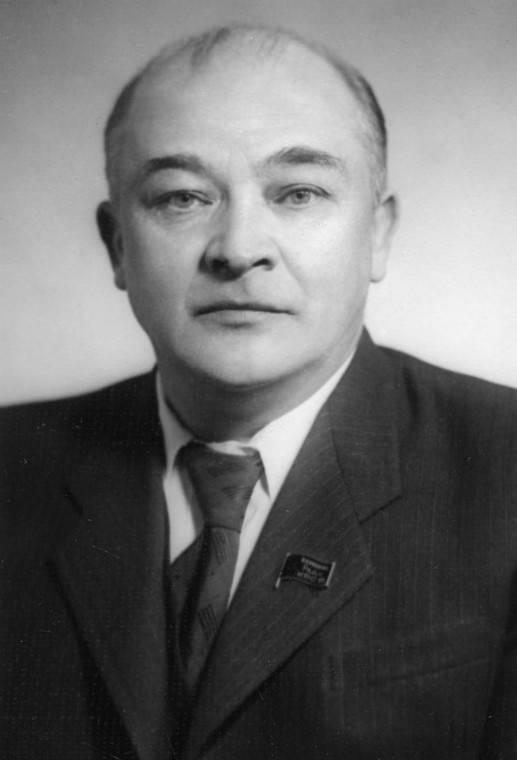
- Born: October 19, 1900
- Died: September 25, 1962 (aged 61); Moscow
- Resting place: Novodevichy Cemetery
- Citizenship: Soviet
- Education: Bauman Moscow State Technical University
- Occupations: Architect, civil engineer
- Projects: Reconstruction of Khreshchatyk street in Kyiv
- Design: Vladimir Lenin monument in Kyiv

Aleksandr Vasilyevich Vlasov (Russian: Александр Васильевич Власов; 19 October 1900 – 25 September 1962) was a Soviet architect. He served as Chief Architect of Kyiv from 1944 to 1950 and Chief Architect of Moscow from 1950 to 1955 as well as President of the USSR Academy of Architecture from 1955 to 1956 and 1st Secretary of the Board of the Union of Architects of the USSR from 1961 to 1962.

== Biography ==
Born in the village of Bolshaya Kosha, Tver Oblast, in the family of a forestry scientist. In 1918 he graduated from the 8th Moscow Gymnasium. His letters to his wife testify to the high level of education received in his youth. During a business trip abroad in 1935–1936, he often referred to examples from the ancient and medieval history of Europe, and sometimes used phrases from the French language in the text.

In 1920 he entered the Moscow Polytechnic Institute at the architectural department (since 1922 - MIGI). Course projects from 1923, completed under the guidance of architect Ilya Golosov, have been preserved: "Passage Hotel with a Restaurant on the Roof" and "Central Station on the City Square". Already in these works one can see the desire of the future architect to design large city buildings with spacious, bright rooms. In 1924, the Faculty of Architecture of MIGI became an administrative unit of the Moscow Higher Technical School, and Aleksandr Vlasov continued his studies at the new university. He received a diploma in Civil engineering only in 1928 and remained to teach at the department. At the same time, in 1931–1932, he lectured at the Institute of Architecture and Construction.

=== Early career ===
In 1929, together with Karo Alabyan, Vladimir Babenkov and Viktor Baburov, he created VOPRA - the All-Russian Association of Proletarian Architects. This organization criticized constructivism and sought to form a new architectural style that would correspond to the political system of the Soviet state. According to the “VOPRA Declaration”, the creation of proletarian architecture is possible if the method of Marxist analysis is used when analyzing the art of past generations. This formulation indicates that VOPRA was a politicized organization.

In 1930–1931, Aleksandr Vlasov participated in a closed competition for the creation of the Leninist Communist University on Vorobyovy Gory. For the first time, he received approval for the construction of a large architectural ensemble in Moscow, and in 1936, according to his design, the first buildings were created - the dormitories of the future institute. However, construction of the complex stopped there. The party leadership did not even approve the seventh version of the project proposed by Vlasov. Over time, the government abandoned the very idea of creating a Leninsky Komvuz on Vorobyovy Gory. The finished buildings were transferred to the All-Union Central Council of Trade Unions.

In 1931, the authorities of the city of Ivanovo announced a competition for the creation of a regional theater - a grandiose structure even by the standards of the capital. The complexity of the project was that a site located on the top of a small hill was allocated for the building. In addition, the Kokuy stream flowed nearby, which could undermine the soil under the foundation. 11 architects took part in the competition. The jury named the best project by Aleksandr Vlasov, who proposed the construction of a multi-level building stylistically close to the Mausoleum. During construction, Ivanovo architects made numerous changes to the original plan to simplify construction. Despite this, several stage venues appeared in it, the two largest of which are the musical and drama theaters with 1464 and 733 seats, respectively.

In 1932, Aleksandr Vlasov headed the architectural workshop No. 2 of Mosproekt, and the following year he completed his teaching career in order to engage exclusively in design and construction. Already in 1934, he submitted his design for the Palace of the Soviets, the most expensive building in the country, to the competition. Although Aleksandr Vlasov did not become the winner in this round, he soon received an order for the reconstruction of the Central Park of Culture and Recreation. Even foreign experts appreciated the implemented plan: Aleksandr Vlasov received the Grand Prix for the Central Park of Culture and Culture project in 1937 at the international exhibition in Paris. In 1935, the architect won the competition to create the Crimean Bridge, which was built under the leadership of engineer Boris Konstantinov in 1938. In 1940, Aleksandr Vlasov was elected corresponding member of the USSR Academy of Architecture.

With the beginning of the Great Patriotic War, the architect, along with other academicians, was evacuated to the city of Shymkent. For several years he developed projects for the restoration of destroyed cities. These developments came in handy after his appointment to the post of chief architect of Kyiv.

=== Restoration of Kyiv ===
In the 1930s and 1940s in the Soviet Union, when designing new and restored destroyed urban ensembles, a concept dating back to the urban planning traditions of the 19th century was used. The central highway became the connecting link of the area, along which local architectural ensembles were created. An exemplary project carried out in accordance with this principle is Khreshchatyk, developed by a group of architects led by Aleksandr Vlasov. In the midst of work in Kyiv, in 1947, Aleksandr Vlasov was elected a full member of the USSR Academy of Architecture.

He ended up in Kyiv where he was offered a job by the first secretary of the Central Committee of the Communist Party of Ukraine, Nikita Khrushchev. Since the capital of the Ukrainian SSR was almost completely destroyed during the Great Patriotic War, architects had the opportunity to rebuild Khreshchatyk. The main result of the street restructuring was a radical expansion - from 35 to 75 meters, with half of the new space allocated for green spaces. The reconstruction of the central part of the city proceeded quite quickly: by the end of 1945, 30 thousand m^{2} of living space had been restored. Nevertheless, the development plan for Khreshchatyk was discussed for a long time, and the construction of the first buildings began only in 1949, shortly before Aleksandr Vlasov left for Moscow.

New Kyiv houses, in accordance with fashion, received rich ornaments. Granite, majolica, and ceramics were used to decorate the facades; on some houses, sculptural groups were installed along the facade[14]. According to an early plan, the building of the Kyiv Executive Committee (building 36) was conceived as an analogue of Stalin's high-rise buildings: 22 floors high, topped with a spire and decorated with groups of workers and collective farmers. However, as a result, a more modest 10-story building was built, which does not stand out among other buildings on Khreshchatyk.

Honorary member of the Ukrainian Academy of Architecture, professor (since 1969) and laureate of the USSR State Prize (1967) Abraham Miletsky wrote:

Aleksandr Vasilyevich Vlasov and the architectural workshops he created (now the Main Directorate of Kievproekt) played a big role in the formation of Kyiv architecture. Small in stature, extremely reserved, in Kyiv he diplomatically and subtly solved the problems of implementing architectural plans... All planning work was carried out under his direct supervision. Having stood the test of time, they still amaze with the originality of the concept and the high quality of its implementation. But this was done in those years when there were ruins of blown-up houses on both sides of the street.

=== Last Moscow works ===
In 1950, Aleksandr Vlasov headed the Department of Architectural Affairs of the Moscow City Executive Committee - the department was responsible for the design of all buildings and structures in the capital. At this time, preparatory work began on the creation of new districts located on the former outskirts of the city. The architects had to not only design individual buildings, but also solve many infrastructural issues: think through the street grid, transport routes, and the location of public organizations. In this regard, on June 2, 1951, the USSR Council of Ministers decided to reorganize the department into the Architectural and Planning Department, the head of which remained Aleksandr Vlasov. In the same year, a new plan for the construction of Moscow until 1960 was approved, according to which large-scale development of territories outside the current Third Ring Road was envisaged.

Already in 1952, under the leadership of Aleksandr Vlasov, for the first time in the history of the USSR, a project for the largest single urban complex was implemented: an area in the southwest of the capital, the main thoroughfare of which was Leninsky Prospekt. 8- and 9-story standard brick houses were erected, the first floors of which were allocated for shops and public buildings. In parallel, infrastructure facilities were built: schools, kindergartens, clinics.

Aleksandr Vlasov still wanted to participate in the creation of exceptional structures. In 1953, he proposed his project for the Pantheon, a memorial complex where prominent figures of the country were supposed to be buried. He, like other architects, used the idea of an ancient temple as a starting point. After changes in government policy that occurred in 1954–1956, the very idea of such a structure lost its meaning. Subsequently, the Soviet government did not return to the idea of the Soviet Pantheon.

In 1954, construction began on the Central Lenin Stadium in Luzhniki. This is the last major project implemented according to the design of Aleksandr Vlasov with the participation of architects Nikolai Ullas and Igor Rozhin. The building became a milestone in the development of domestic architecture. Prefabricated reinforced concrete structures were actively used during construction. The large building has virtually no external decor, which for that time was considered almost a revolutionary approach.

In the summer of 1954, the Moscow City Committee instructed the leadership of the APU and Mosproekt to accelerate the development and construction of standard house designs in Moscow - the period of large-scale development of the capital's outskirts began. As a result, in 1954–1959 alone, and in the South-West alone, 1.5 million m^{2} of living space were put into operation.

With Nikita Khrushchev coming to power in the country, the government's attitude towards architectural style changed. For the new management, it was important to increase the pace of construction while reducing costs. From this point of view, standard buildings devoid of expressive decorative elements became the most profitable. On November 30, 1954, at the "All-Union Meeting of Builders..." that opened in Moscow, Nikita Khrushchev criticized Soviet architecture in recent years. Industry leaders, including Aleksandr Vlasov, were ready for such a statement, so for their part they pointed out the shortcomings of landmark projects of the post-war period. The chief architect of Moscow called it unprincipled to use images borrowed from the design practice of pre-revolutionary apartment buildings as architectural decoration for modern buildings. Aleksandr Vlasov also pointed out the high cost of Moscow skyscrapers. The Leningradskaya Hotel, built according to the design of architects Leonid Polyakov and Aleksandr Boretsky, was recognized as an anti-record. The price of 1 m^{2} of the building cost the state 21,000 rubles. Aleksandr Vlasov laid the blame not on the political leadership of the country, not even on Joseph Stalin personally, but on the architects who made mistakes "in understanding the method of socialist realism".

After this, the so-called "perestroika" period began, when Soviet architects had to develop new methods, both in the construction of individual structures and in the design of standard residential buildings. Since domestic specialists did not have enough experience to quickly solve this problem, major masters went on business trips abroad. In particular, Aleksandr Vlasov went to the USA.

In connection with the changes that have occurred in the industry, the government decided to carry out significant resignations. So in 1955, Aleksandr Vlasov was removed from the post of chief architect of Moscow. Since he knew Nikita Khrushchev even before working in Kyiv, he managed to maintain his influence. Vlasov was even elected president of the USSR Academy of Architecture. On November 4 of the same year, in the Resolution of the Central Committee of the CPSU and the Council of Ministers of the USSR, the former chief architect of Moscow, along with other masters of the Stalin era, was found guilty of a passion for external decoration, which led to irrational spending of budget funds. However, even after this, Aleksandr Vlasov continued his professional activities, and at the II All-Union Congress of Architects in November 1955, he was elected a member of the presidium of the Union of Architects of the USSR. The following year, the Soviet government reorganized the departmental academy, which received a new name - the Academy of Construction and Architecture. Since architecture was formally recognized as secondary to construction, Vlasov took the post of vice president in the new institution.

In the fall of 1956, the Soviet government announced a new competition for the construction of the Palace of the Soviets. In parallel, an open part of the competition was held, where all construction teams in the country could participate, and a closed part, in which only the country's leading architects submitted applications. Aleksandr Vlasov participated in the first closed competition, and in 1958 in the second. His project received special praise. The highlight of the building was to be a large winter garden, which was proposed to be created in the central part of the complex.

We sought to implement the idea of space in the building of the Palace of Soviets in a new way. For the climate of Moscow, where nature is stingy and dead for 6–7 months a year, the introduction of living nature inside the building in the form of a blooming garden seems interesting; it imparts a new quality to the entire building

.

And although a commission of public referents, created in 1958, headed by Yuri Yaralov, recognized his idea as the best of those proposed, according to critics, not a single concept fully corresponded to the image of the Palace of Soviets. The decision to construct the building was postponed. In 1960, the Office for the Design of the Palace of Soviets was created, headed by Aleksandr Vlasov. However, construction never began.

Shortly before his death, Aleksandr Vlasov was elected first secretary of the Union of Architects of the USSR. He died on September 25, 1962, and was buried in Moscow at the Novodevichy Cemetery.

Political offices
Preceded by Dmitry Chechulin	Chief Architect of Moscow; 1949—1955	Succeeded by Iosif Loveyko
