= State Kremlin Palace =

Building inside the Kremlin, originally built for Soviet Communist Party meetings

Coordinates: 55°45′5″N 37°36′56″E

- Государственный Кремлёвский дворец
- Kremlin Palace of Congresses
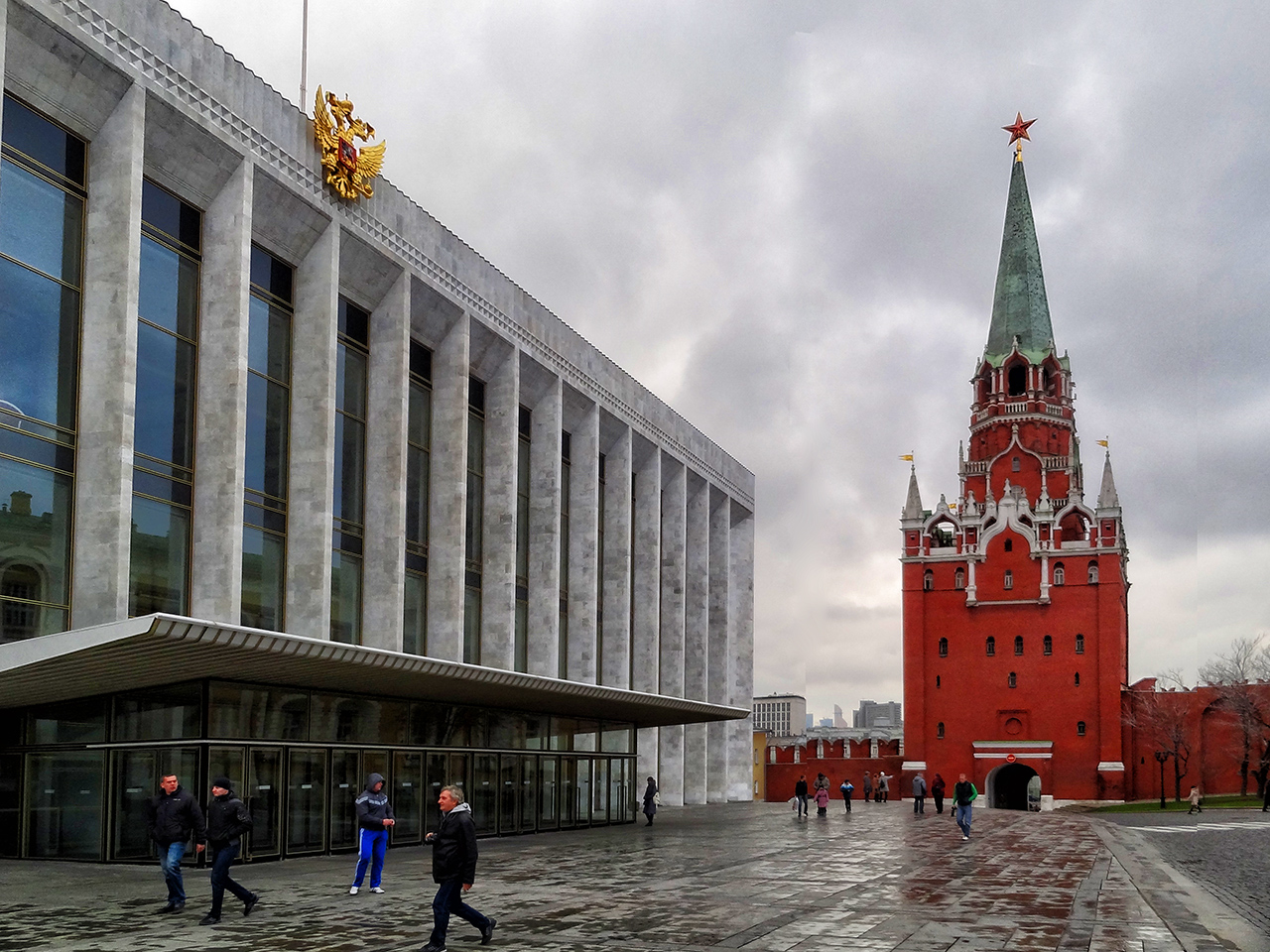
- Interactive map of State Kremlin Palace
- Address: Vosdvizhenka str. 1 Moscow 121019; Russia
- Capacity: 6,000
- Production: Zarkana; Kremlin Ballet

Construction
- Opened: 17 October 1961
- Architects: Mikhail Posokhin, Ashot Mndoyants and Eugene Stamo

Website
- Venue Website

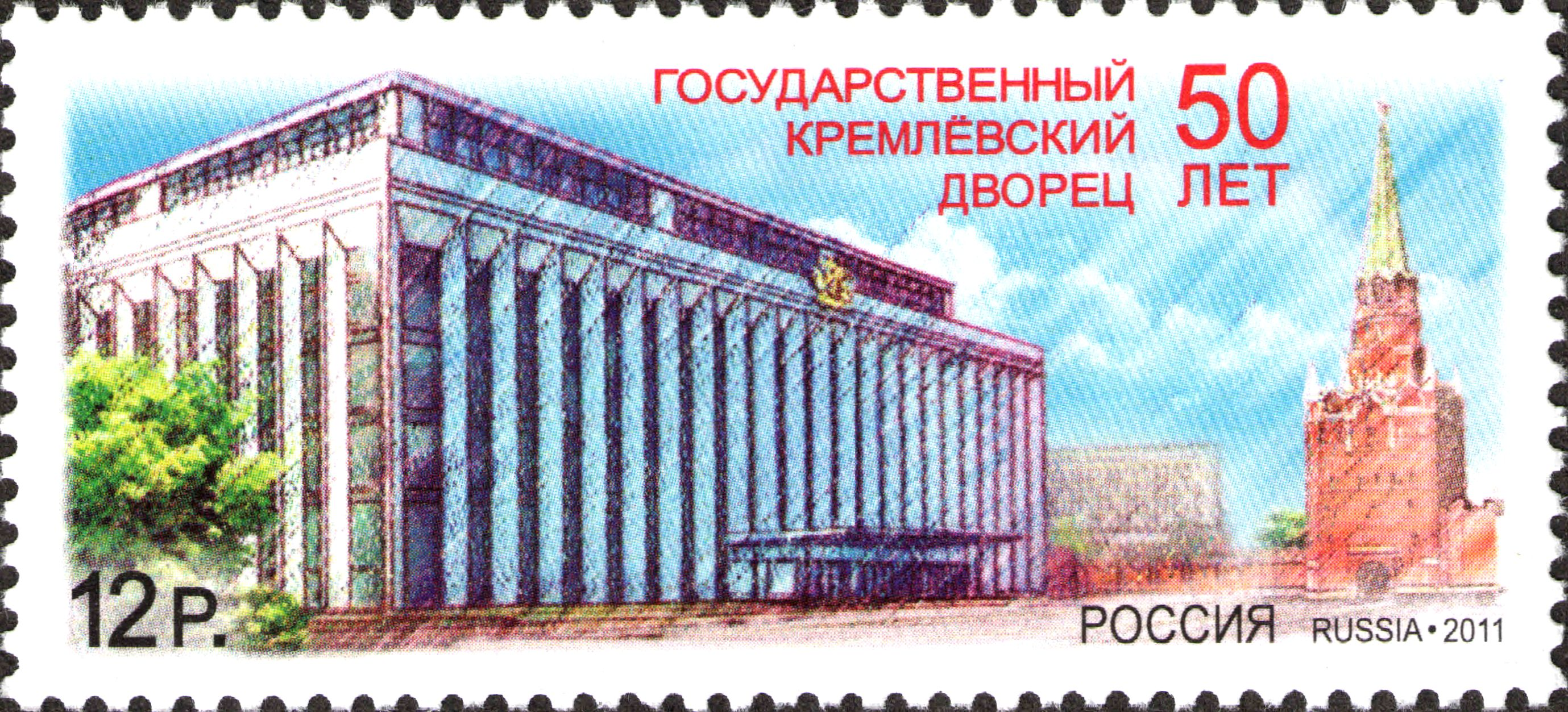
State Kremlin Palace on a Russian stamp, 50-year jubilee

The State Kremlin Palace (Russian: Государственный Кремлёвский дворец), previously and unofficially known as the Kremlin Palace of Congresses (Кремлёвский дворец съездов), is a large modern building inside the Moscow Kremlin.

== History ==
The building was built at the initiative of Nikita Khrushchev as a modern arena for Communist Party meetings. The building replaced several heritage buildings, including the old neo-classical building of the State Armoury, and some of the back corpuses of the Great Kremlin Palace. This, and that the architecture of the projected building contrasted with the historic milieu resulted in quite an uproar, particularly after other historic buildings of the Kremlin, such as the Chudov and Ascension cloisters, had already been demolished during the Stalin era and laws, that were introduced by the mid-1950s, prohibited the demolition of historic structures, making the construction in some ways illegal.

The construction work started in 1959 and the building was opened along with the 22nd Congress of the Communist Party of the Soviet Union on October 17, 1961. Over the years this was the main place for mass state events (particularly party congresses).

Presently it is used for official and popular concerts. American singers Mariah Carey, Tina Turner and Cher have played in the palace, as did Norwegian band A-HA and Canadian poet and singer-songwriter Leonard Cohen.

== Architecture ==
The building is a modern glass and concrete design, with nearly half of it (17 metres) submerged underground. Externally the palace is faced with white marble and the windows are tinted and reflective, which makes the classic architecture in the Kremlin appear particularly picturesque.

The palace was subsequently integrated into the larger complex of the Great Kremlin Palace.

== Architecture and interiors ==
The State Kremlin Palace was designed in the style of Soviet modernism, which marked a departure from Stalinist architecture. The building is characterised by stylistic integrity and monumentality. As the researchers note, its "three-dimensional composition, the architectural solution of the facades and the state interiors are closely linked". The palace has a rectangular shape and a volume of about 40,000 m³. It has over 800 rooms. The central part of the building is occupied by an auditorium (in Soviet times, a conference hall) for 6,000 seats.

Architectural historian Andrey Ikonnikov notes the openness of the internal layout of the palace and its interiors. In his view, the gradual transitions between the foyer and the lobbies employed the principle of "shimmering construction of space", which symbolised continuity with the architectural experiments of the Soviet avant-garde of the 1920s.

The building's exterior combines vertical protrusions with mirrored openings between them. The façades are clad in white Ural marble and anodised aluminium. Red Karbakhta granite, Koelga marble and patterned Baku tuff, and various types of wood were used inside. A gilded emblem of the USSR, made by sculptor Alexei Zelenski, was located above the main entrance. The symbol was later replaced by the coat of arms of the Russian Federation. The interior decoration of the palace was done by the artist Alexander Deineka, who made mosaic emblems in the banquet hall and the frieze in the foyer.

== Party congresses in the Kremlin Palace ==
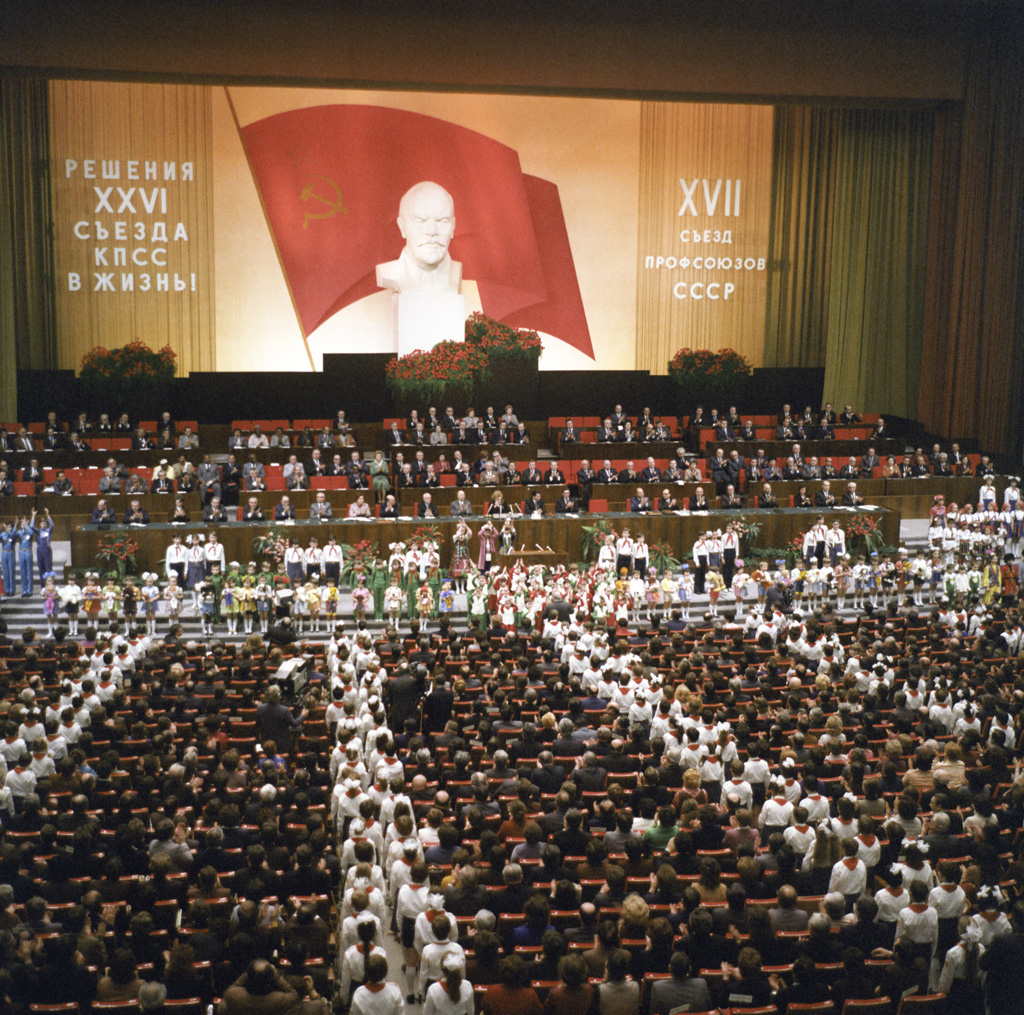
XVII Congress of the Soviet state-controlled trade unions,
19 March 1982.

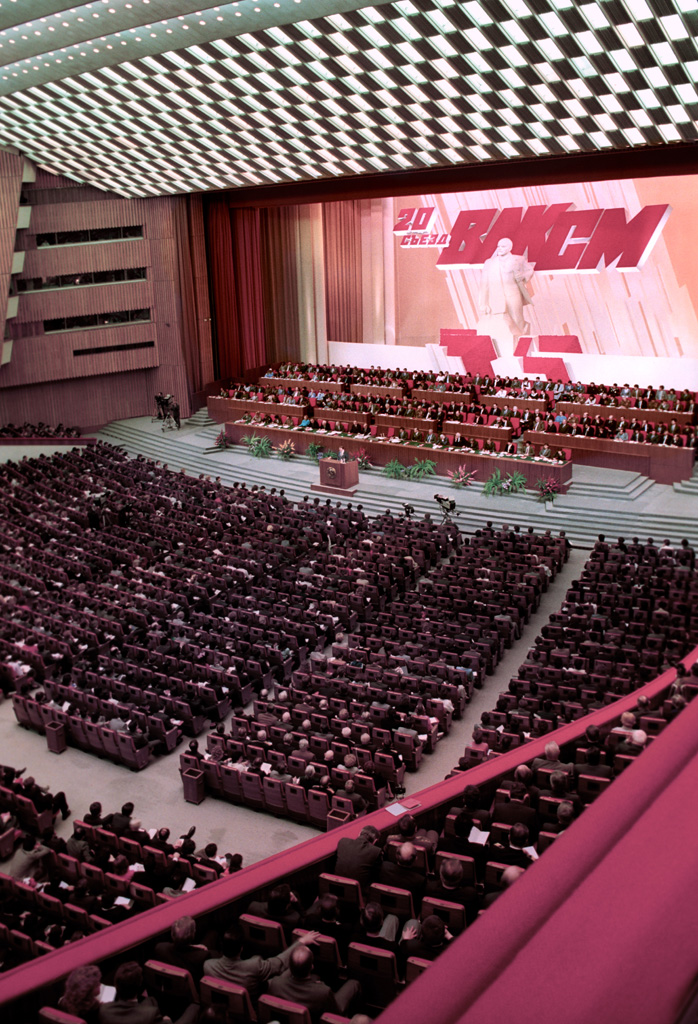
20th Congress of the Komsomol,
1 February 1987.

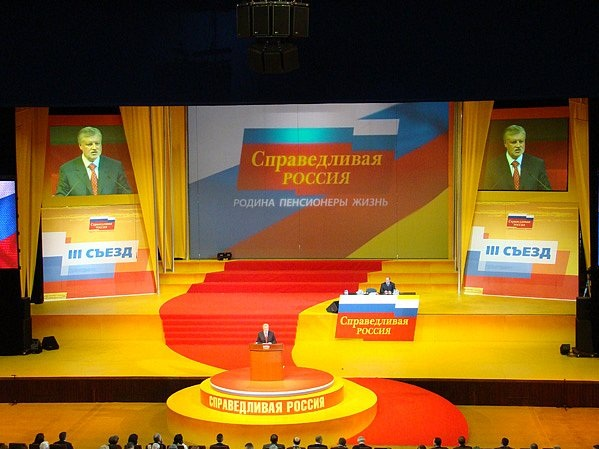
Sergey Mironov
on 3 Congress of the party A Just Russia.
25 April 2008.

== In popular culture ==
In Tom Clancy's 1986 novel Red Storm Rising, the building is bombed in a false-flag operation by the KGB to justify an invasion of Western Europe, with West Germany being framed for the attack. The building is depicted as being the meeting place for the Council of Ministers. Ordinarily, the Council convened in the Kremlin Senate, which is explained in the novel as being closed for repairs.

== See also ==
- Congress of the Communist Party of the Soviet Union
- Palace of the Republic
- House of the Unions
- Palace of the Soviets
