= Soviet architecture =

Soviet architecture usually refers to one of four architecture styles emblematic of the Soviet Union:

- Constructivist architecture, prominent in the 1920s and early 1930s
- Stalinist architecture, prominent in the 1930s through 1950s
- Brutalist architecture, prominent style in the 1950s through 1980s
- Soviet architectural modernism, architectural trend of the USSR from 1955-1991
