= Christopher Herwig =

Canadian photographer

Christopher Herwig is a Canadian photographer and filmmaker primarily known for his photographs of vernacular architecture, in particular Soviet bus stops. Herwig has spent 15 years travelling throughout the countries of the former USSR to document hundreds of sculptural bus stop shelters created by local artists and builders.

== Work ==
Herwig published the book, Soviet Bus Stops in 2015. He began the series in 2002, and covered 18,000 miles during his photographic journeys, including Ukraine, Latvia, Estonia, Georgia, Armenia, Belarus, Kyrgyzstan, Moldova, Uzbekistan, Tajikistan, Turkmenistan, Kazakhstan, the disputed region of Abkhazia and other countries. Claire Voon wrote in Hyperallergic, that the project is "as much an endeavor to immortalize these gradually disappearing architectural gems as it is a means to showcase the creative voices of individuals who live in the Soviet Union. Herwig began the project in 2002 on bicycle, he found that the more he rode through the former Soviet landscapes, the more he came across artistically designed, unusual, and sometimes spaceship-like bus stops. He was struck by the creativity and diversity of designs and structures.

Herwig eventually covered 30,000 km through 14 countries to capture images of these structures. Most of the bus stops were built in the 1960s and 70s. He found that the most interesting bus stops were in the country side and in smaller towns.

A second volume of Soviet Bus Stops was published in 2017. Alexi Dushkin has stated that Moscow's grand metro stations are "palaces for the people", whereas Cassio de Oliveira has written that the humble bus stops are "gazebos for the people" where the locals could find partial shelter in the out-of-doors in structures that "somewhat improvised civic centers, where Soviet citizens would take in the scenery—invariably Soviet, notwithstanding the diversity of landscapes—and wait". He goes on to write that "The bus stops, derelict and useless as they may appear through Herwig’s lens, stand as eerily lonely memorials to such a collectivist impetus."

Other photographic projects of Herwig have included trips through Asia and Africa. He has collaborated with UNICEF and National Geographic.

== Documentary film ==
In 2022, a documentary film, on Herwig's photographic project, titled Soviet Bus Stops, premiered at the Vancouver International Film Festival. The 56 minute film was directed by Kristoffer Hegnsvad.
