= Vologda wooden architecture =

Vologda wooden architecture (Russian: Вологодское деревянное зодчество) is a set of styles and trends in the wooden architecture of Vologda, an ensemble of wooden mansions of the late 18th - first quarter of the 20th century.

Vologda has a well-preserved, rich and original heritage of Russian urban wooden architecture. By the beginning of the 21st century, there were from 105 to 170 wooden architectural monuments in Vologda. All the main types of wooden mansions of the 19th - early 20th centuries are represented in Vologda - noble, merchant and bourgeois, and among the architectural styles - classicism, empire and modern.

A special type of wooden house, the so-called "Vologda type", developed in the city at the end of the 19th - beginning of the 20th century - a two-story mansion, in shape - a parallelepiped, elongated into the courtyard with a corner loggia above the porch.

== History ==
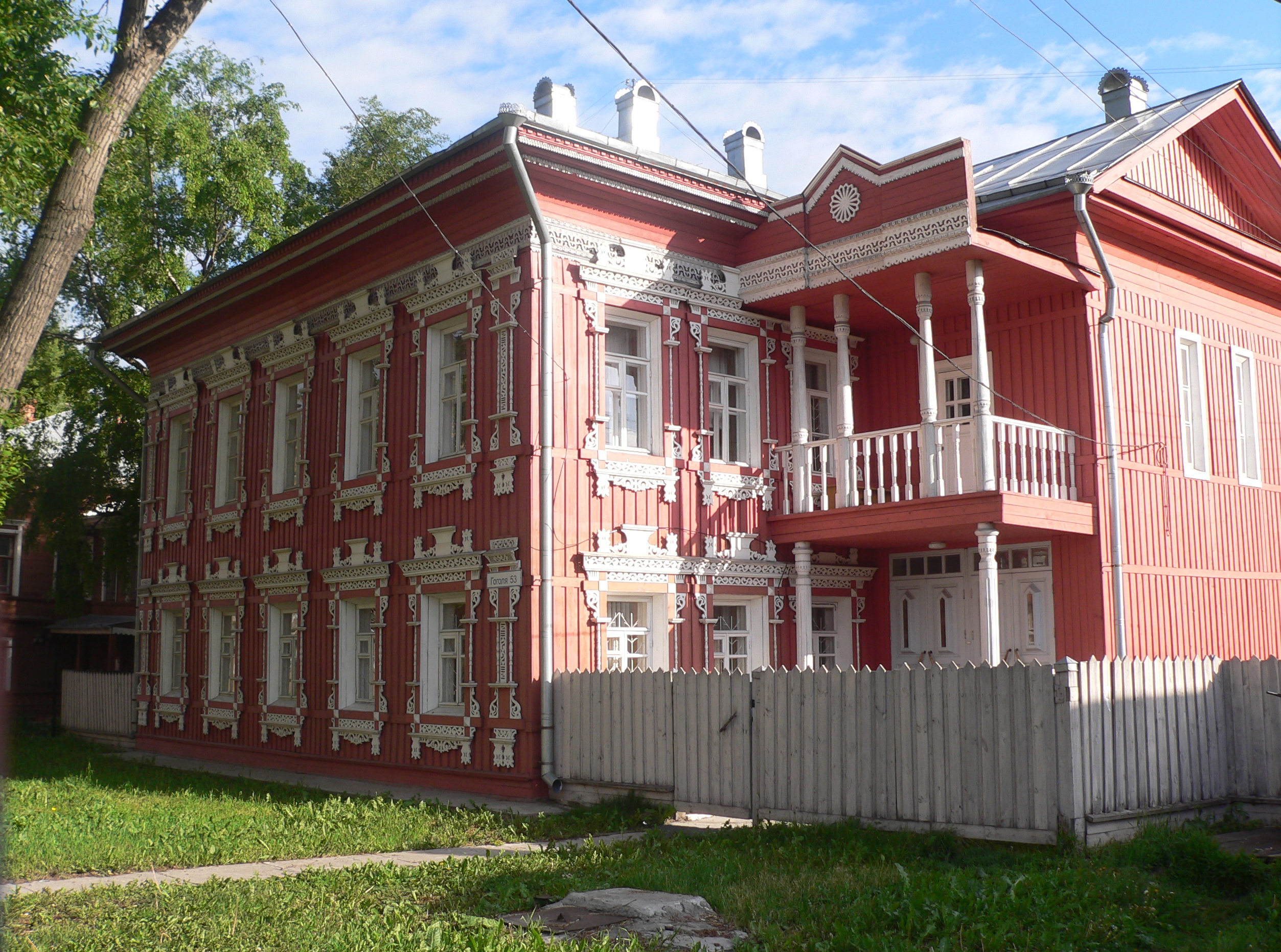
Wooden house of the "Vologda type" of 1895 after restoration

Until the beginning of the 18th century, almost all buildings in Vologda were wooden. Only churches were built of stone, with the exception of several surviving stone civil buildings (the Goutman House, better known as the House of Peter I, and the chambers of the Bishop's Court). Wooden construction was also prevalent later, until the mid-18th century, during the period of Peter I's decree from 1714 to 1722, which prohibited any stone construction in the country, except for St. Petersburg. Wooden buildings were residential mansions - usually a one-story log house on a high basement, with a steep roof. The house was located inside the courtyard, and fences and walls of outbuildings (services) faced the street: stables, sheds, coach houses.

The Vologda residential building, the appearance of which was reconstructed according to the building register of 1684, was close in its architecture to the mansions of the Russian North and lacked the features characteristic of Vologda wooden architecture. Judging by the text of the Census Book of 1711, along with single-story houses, there were many two-story (and even three-story) buildings in Vologda, and not only residential buildings but also outbuildings could be two-story. The upper tier of residential buildings was occupied by rooms designated by the words izba, gorenka, svetlitsa, senii, klet (kletka), komnata, on the lower tier there was a podklet, a residential podklet, podyzbitsa, anbar, pogreb.

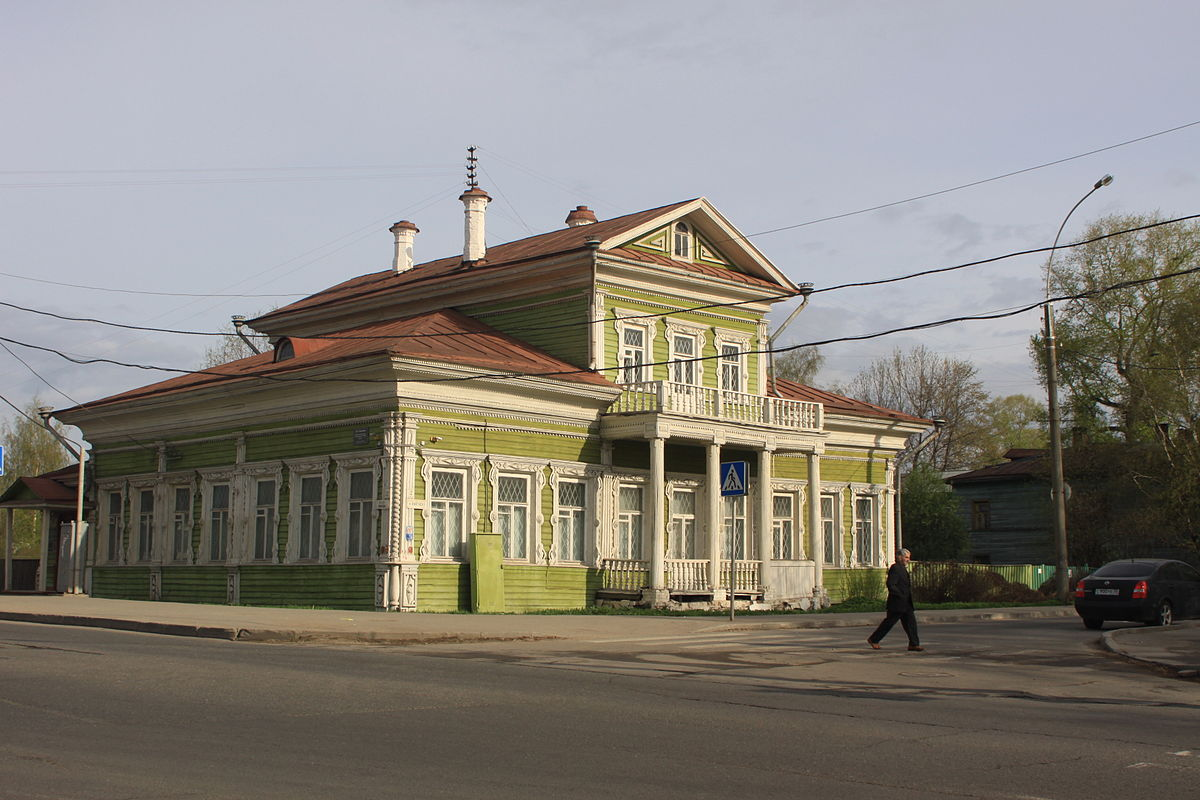
Zasetsky House

A new stage in the development of Vologda's urban development began at the end of the 18th century, after the adoption of the first general plan of the city in 1781 with a new grid of straight streets and the construction of houses along the red line according to model projects. The renovation of the old buildings was facilitated by the devastating fire of 1773 and the flood of 1779. Both stone and wooden houses were built according to model projects. The wooden buildings of the city were significantly diluted with stone buildings in the 1770-1780s, during the heyday of Vologda, associated with the formation of the Vologda Governorate and viceroyalty. By the beginning of the 19th century, stone construction in Vologda died out due to the decline in the city's economy.

In the 19th century, black huts still remained in the city. There were no stoves in the black huts; they were replaced by a hearth. The government order to remove black huts and install stoves with chimneys in houses was issued in 1842. In 1882, there were 1,806 wooden and 125 stone houses in Vologda.

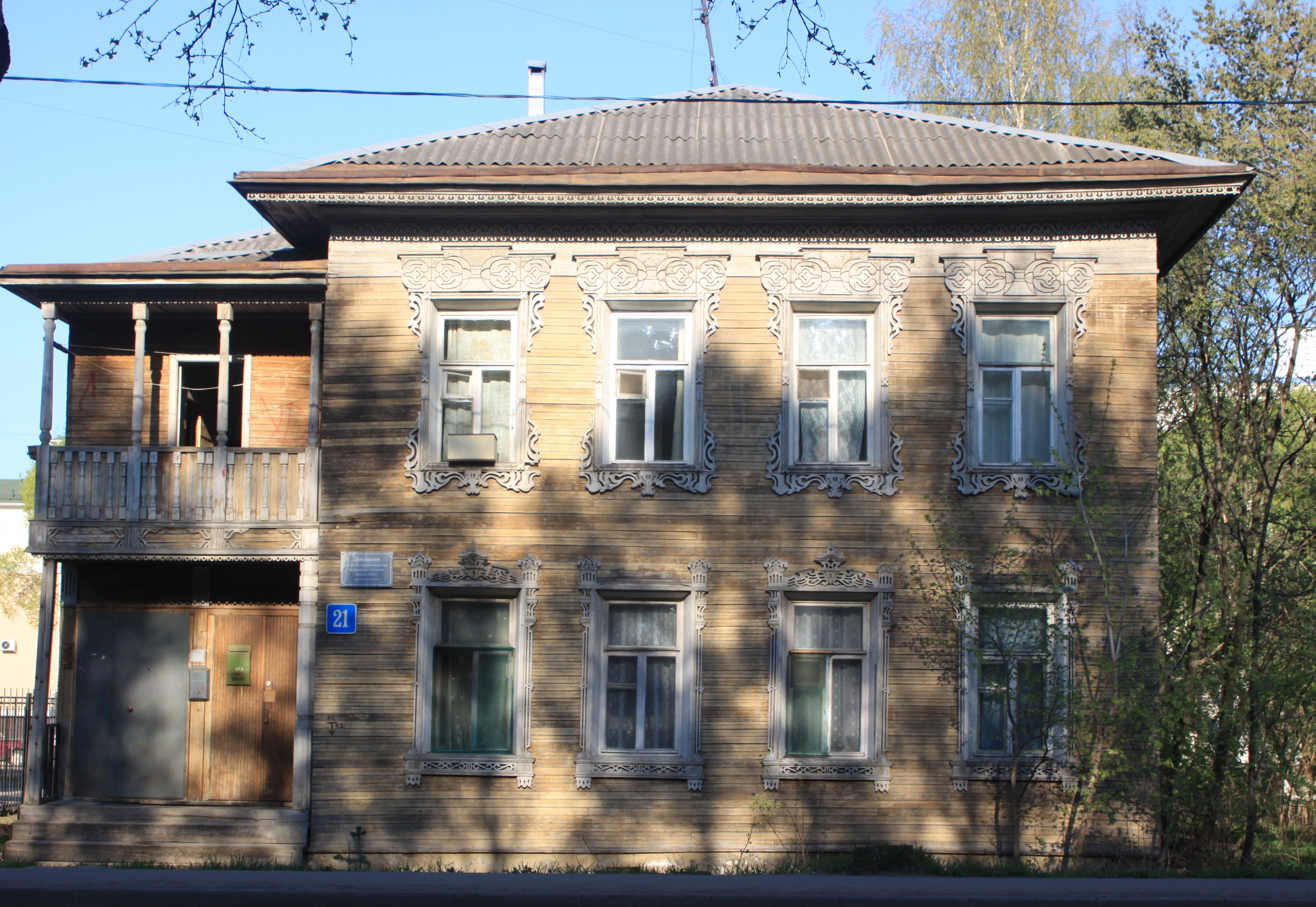
House with a balcony and an entrance from the street, late 19th – early 20th century.

In his book “There is only one such city in Russia,” writer Sazonov names the house on Burmaginykh Street, 38, as the oldest surviving wooden monument, which he dates to the mid-18th century. However, M. V. Kanin, in his article “The Riddle of the Old House,” refutes the dating of the house to the 18th century, proving that the house was built at the very beginning of the 19th century. Probably, the oldest surviving wooden building in Vologda is the Zasetsky house, built in the 1790s.

=== Wooden architecture of the 18th - mid-19th centuries ===
==== Noble houses ====
Since the 18th century, wooden architecture in Vologda has been developing according to the stylistic trends most characteristic of the stone architecture of that time. Noble houses and estates were built mainly in the classical style, many of them according to model projects. In such wooden houses, a four-, six- or eight-column portico on the main façade was an obligatory element. The front porch faced the courtyard.

Noble estates were grouped in the city according to class, mainly along Peterburgskaya (modern Leningradskaya), Bolshaya Dvoryanskaya (modern Oktyabrskaya) and Yekaterininsko-Dvoryanskaya streets (modern Herzen street). A coach house was built in the courtyard of the estate. The outstanding monuments of classicism in Vologda wooden architecture include the Levashov house, the Zasetsky house and the Volkov house.

==== Merchant houses ====
Merchant houses of the first half of the 19th century did not have pediment porticoes, their feature was the presence of a mezzanine, however, the classical composition with the corresponding decorative elements continued to be used. An example of such a building is the former Sokovikov house. In this mansion with mezzanines and a front porch from the yard, the division of the house into two almost completely isolated apartments by floors is already outlined, which anticipates the formation of the so-called "Vologda type" houses that are characteristic of the wooden architecture of the city. Two floors in such houses are united only by a common entrance and stairs taken out into the extensions.

==== Bourgeois houses ====
Houses for the bourgeoisie were built mainly one-story, with a facade of three windows. The windows were recessed into arched niches, wooden rosettes or inserts in the form of an unfolded fan were placed in the tympanums. A mezzanine or a cross-shaped mezzanine overlooked the side facades. The mezzanine floor allowed the customer of the house to significantly increase the usable area of the dwelling without violating the requirements of the “model facade” and the building regulations. Such houses have a complete volumetric-spatial solution.

=== Second half of the 19th century - early 20th century ===
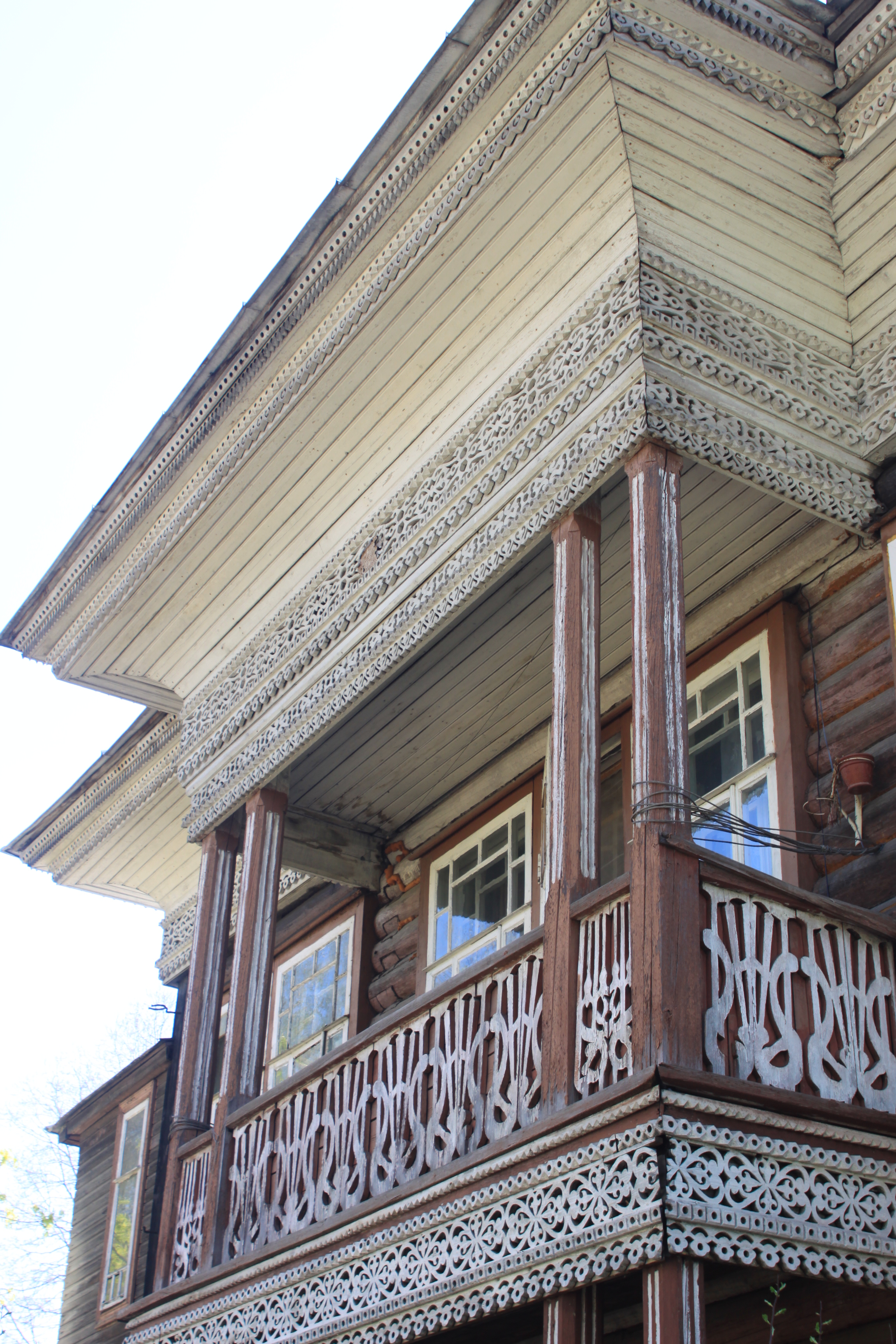
Saw-cut carving in the decor of the balcony and cornice. Vorobyov House (Zasodimsky Street, 14)

Since the middle of the 19th century, the traditional type of house for wooden architecture of Vologda has been formed - a two-story mansion, close to a cube in shape and extended into the courtyard. A mandatory element is a balcony-loggia, under which there is a porch and a staircase with separate entrances to apartments on the first and second floors. The entrance to the house, unlike houses of an earlier period, is located from the street. Depending on the size of the house, there were one or more apartments on each floor. In these houses, saw-cut carving is often used to decorate cornices, porches, balconies, and platbands.

To protect the house structures from water flowing down from the roof, the houses have a significantly extended cornice, often of a plastic shape, reminiscent of a fall in ancient Russian wooden architecture. Houses located in fire-hazardous proximity to each other were equipped with firewalls.

By the end of the 19th century, in Vologda, as in many other provincial cities, traces of local features were erased in the architecture of stone buildings. But Vologda wooden houses built at the turn of the last and current centuries are distinguished by their distinctly distinctive features.

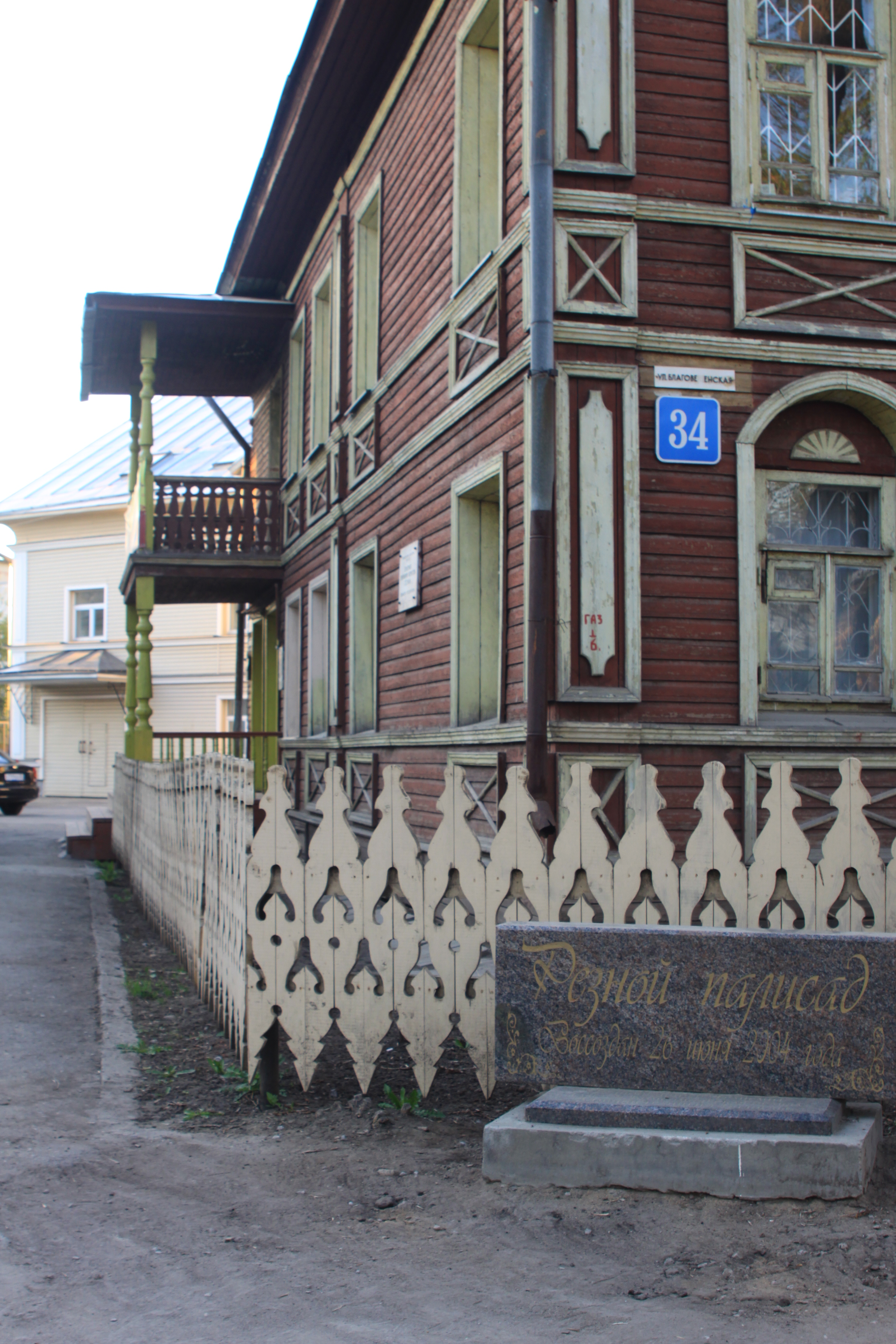
The reconstructed carved palisade and memorial sign on Blagoveshchenskaya Street

By the end of the 19th century, wooden apartment buildings began to appear in Vologda. As a rule, such a house is stretched along the main façade, with a balcony in the center or along the edges. Well-preserved examples of such buildings are the Samarin House and the house on Pobedy Avenue, 32.

The period of Art Nouveau architecture was expressed in the appearance of wooden houses in Vologda using new compositional techniques: lengthening the façade along the street, the appearance of turret-shaped ends, and also increasing the height of the house due to window openings.

=== Soviet period ===
The construction of wooden mansions ceased after 1917. However, wood remained the main building material until the mid-20th century. An outstanding monument of wooden architecture of this period is the Railway Workers' Palace of Culture, built in 1927 with elements of the Art Nouveau style.

The main type of building in the second quarter of the 20th century is a wooden barrack. Elements of constructivism are found in buildings constructed during this period. An example of a complex development of wooden houses with elements of this style is the Flax Plant settlement (1930-1940s).

== Structural elements and decor ==
=== Structure of a wooden house ===
The basis of the structural scheme of a wooden house was a log structure, built from crowns "in oblo", with windows recessed in relation to the facade. In Vologda, residential buildings were rarely left in the form of an open log structure - as a rule, they were sheathed with boards, which were then covered with drying oil in two layers; wood treated in this way acquired a grayish tint over time. Wooden log houses were built on pillar or solid stone foundations. Tarred birch bark was often laid for thermal insulation.

Wooden houses, regardless of the wealth of the owner and class affiliation, were built on estate plots. Outbuildings were located in the yard, the rest of the estate was made up of a vegetable garden and a garden.

=== Decor ===
The decor of the house could use both traditional platbands and complex ornaments in the Art Nouveau style. Art Nouveau in house decor was expressed in the decoration of balconies with flowing folds, valances in the form of hanging tassels, cut lilies, animals, flowers. The corners of the facade were decorated with flat carved patterns, often enclosed in a frame. The decoration of the elements of the house was not excessive. Carved decorations were made mainly by saw-cut carving. It was used to decorate cornices, porches, balconies, door frames, carved attics and sometimes decorative pediments. Exceptions with blind and volumetric carving are few. Volumetric carving was more often used to decorate doors. The window frames on the first floor often ended in a semicircle, while on the second floor they were rectangular. A rosette or stylized crown was placed in the niche of the semicircle.

==== Carved palisade ====
A palisade is a picket fence framing a front garden in front of a house. Trees, decorative bushes and flowers were planted in the front garden. Palisades are not quite typical for Vologda, but they were found near many houses up until the 1960s - 1980s, when most of them were lost during the widening of streets. The Vologda carved palisade became famous thanks to the song "Vologda" by the group "Pesnyary".

=== Gates ===
All Vologda wooden houses had internal fenced courtyards, into which the gates led. The central part of the gate, consisting of two leaves, was intended for passage. On the left and (or) on the right there were wickets for passage.

== Current status and conservation issues ==
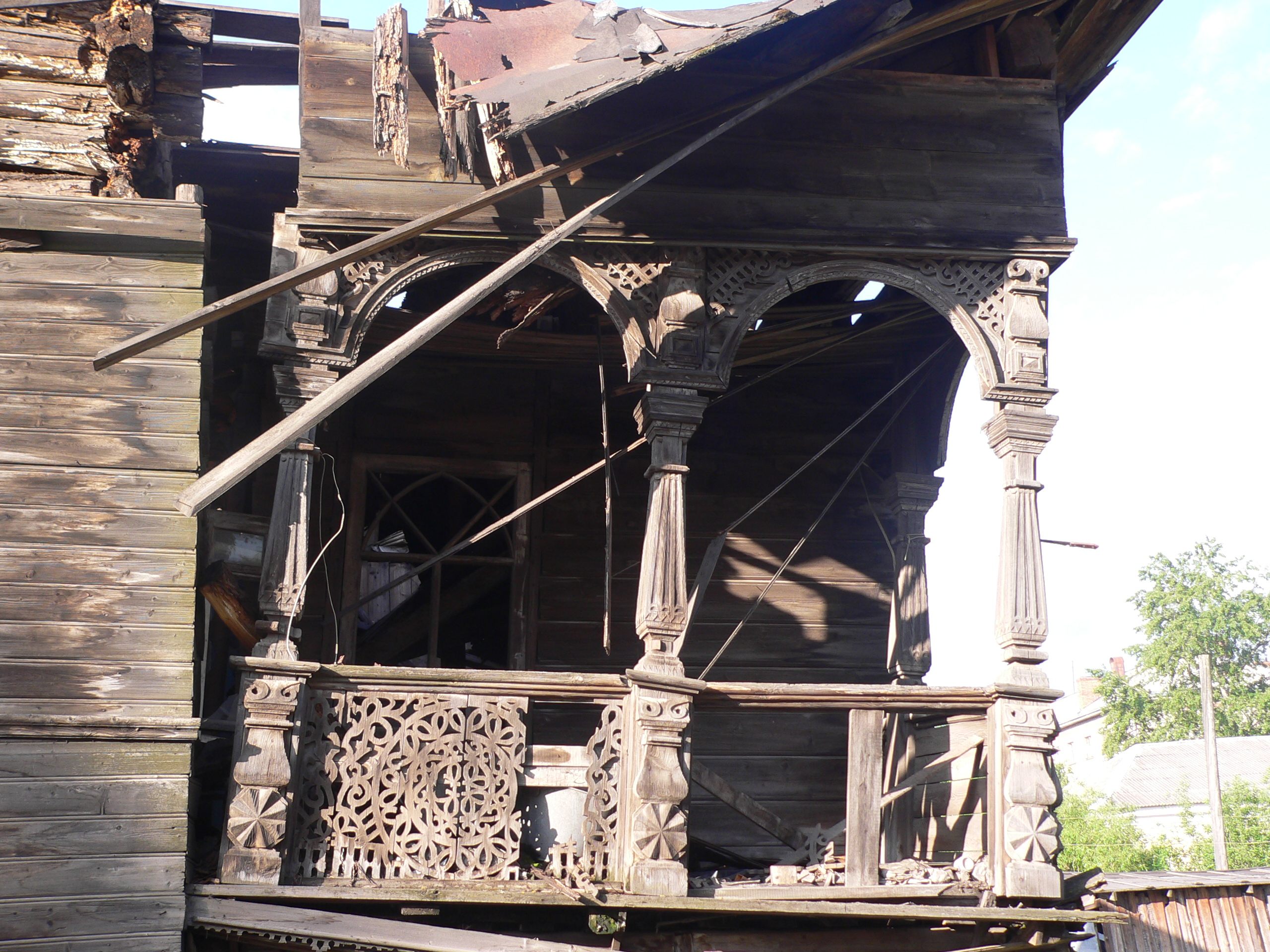
A third of wooden architecture monuments in Vologda have been lost.

Of the 115 historical cities of Russia, only 16 have monuments of wooden architecture. Along with Vologda, Tomsk is usually singled out, and to a lesser extent, Arzamas.

Since the early 1970s, after Vologda was included in the list of historical cities, the Central Research Institute of Urban Development has been working on the protection of its historical heritage. In the late 1980s, a new project for monument protection zones was approved. On June 26, 2009, the Rules for Land Use and Development were approved, which include zones for the protection of historical and cultural monuments In the 1990s and 2000s, many monuments were affected by illegal or unjustified demolition. According to data for 2005, out of 105 monuments, 25 were completely lost, 4 were partially lost, and 4 were in a state of emergency. 10 objects were distorted by alterations. 26 objects were restored. According to data for the beginning of 2010, there are 155 objects on the list of wooden architectural monuments of Vologda.

Of particular concern in Vologda and other cities are residential wooden houses on the balance sheet of the housing and communal services of municipal entities, many of which require major repairs, but are not being repaired. The buildings reach a state where repairs become impossible.

A serious problem is the preservation of not only individual monuments, but also the entire historical and architectural environment, which is an integral part of Vologda as a historical city:

In a historical settlement, all historically valuable city-forming objects are subject to state protection: layout, development, composition, natural landscape, archaeological layer, the relationship between various urban spaces (free, built-up, green), volumetric and spatial structure, fragmentary and ruined urban heritage, the form and appearance of buildings and structures united by scale, volume, structure, style, materials, color and decorative elements, the relationship with the natural and man-made environment, various functions of the historical settlement acquired by it in the process of development, as well as other valuable objects.

Despite the protection of the law, state protection is ineffective, and the integrity of the ensemble of wooden architecture of Vologda is continuously destroyed. In the 1990-2000s, replacement development of the city center in the style of "historicism" is underway. Many projects are imitations of monuments, made of brick structures, covered with wood or materials imitating it, creating an external resemblance to the facade of the lost monument.
