= General Plan for the Reconstruction of Moscow =

1935 plan by Vladimir Semyonov and Sergey Chernyshyov

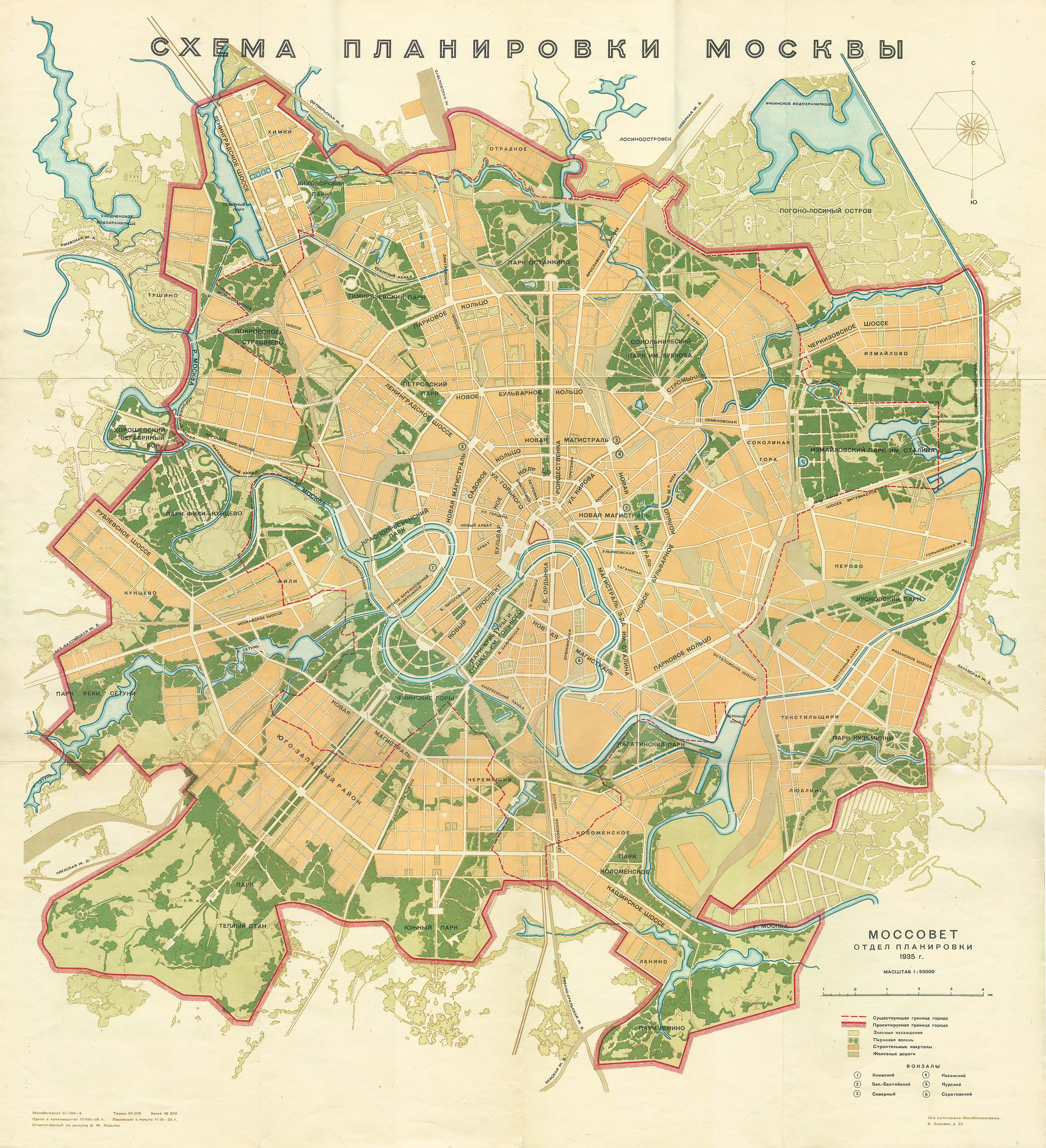
Moscow General Plan of 1935

General plan for the reconstruction of Moscow (Russian: Генеральный план реконструкции Москвы), also known as 1935 Moscow General Plan, was the first comprehensive master plan for the reconstruction of Moscow, in which the historically established radial-ring structure of the city was combined with the development of new areas, the creation of ring and radial highways. It was developed under the guidance of architects Vladimir Semyonov and Sergey Chernyshyov. It was approved on July 10, 1935, by resolution of the Central Committee of the All-Union Communist Party of Bolsheviks and the Council of People's Commissars of the Soviet Union No. 1435 "On the master plan for the reconstruction of the city of Moscow". The plan served as the basis for Stalinist reconstruction of Moscow. It included an innovative plan for watering the city of Moscow, following the example of Leningrad.

== History ==
=== Background ===
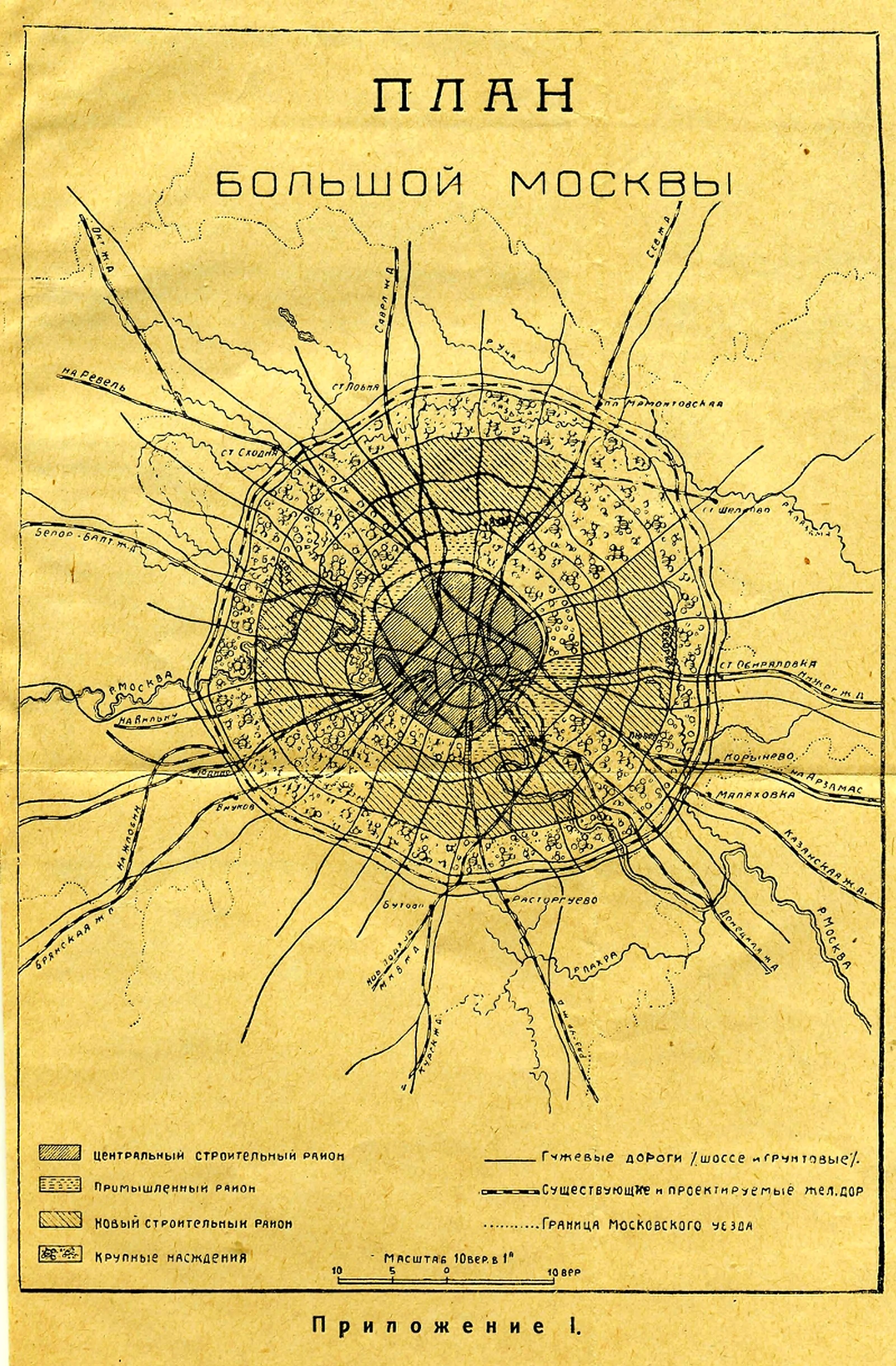
Greater Moscow plan of 1925

Immediately after the October Revolution, projects for cities of the future were created, and proposals were made for the reconstruction of Petrograd and Moscow. The first reconstruction plan, "City of the Future", was drawn up in 1918 by Professor Boris Sakulin. The plan covered the cities of the Moscow Oblast and provided for group resettlement. However, the project was unfeasible, since it involved the reconstruction of life on too large an area, comparable to a small state.

In 1918, city officials established two competing planning groups. The Mossoviet workshop under the leadership of Ivan Zholtovsky (later management of the project passed to Alexey Shchusev) was primarily concerned with the development of the old city, and S.S. Shestakov's group was concerned with the problems of the working outskirts. The "New Moscow" plan proposed by Shchusev in 1923-1924 was based on the radial-ring layout traditional for Moscow. The government center moved to the area of Petrovsky Park and Khodynka Field. The Moscow Kremlin was freed from administrative and residential functions and in the future turned into a museum. The medium-term population forecast was limited to two million people, so the city's development area was limited to the Little Ring of the Moscow Railway, and new development was predominantly low-rise. The outskirts of Moscow were to develop as a single garden city.

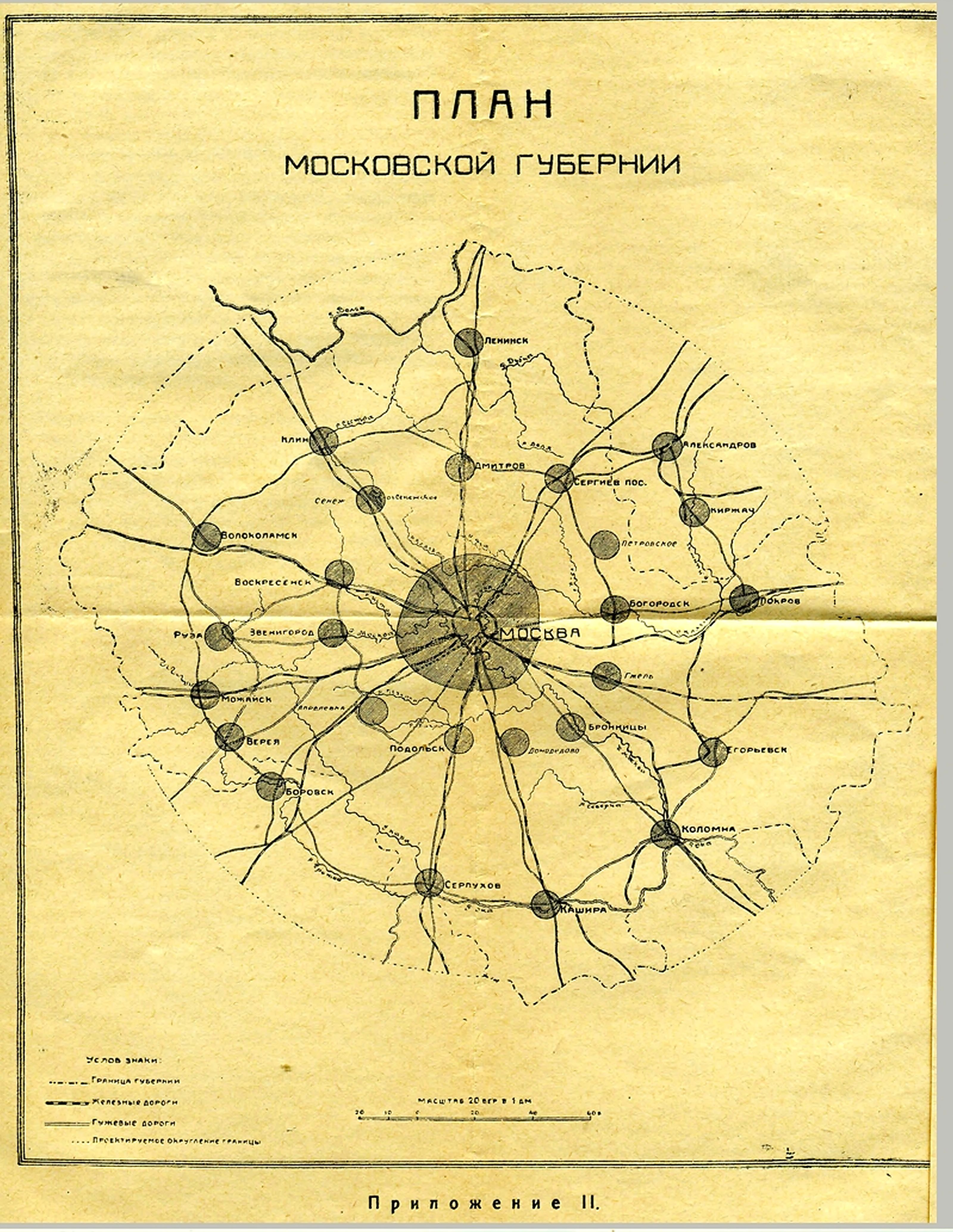
Plan of the Moscow Governorate created by Shestakov

The New Moscow project had a completely different focus than the Stalinist master plan for the reconstruction of the capital of 1935, which is often incorrectly described as a development of Shchusev's ideas. Shchusev moved the administrative center to the Leningradsky Avenue, and according to the general plan of 1935, it was fundamentally superimposed on the historical center. Shchusev was in favor of identifying the best ancient buildings (his employees examined the city while working in the commission for the protection of monuments of the Mossoviet), while during the implementation of the general plan of 1935, many historical buildings and neighborhoods were demolished. The Moscow administration, disagreeing with Shchusev's opinion, was already inclined in 1924 in favor of Shestakov's "Greater Moscow" plan; in 1925, Shchusev's stubbornness became no longer tolerable, and he was removed, and the development of “New Moscow” was curtailed.

The Greater Moscow project was developed in 1921–1925 by Sergey Shestakov. According to the plan, the historical core of the city was surrounded by a system of three rings. However, the authorities abandoned the implementation plan in 1929, and Shestakov himself was repressed.

=== Competition entries ===
The end of the 1920s and the beginning of the 1930s was a time of heated discussions about the principles of socialist resettlement, types of housing, ways of developing the future Moscow, and the future of the Soviet people.

In 1930, two plans for the development of Moscow appeared in print - the de-urbanistic project of the "Green City" by Mikhail Barshch and Moisei Ginzburg and the successively urbanistic project of Nikolai Ladovsky.

According to the Green City project, its axis was to be the Yaroslavskoye Highway. Along it, on both sides, there were to be strips of isolating green spaces, behind which dwellings scattered in disarray were to be located (various types of autonomous living cells for one, two or more people were assumed). On every kilometer of the highway it was planned to locate two-story public buildings, which would have canteens, storerooms for servicing residential cells, information centers, sports storerooms, newsstands, hairdressers, etc. Ginzburg and Barshch proposed building a network of such suburbs around Moscow, and in Moscow itself, according to their project, construction should have been completely frozen. At the same time, as the buildings inside the city deteriorated, it was proposed to demolish them; only buildings belonging to the category of cultural and historical monuments were to be preserved.

The rational architect Nikolai Ladovsky believed that Moscow had been a radial-ring fortress city for hundreds of years and did not have the public spaces and buildings necessary for a capital. The architect's plan suggested breaking the radial-ring system of Moscow's planning, opening one of the rings, and giving the city the opportunity for dynamic development in a given direction, namely in the north-west along Gorky Street, Leningradskoye Highway and beyond ("Ladovsky’s parabola"). Over time, Moscow, developing in a northwestern direction, could merge with Leningrad.

In 1932, the Moscow City Council organized a closed competition for the idea of a master plan for Moscow. The competition was attended by the largest functionalists from all over the world - Le Corbusier, Hannes Mayer, Ernst May and Nikolai Ladovsky.

In the project of engineer German Krasin, the layout of Moscow was proposed in the form of a star-shaped structure with a densely built-up center, settlement development along radial highways, between which lay green spaces running from the Moscow Oblast to the center. German architects Ernst May and Hannes Mayer proposed leaving the radial-ring layout and the historical center of the city, in which cultural, administrative and political life was concentrated. It was planned to develop industry in the southeast. Satellite cities were connected to the center and industrial areas by electric railway.

The French-Swiss architect Le Corbusier, a classic of the architectural avant-garde, believed that the medieval radial-ring structure of the plan was not capable of accommodating the new content of the growing city. Le Corbusier proposed a rectangular grid plan instead of the traditional radial ring structure. The territory of the capital was to be divided into zones: in the north there would be a new political center of the city, to the south - four large residential areas, then - the historical center, to the south of which there would be an industrial zone.

There was also a draft general plan authored by Lev Ilyin, proposed in 1936, after the implementation of the general plan. For the first time, an attempt was made to resolve the issue of reconstructing the city center not through the design of individual buildings - the Palace of Soviets or the building of the People's Commissariat of Heavy Industry - but through the design of interconnected ensembles-complexes.

=== Watering plan ===
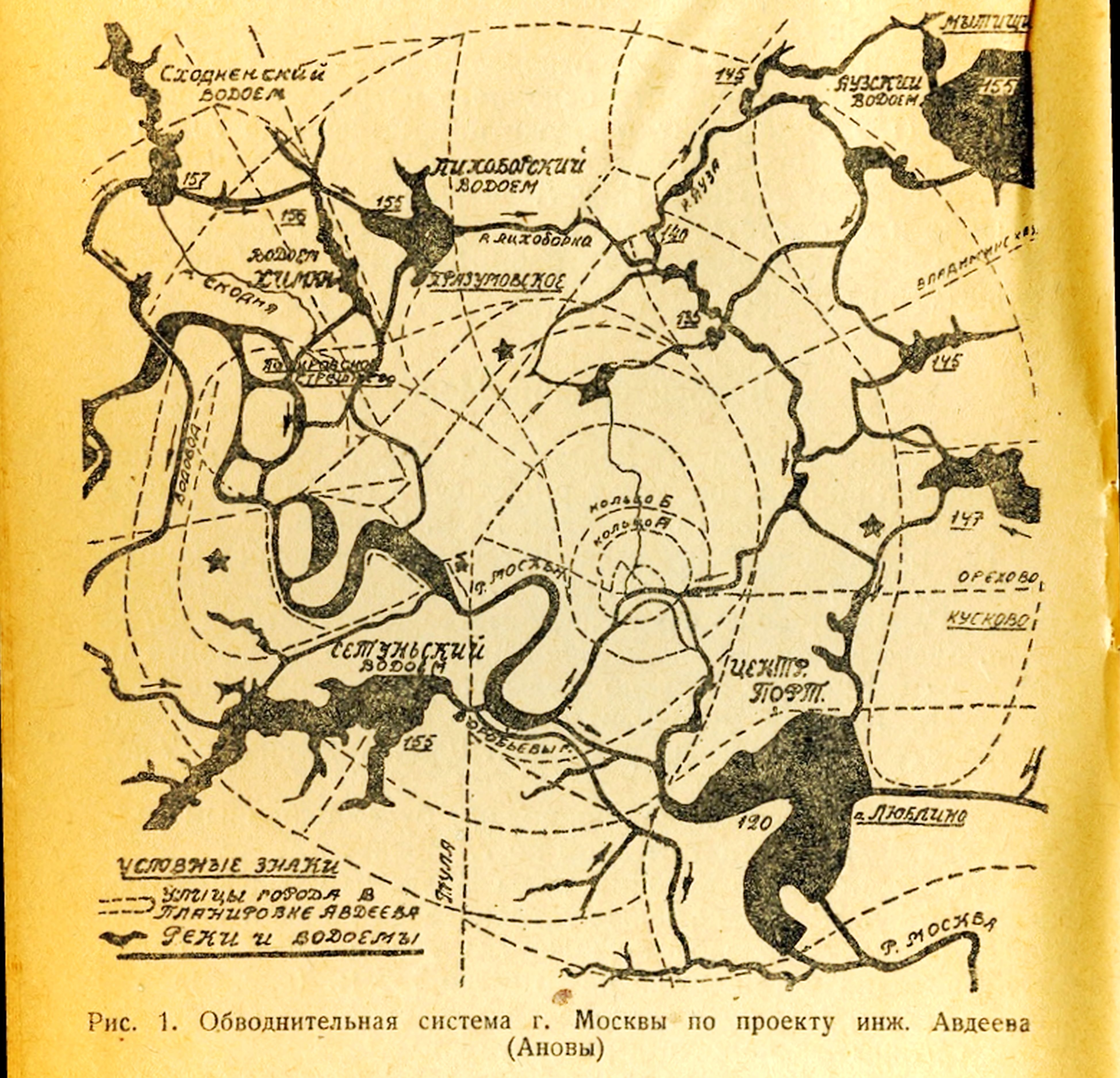
Water supply system of the city of Moscow designed by engineer Avdeev (Anova), 1932

The watering plan also featured a variety of options, which were prepared by various architects. The final options were developed by specialists from Moskanalstroy, organized under the Moscow City Council in 1930. By 1932, they proposed three plans for the Moscow-Volga canal: Staritsky, Shoshinsky and Dmitrovsky. All options had their pros and cons. The Dmitrovsky project was adopted as the general plan for watering. According to this option, the total length of the canal was 128 km, the route began at the confluence of the Bolshaya Dubna river with the Volga and headed south through Dmitrov and Iksha station. Each stage of the canal was a single-chamber lock and pumping station. In the Pestovo area in Mytishchinsky District, located at the confluence of the Chernaya River and the Vyaz, the canal crossed the watershed between the Vyaz and Ucha rivers and turned to the southwest. In this direction, he cut through the Klyazma-Khimki watershed through the valley of the Khimki River and descended along a steep slope to the Moscow River near the village of Shchukino. The geological conditions of the Dmitrov Canal Project were complex and varied, but generally more favorable than those of the other two options.

== The 1935 General Plan ==
None of the competition projects announced earlier was considered convincing enough to become the basis for a future real plan for the transformation of Moscow. Therefore, in 1933, design workshops of the Moscow City Council were created to develop such a plan.

At the plenum of the Central Committee of the Communist Party of the Soviet Union in June 1931, decisions were made to build a metro in Moscow and to connect the Moscow River with a canal to the Volga. The first test train ran on the Sokolniki - Okhotny Ryad section in 1935.

At the same time, the plenum obliged "Moscow organizations to begin developing a scientifically based plan for the further expansion and development of Moscow". Planning workshop No. 2 of the Moscow City Council, one of the leaders of which was the Leningrad architect Vladimir Shchuko, began to deal with issues of reconstruction of the center of the capital in 1933–1935.

In 1935, Joseph Stalin and Vyacheslav Molotov approved the decree "On the General Plan for the Reconstruction of the City of Moscow", which formulated the principles of socialist urban planning, which had a huge influence on its practice and theory in the subsequent period. By the time the general plan was approved, large-scale urban planning work had already been carried out: in 1935, the first stage of the metro was completed and design and construction work began on the construction of the Moscow Canal. After the adoption of the resolution, as part of the next reorganization of the design business in the fall of 1935, planning workshop No. 2 was transformed into architectural and planning workshop No. 2 under the leadership of Vladimir Shchuko and Vladimir Helfreich.

The proletariat inherited a very intricate system of labyrinths, nooks, dead ends, alleys of the old merchant and landowner Moscow. The street goes on like a street, and suddenly in the middle stands an absurd house: some Average Joe took it into his head to perch his house right in the middle of the street or chop off at least a good 5-10 meters from the street for the protrusions of his mansion. With the increase in population, our city will grow to 5 million, with the rapid growth in the number of cars and other types of Public transport in the city, it will be impossible to live unless the city is replanned, the streets are not widened and straightened, and new squares are not created.

— Lazar Kaganovich,

The architects of the 2nd planning workshop faced the difficult task of creating a unified ensemble, taking into account, on the one hand, the Palace of Soviets that had not yet begun construction, and on the other, new buildings already being erected along the route of the future main highway, such as the Building of Council of Labor and Defense, the first stage of the Mossoviet hotel, the "house on Mokhovaya" and the Lenin Library.

The design of the general plan was carried out comprehensively, all planning structures of the city were subjected to engineering, architectural and economic analysis. At the same time, detailed developments of large engineering and technical projects were carried out: the metro, city watering, reconstruction of ground transport, construction and reconstruction of bridges. In 1935, work on the General Plan of Moscow was completed.

The Plan, among other things, included Stalin's urban development ideas:

- New development must proceed by whole ensembles, not by individual buildings.
- City block size should increase from the current 1.5–2 ha (4–5 acres) to 9–15 ha (22–37 acres).
- New development must be limited in density to 400 persons per 1 ha (160 per acre).
- Buildings should be at least 6 storeys high; 7-10-14 storey on first-rate streets.
- Embankments are first-rate streets, only zoned for first-rate housing and offices

These rules effectively banned low-cost mass construction in the old city and "first-rate" streets, as well as single-family homebuilding. Low-cost development proceeded in remote areas, but most funds were diverted to new, expensive "ensemble" projects which valued façades and grandeur more than the needs of overcrowded cities.

It was assumed that the new master plan, developed by Vladimir Semyonov and Sergei Chernyshev, would be implemented within a decade. The development of the city was planned primarily in the southwestern direction, free from industrial enterprises. The plan provided for the construction of new wide transport routes and the expansion of existing ones. The existing bridges were supposed to be updated and expanded, supplemented with new ones (including the Krymsky Bridge). The construction of the Moscow Metro, which was named after Lazar Kaganovich, was considered a priority. Until the Great Patriotic War, work on the implementation of the general plan proceeded continuously, with an increase in the volume of all types of construction.

The first implemented project was the creation of a subway. Construction of the first experimental site began in 1931 on Rusakovskaya Street. In 1933, after approval of the technical design of the first stage, the Metrostroy trust began the main work. The opening of the Moscow metro and its first line, Sokolnicheskaya, took place on May 15, 1935. The launch complex included 11.2 km of route, 13 stations and 12 trains.

Great importance was also attached to the greening of the city, the creation of new parks and the reconstruction of existing ones. It was planned to create five "green" rings around the city center. For the recreation of socialist workers, recreational and park spaces of a new type were organized - Gorky Park and VDNKh. Work on planning the Gorky Park was carried out in 1934–1936. The park was designed by a team of architects led by Aleksandr Vlasov, a master of landscape architecture. The park was created on the site of the 1st All-Russian Agricultural Exhibition of 1922–1923. The size of the park was not limited to the territory of the former exhibition, but increased to 560 hectares, including Neskuchny Garden. The composition of the park included open spaces for cultural events, and recreation areas were characterized by a picturesque layout. For the opening of the new All-Union Agricultural Exhibition in 1939, the largest array of greenery was formed in the north-west of the capital, including the Park of Culture and Leisure named after Dzerzhinsky, Ostankino Park and the Main Botanical Garden

In the fall of 1932, construction of the Moscow-Volga Canal (the current Moscow Canal) began at a rapid pace; it took four years and eight months to dig an artificial river from the Bolshaya Volga station on the outskirts of Dubna to Moscow. The construction was supervised by the NKVD. Thousands of prisoners worked on it, for which Dmitrovlag was specially created, which existed for more than five years. In May 1937, ships carrying cargo and steamships carrying tourists moved through the canal, and it became both a water supply and a shipping route. And two years before that, river transport began to develop, when a government decree of September 8, 1935 approved the decision to create a series of special "canal" vessels. By the beginning of navigation on the canal, it was necessary to develop and build vessels for the new waterway - motor ships, boats, gliders, water taxis, to create a comfortable and convenient fleet. The canal also changed the contours of the ships: in contrast to the old river shapes, angular and tall, the hulls of "canal" motor ships became elongated and streamlined.

Watering of Moscow developed throughout the city. From the north, two ring canals were to go around the capital. One of them, a small one, connected the Yauza river with the Khimki Reservoir, and the second went out to the South Port area. The bends of the Moscow River were supposed to be straightened for ease of navigation. The greatest attention was paid to the construction of canals that were supposed to connect Moscow with all the major rivers of the European part of the country. New high flood-free embankments with a total length of 52 km, lined with granite, were completed by 1937. Between 1936 and 1938, three existing bridges were reconstructed and nine new ones were built, which were among the largest bridges in Europe. They were built in such a way as to allow the passage of large Volga ships that sailed along the Moscow Canal. The flooding of the river and canal system with Volga water and the creation of reservoirs in the vicinity of the capital provided the city with drinking water, water for industrial purposes, and also contributed to the improvement of the city's microclimate.
