= Giprogor Russian Institute of Urban and Investment Development =

- Native name: Российский институт градостроительства и инвестиционного развития «Гипрогор»
- Company type: Joint-stock company
- Industry: Architecture, Urban planning, Construction
- Founded: 1930; 96 years ago
- Headquarters: 29 Vernadsky Avenue, Moscow, Russia
- Website: giprogor.ru

Giprogor Russian Institute of Urban and Investment Development (Russian: Российский институт градостроительства и инвестиционного развития «Гипрогор»)) is a Russian company, one of the leading design organizations in Russia in the field of urban planning of the territory of the Russian Federation, its regions and cities, design of city centers, residential, public, industrial zones and complexes, resort, recreational and environmental areas. The company's central office is located in Vernadsky Avenue in Moscow.

== History ==
The company was established in October-November 1930 (according to other sources in 1929) on the basis of the City Planning Bureau of the Map Publishing House of the NKVD of the RSFSR and the joint-stock company "Proektgrazhdanstroy" for the design of master plans for cities and workers' settlements, the development of design documentation for new buildings of the First five-year plan. The original name was the State Trust for the Planning of Populated Areas and Civil Design of the NKVD of the RSFSR (Giprogor). In December 1930, it was reorganized into a State Joint-Stock Company, in January 1932 - into the State Institute of Surveying and Urban Planning and Design of Civil Structures of the NKVD of the RSFSR.

Among the organizers and creative leaders of the institute were domestic scientists and practitioners in the field of urban planning and development. The organization of the new institute was led by the head of the Main Directorate of Public Utilities of the NKVD of the RSFSR David Sheinis. Viktor Vesnin, Vladimir Obraztsov and Vladimir Semyonov worked as consultants for Giprogor. Among the staff of the institute are Lev Ilyin, Moisei Ginzburg, Georgy Sheleikhovsky, Sergey Ovsyannikov, Vladimir Vitman, David Sheinis, Sergey Chernyshyov, Arkady Arkin, Nikolai Markovnikov, Dmitry Chechulin, Ignaty Milinis, Mikhail Barshch and others. In a short time, Giprogor became the largest design organization in the country (1,500 employees).

At the end of 1934, Giprogor was transferred to Leningrad, and two operating architectural workshops (under the leadership of Vladimir Semyonov and N.Z. Nessis) were transferred directly to the People's Commissariat of Public Utilities of the RSFSR.

In the 1930s, Giprogor carried out work on the comprehensive design of centers for the development of the North, the Arctic, and new cities: Kirovsk, Murmansk, Syktyvkar; planning projects have been developed for a number of capitals of the union republics - Minsk; Baku, Yerevan, Petrozavodsk, such large regional centers as Gorky, Sverdlovsk, Novosibirsk, Kalinin, Yaroslavl.

During the Great Patriotic War and the post-war years, Giprogor carried out work to strengthen the country's defense capability and restore the national economy. Of particular note are the projects for the revival of Stalingrad, Oryol, Bryansk, Krasnodar, Kaliningrad, comprehensive work on the development of important industrial centers of the country: Magnitogorsk, Chelyabinsk, Kuznetsk Basin.

By the end of the 80s, Giprogor had developed design and planning documentation for more than 700 cities in Russia. A special place in the design practice of the institute was occupied by the historical cities of Russia - Veliky Novgorod, Suzdal, Sergiyev Posad. The company participated in the creation of master plan for newly created cities of Volzhsky, Bratsk, Volgodonsk, Stary Oskol, Nizhnekamsk with a full range of social, industrial, transport, engineering infrastructure, residential areas damaged by earthquakes were restored in Tashkent and Leninakan.

Over the past decades, the institute has developed master plans for the historical centers of Russia - Derbent, Murom, the science city of Obninsk, the eastern cities of the country - Magadan and Anadyr, and has launched work to update the main urban planning documents for Omsk, Nizhnevartovsk, Taganrog, Bryansk, Kursk and Smolensk.

Recent projects of the company include the master plan for the 2014 Winter Olympics in Sochi and together with Roszheldorproject planning projects for the entire territory allocated for the Olympics, APEC Russia 2012 in Vladivostok, Special Economic Zones "New Anapa" in the Krasnodar Krai and "Grand Spa Yutsa" in the Stavropol Krai (Pyatigorsk), oversees important strategic projects - the restoration of the Chechen Republic, and today - South Ossetia and Abkhazia. Giprogor is the founder of the self-regulatory organization of designers in Russia, the Association of Urban Planning and Design, and has permission to carry out the entire range of design work. The company is licensed by the FSB to work with State Secrets.

== See also ==
- Urban planning in Russia
- Urban planning in communist countries
- Architecture of Russia
