= Dacha settlement =

Dacha settlement (Russian: Дачный посёлок) is a type of settlement consisting of a group of individually built houses (dachas), usually not intended for permanent (year-round) residence, located on separate plots. Unlike villages and gardening associations, in dacha settlements the allocated plots are intended primarily for housing construction, and not for farming. In Russia, a settlement called a dacha settlement has the status of an urban-type settlement, and its population is recorded by Russian Federal State Statistics Service as urban.

== History ==
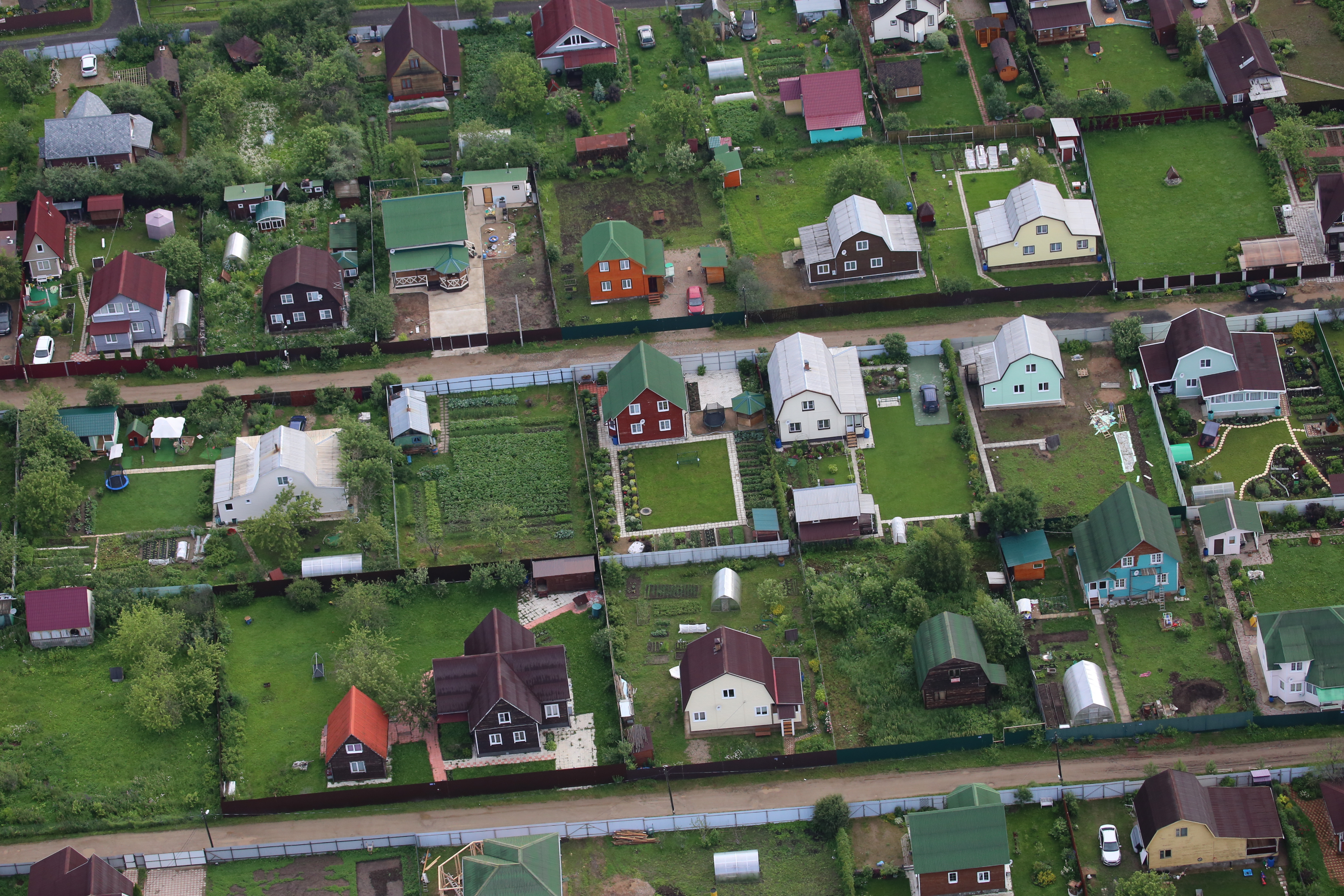
Typical Dacha settlement in Yaroslavl Oblast

Dacha settlements as an independent type of settlement began to emerge at the end of early classicism. The emergence of dacha settlements along the Petersburg Highway near Moscow and in the immediate vicinity of Petersburg (Pargolovo, Yekateringof, etc.), the transformation of suburbs near imperial residences (Pavlovsk, Peterhof, Tsarskoye Selo, Gatchina, Oranienbaum) into dacha places coincided with the time of Romanticism.

In the second third of the 19th century, with the onset of urbanization and industrialization, factories and plants began to smoke, and apartment buildings appeared. For the summer and weekends, everyone who could afford it tried to send their families to nature. The transport system improved, and with the development of railways, dachas began to be built everywhere.

If initially, country recreation at your own dacha was available mainly to a small layer of wealthy people, then by the end of the 19th century it became a mass phenomenon. This led to the emergence of such a phenomenon as "dacha area" (Russian: дачная местность), which began to appear en masse around the large cities of the Russian Empire. The term Zaimka (Russian: Заимка) (more often in Siberia and in the north of European Russia) was also widely used to denote a city dweller's country estate. However, there was one significant difference between a Zaimka and a dacha: production activities were carried out on a Zaimka, while a dacha was used exclusively for recreation. In the end, the word Zaimka did not catch on in relation to dacha settlements.

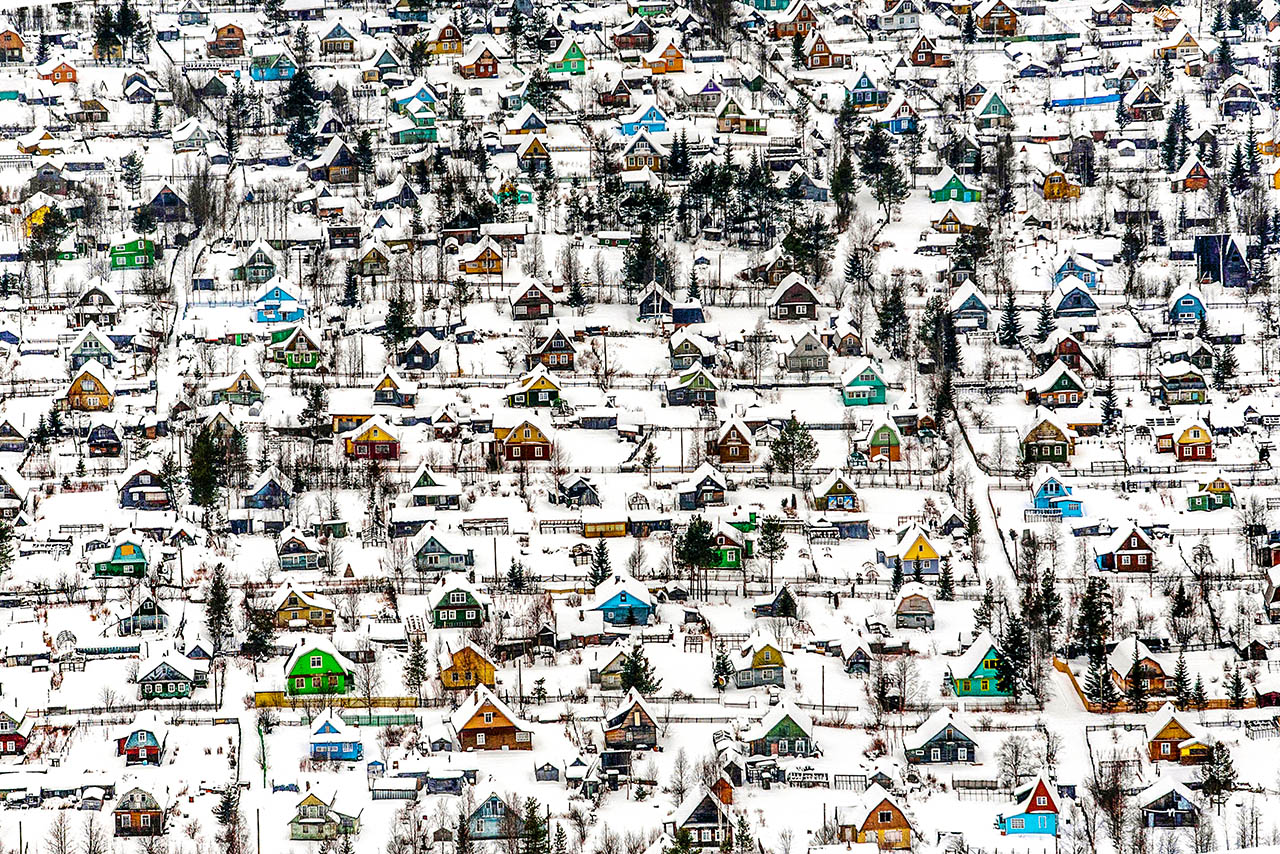
View of a Dacha settlement in the winter in Arkhangelsk Oblast

Initially, dacha settlements grew haphazardly and without any special regulations. Dachas were either built up as a continuous development, or were separated by clearings and groves, with driveways and passages formed between them. When the number of dacha sites began to grow, the Zemstvos developed rules for the preliminary division of lands to be developed into blocks with mandatory road widths (10 sazhens) to ensure access and fire safety, since dachas were wooden and often burned down.

The transformation of surrounding settlements into dacha areas did not occur everywhere, but in places where there were good conditions for recreation: transport accessibility, places for swimming and fishing, forests for picking berries, mushrooms and cones, favourable natural conditions, as well as a minimum acceptable level of comfort.

Dacha settlements as new types of settlements were formed from many mini-estates, organized according to the principles of urban planning. These new settlements were built on the basis of the city street network, as a rule, regular; the placement of the house here is predetermined not only by the landscape features of the site, its size, configuration, but also by the layout of the streets. Many dacha settlements around large Russian cities and, in particular, around Moscow formed a kind of "dacha belt", which created a "special world" preserving the uniqueness and originality of each dacha place. The emergence of summer cottage settlements (as well as summer cottages in existing suburban villages) contributed to the spread of the urban lifestyle to an increasing number of surrounding villages and hamlets.

The largest summer cottage settlements eventually ceased to be exclusively summer cottage settlements, turning into full-fledged settlements with year-round living. Industry began to develop in them, which further contributed to their development.

After the revolution, the summer cottages confiscated from the nobility were transferred to state and public organizations (orphanages, boarding schools, sanatoriums, various public associations), as well as to representatives of the party and bureaucratic nomenklatura. In the country, summer cottage life, as part of urban culture, died out for some time for the broad masses of city dwellers. However, with the advent of the NEP, it was revived again. Undeveloped land plots began to be allocated to city dwellers outside the city limits. In the post-war period, two main organizational and legal forms of construction of dacha housing for city dwellers were established - gardening associations and dacha cooperatives.

Since 1983, settlements of the RSFSR with the category of "dacha settlements" began to be statistically taken into account as urban-type settlements, their population as an urban population, and dacha settlement councils were excluded from the list of rural councils.

Since 1988, suburban construction was permitted, both according to standard and individual projects, but in strict accordance with the development scheme of the territory of the collective garden.

== See also ==
- Classification of inhabited localities in Russia
