= Vladimir Semyonov =

Vladimir Semyonov may refer to:

- Vladimir Semyonov (general) (born 1940), Russian colonel-general; first president of the Karachay-Cherkess Republic
- Vladimir Semyonov (politician) (1911–1992), Soviet diplomat
- Vladimir Semyonov (architect) (1874-1960), Soviet architect
- Vladimir Semyonov (footballer) (born 1972), Russian footballer
- Vladimir Semyonov (water polo) (1938–2016), Russian Olympic water polo player
