= Sergey Chernyshyov (architect) =

Soviet restorer and architect (1881–1963)

- Сергей Чернышёв
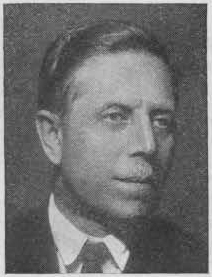
- Born: October 4, 1881; Aleksandrovka, Kolomensky District, Russian Empire
- Died: April 26, 1963 (aged 81); Moscow, Soviet Union
- Resting place: Novodevichy Cemetery
- Citizenship: Soviet
- Education: Imperial Academy of Arts; Moscow School of Painting, Sculpture and Architecture
- Occupations: Architect, lecturer
- Awards: USSR State Prize; Order of Lenin; Order of the Red Banner of Labour; Order of the Badge of Honour; Medal "For Valiant Labour in the Great Patriotic War 1941–1945"
- Buildings: Building of Marx–Engels–Lenin Institute; Main building of Moscow State University

Sergey Egorovich Chernyshyov (Russian: Сергей Егорович Чернышёв; 4 October 1881 - April 26, 1963) was a Russian and Soviet architect, urban planner and teacher, chief architect of Moscow in 1934–1941, author of the General Plan for the Reconstruction of Moscow (1935). 1st Secretary of the Union of Architects of the USSR (1950–1955). Winner of the Stalin Prize, first degree (1949), for the design of the Main building of Moscow State University).

== Biography ==
Born in 1881 in the village of Aleksandrovka, Kolomensky District, Moscow Oblast into a peasant family. His father was a self-taught icon painter. Chernyshyov showed early artistic talent and in 1893 a peasant gathering decided to send him to study. In the same year he entered the Moscow School of Painting, Sculpture and Architecture. At first he studied in the painting class of Valentin Serov, Isaac Levitan, Konstantin Korovin and Apollinary Vasnetsov, then he became interested in architecture and was transferred to the architectural class. He graduated from college in 1901 with a silver medal.

In the same year he entered the Higher Art School at the Imperial Academy of Arts, where he studied in the workshop of Leon Benois. He graduated from college in 1907 with the title of artist-architect. For the completion of his diploma project "Building of the Permanent Court of Arbitration" he was sent on a retirement trip abroad; I studied architectural monuments in Italy and Greece for about a year. After returning to Russia, he began working in the studio of the architect Nikita Lazarev, and took part in the design of 10 apartment buildings, mansions and public buildings. In 1909 he joined the Moscow Architectural Society.

After some time, he began his independent architectural practice. His fame was brought to him by his victory in 1915 in the competition for a building for the Literary and Artistic Circle in Moscow. In 1916, according to his design, the Abrikosov mansion on Ostozhenka Street and the Gorenki estate of Andrey Razumovsky near Balashikha were rebuilt. In Gorenki, Chernyshyov recreated the "Golden Hall" in the palace, decorated it with paintings and artificial marble. He also decorated the garden and park facade of the palace with a 14-column loggia and a symmetrical semicircular colonnade, which connected the corner pavilions to the main building.

After the October Revolution, he worked in the construction department of the Bureau of the Moscow Council of District Dumas. In the 1920s, according to Chernyshyov's projects, as part of a plan for monumental propaganda, plaques were installed on a number of Moscow buildings ("Respect for antiquity is, undoubtedly, one of the signs of true enlightenment" - on the building of the Historical Museum; "Workers of the world, unite!" - on the building of the Central Archive; “War will give birth to heroes” - on the building of the Revolutionary Military Council on Znamenka Street; mostly the boards have not survived). Alexey Shchusev and I. V. Zholtovsky, was a member of the Presidium of the Architectural Workshop of the Moscow City Council. The architect solved projects of this time in the style of constructivism. In 1923, he took part in the competition to develop a situational plan for the All-Russian Agricultural and Handicraft-Industrial Exhibition, then, under the leadership of Ivan Zholtovsky, he participated in the development of the master plan of the exhibition and technical designs of exhibition pavilions (entrance arch, "hexagon", main pavilion, auditorium, pavilions of mechanical engineering, field farming, land reclamation, arena). After the end of the exhibition, he worked in the design bureau of the "Standard" construction society, where, together with V.N. Semenov, he worked on the development of a master plan for the First Workers' Village in Ivanovo-Voznesensk. At the end of the 1920s he worked in Energostroy, in the early 1930s - in the sector of planning of populated areas of the Giprogor Russian Institute of Urban and Investment Development and the Architectural and Art Council of the Moscow City Council.

In 1934-1941 he served as chief architect of Moscow, head of the planning department of the Moscow City Council Archplan. In 1935, together with V.N. Semenov, he was one of the main developers of the Master Plan for the Reconstruction of Moscow.

His significant works were the planning of the former Khamovnichesky district of Moscow, the development of a master plan for the reconstruction of Moscow (1935), part of which was the planning of the All-Russian Agricultural Exhibition (1939), the reconstruction and design of Gorky Street (now Tverskaya Street) and Leningradskoye Highway (since 1933), where special attention was paid to focused on squares as the main accents of the highway.

Chief architect of the All-Union Agricultural Exhibition in 1939, full member of the ASA of the USSR (1939), chairman of the architectural affairs department of the Moscow City Executive Committee (1944–1948), first secretary of the Union of Architects of the USSR (1950–1955).

He taught at the Moscow Polytechnic Institute, VKHUTEMAS - VKHUTEIN (1918–1930) and the Moscow Architectural Institute (1931–1950).

He died in 1963 at the age of 82. He was buried in Moscow at the Novodevichy cemetery.

On April 25, 2018, a memorial plaque was unveiled on the house at the address: st. Burdenko, 14B, in which Chernyshyov lived from 1913 to 1963 (sculptor Polina Gnezdilova).

Political offices
Preceded by Vladimir Semyonov	Chief Architect of Moscow; 1934—1941	Succeeded by Dmitry Chechulin
