= Vladimir Semyonov (architect) =

Soviet architect (1874–1960)

- Владимир Семёнов
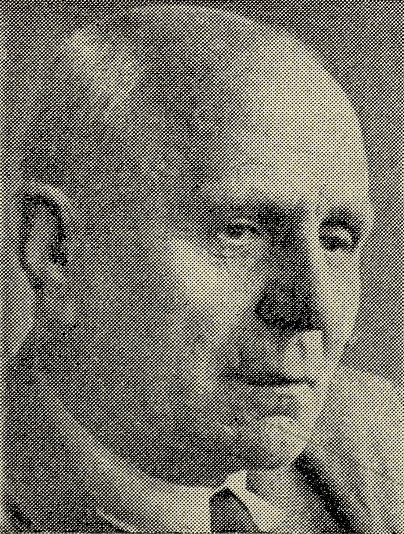
- Architecture of the USSR - No 10 - 1939
- Born: 1 February 1874; Kislovodsk, Caucasus Governorate, Russian Empire
- Died: 1 February 1960 (aged 86); Moscow, Soviet Union
- Resting place: Novodevichy Cemetery
- Citizenship: Soviet
- Education: Institute of Civil Engineers
- Occupations: Architect, lecturer

Vladimir Nikolayevich Semyonov (Russian: Владимир Николаевич Семёнов; 1 February [O.S. 20 January] 1874 – 1 February 1960) was a Russian and Soviet architect, professor, member of the USSR Academy of Architecture, chief architect Moscow in 1932–1934. One of the pioneers (along with Grigory Dubelir, Arnold Ensch and Mikhail Dikansky) of scientific urban planning in the Soviet Union. Under the leadership of Vladimir Semyonov, a Master Plan for the Reconstruction of Moscow was developed in the 1930s.

== Biography ==
Born into the family of ethnographer and Caucasus expert Nikolai Semyonov, who served as a military topographer in the North Caucasus. Since the 1860s, he studied the history and traditions of the Caucasian peoples, and translated the resulting materials into Russian and published them in research journals. Nikolai Semyonov was among the first to research the history of the Caucasian Huns.

Vladimir Semyonov at the age of 10 entered the Vladikavkaz 1st Real School. Six years later, in 1892, he received a certificate and in the same year entered the Institute of Civil Engineers of Emperor Nicholas I, where entrance exams were quite difficult. A feature of the educational program was equal attention paid to the teaching of engineering-constructive and artistic-plastic academic disciplines

In 1898, Semenov received a diploma with a silver medal and began his professional activities. He began his career in the office of the chief architect of Gatchina, Nikolai Dmitriev. However, the very next year he volunteered for the Second Boer War, where he fought in the ranks of the Boer army for three years. During the war he met with the young journalist Winston Churchill. After being wounded, Semyonov returned to Russia with great difficulty.

In 1902-1908 he worked as an architect in the Pyatigorsk Department of Caucasian Mineral Waters, where his talent was fully demonstrated. He created buildings in the modern and neoclassical styles that were fashionable at that time. He designed several buildings that are currently considered iconic for the Caucasian resort region. According to his project, the city's largest hotel, the Bristol, was built in Pyatigorsk, and the Azau sanatorium was built in Yessentuki. Private clients also turned to the architect, among them the most famous was the Emir of Bukhara 'Abd al-Ahad Khan, on whose order Semyonov created two dachas. The palace built in Zheleznovodsk has survived to this day as a sanatorium building. The dacha in Kislovodsk “Mauritania” was lost during the Soviet period.

=== Work during the Soviet period ===
With the establishment of Soviet power, he remained in the country and continued his professional activities. In the early 1920s, he headed the Scientific and Technical Council at the Council of People's Commissars and began teaching: he lectured on urban planning at the highest artistic and technical workshops of the Moscow Higher Technical School, and then at the Moscow Architectural Institute. In 1923, the State Academic Council of the People's Commissariat for Education approved him with the rank of professor in the specialty "Urban Planning".

In 1927 he created the Bureau of Urban Planning, which four years later was reformed into the Giprogor Russian Institute of Urban and Investment Development. This organization, in particular, took up the comprehensive planning of large Soviet cities with the established historical development of the center. Projects for Astrakhan, Kuibyshev, Minsk, Stalingrad were developed, and the largest work in which Semenov took part was the planning of the resort and recreational area in Pyatigorsk, Zheleznovodsk, Yessentuki and Kislovodsk.

It is noteworthy that while actively introducing new principles of urban planning, the architect was concerned about the presentation of historical architecture. In the article "Planning Issues", published in 1935, he drew attention to the unfavorable, in his opinion, location of some city squares, which block views of architectural ensembles:

Many urban ensembles are spoiled by greenery. The latter is allowed to grow, cover the architecture, and destroy the integrity of the impression. Instead of a city, it turns out to be a dacha. Examples: the center of Leningrad, where the Alexander Garden destroys the central ensemble. In Moscow, this was Sverdlov Square with its good-natured grove in the middle

.

In 1932, he was appointed chief architect of Moscow: he headed the Architectural and Planning Department of the Moscow City Council. Under his leadership, a group of leading architects began to develop a plan for the development and reconstruction of the capital. Soon, the draft of the General Plan of Moscow” was published - a design document that formed the basis of the General Plan for the Reconstruction of Moscow approved in 1935.

In articles published in the mid-1930s, he discussed the future transformations of the capital. The architect considered it necessary to preserve both the established appearance of the central part of the city and the existing radial-ring grid of streets. He proceeded from the assumption that over time the city's population would exceed the five million mark. Semyonov believed that in the future it would be advisable to expand the so-called Greater Moscow: an agglomeration with the capital in the center and a chain of satellite cities on the periphery. He believed that the border of the capital should run along the ring road, and behind it there should be a "solid, tightly guarded chain" of city parks: Vorobyovy Gory, Serebryany Bor, Ostankino, Sokolniki and others. He proposed leaving a 15-kilometer area behind the park area, within which development would be improved and the existing forest park area would be preserved.

According to the plan, the outer ring of cities passing along the level of Kashira was the last zone of Greater Moscow. He explained this coverage of the territory by the intersection of transport routes: railways and traffic flow along the Oka. Thus, the vast territory would ensure the supply of bread, metal and fuel from different regions of the country. In developing the architectural appearance of the capital, Semyonov considered it necessary to take into account economic feasibility, but at the same time also build expressive architectural ensembles. In the article "Moscow to be planned and rebuilt", he emphasized:

Let our residential buildings be simple, calm, organized into masses. This is the frame, this is the background for public buildings. But let our public buildings be rich, majestic, not repetitive, let all types of fine arts merge their efforts in the overall work of building, rebuilding and decorating Moscow

.

In the 1930s, Vladimir Semyonov became a full member of the USSR Academy of Architecture, and from 1941 he headed the academy's Urban Planning Research Institute for ten years.

Back in 1938, Vladimir Semyonov was assigned to develop a project for the development of a large industrial center in Rostov-on-Don located in the south of the country. The work was completed two years later. With the outbreak of the Great Patriotic War, the implementation of the project was interrupted, but after that Semyonov also worked on a plan for the restoration of the city. Rostov suffered greatly, so the architect had the opportunity to develop a free-range development plan practically. The disadvantage of the pre-war layout was the chain of industrial facilities that extended along the river. Semyonov preserved the existing planning structure and location of the central part of the city, but at the same time linked the blocks with residential and public buildings from the Don embankment.

He publicly announced his goals in the article "On the General Plan of the City of Rostov-on-Don", which was published in 1949 in the collection "Problems of Soviet Urban Planning". The backbone of the urban layout was two intersecting highways. One is Engels Street, which already existed at that time, on which four squares are located in succession: named after Maxim Gorky (intended for holding demonstrations, the drama theater was also located there), named after Kirov (where the university, library, museum were located), House of Soviets (city administration ) and the square opposite the city garden (with the opera house). One of the features of the plan was the creation of a main center and three peripheral ones: the eastern one was around Karl Marx Square, the western one was near Druzhinnikov Square, and the northern one was just beginning to take shape.

Semyonov summarized the experience of restoring settlements in his 1947 article "Fundamentals of the planning of cities under construction". He believed that even the construction of standard structures does not allow the creation of so-called "model cities". Each city was created under the influence of a combination of factors, including climate and terrain, which cannot be ignored.

In our country, landscaping usually means water supply, sewerage, etc. But that, of course, is not all... The culture of populated areas in the Soviet country is, first of all, caring about a person, about his coziness, comfort and convenience. We consider a comfortable city to be one that is characterized by an abundance of light, air and greenery, which provides a person with maximum convenience for work, movement, rest and entertainment... We think of greenery not as decorative islands or flower beds scattered here and there, but as large green areas gardens, boulevards and parks, comprehensively covering the entire urban area and being the main element in the architecture of the city

.

Vladimir Semyonov retained influence in the professional community even after the death of Joseph Stalin, Secretary of the Central Committee of the All-Union Communist Party of Bolsheviks. During the Khrushchev reorganization of the Academy of Architecture in 1956, he was elected an honorary member of the USSR Academy of Construction and Architecture.

The last years of Semenov's life were overshadowed by a series of family tragedies: his wife died in 1958, and his son died in 1959. Vladimir Semyonov died in Moscow on February 1, 1960, and was buried at the Novodevichy Cemetery.

Political offices
Preceded by Position created	Chief Architect of Moscow; 1932–1934	Succeeded by Sergey Chernyshyov
