= Central Research Institute of Urban Development =

Russian research institute

- Established: 1931
- Address: 29 Vernadskogo Street
- Location: Moscow, Russia
- Coordinates: 55°40′53″N 37°30′58″E
- Interactive map of Central Research Institute of Urban Development

The Central Research and Design Institute for Urban Development of the Russian Academy of Architecture and Construction Sciences (Russian: Центральный научно-исследовательский и проектный институт по градостроительству known in its acronym TSNIIP Gradostroitel'stva (Russian: ЦНИИП градостроительства)) is one of the leading institutes in the country, which took part in the design of master plans for more than a hundred cities in the Soviet Union, the urban development component of a number of regions and the implementation of state target programs, the creation of a scientific, methodological and regulatory framework for urban development and district planning. Since 1997, it has been a member of Russian Academy of Architecture and Construction Sciences.

== History ==
The Central Research and Design Institute of Urban Development originates from the state trust for the design of workers' towns and settlements for industry "Standartproekt", created in 1931, which was part of the All-Union Association "Soyuzstandartzhilstroy".

In 1933, the trust "Vuzstroyproekt" was included in "Standartproekt", and the new trust was named "Gosstroyproekt". Its branches were also created in Leningrad and Novosibirsk.

After the end of the Great Patriotic War, Gorstroyproekt employees made a significant contribution to the restoration of cities damaged by military action: Dnepropetrovsk, Donetsk, Zaporozhye, Sevastopol, Stalingrad and others. The Kiev branch of Gorstroyproekt and the Kharkov Gorstroyproekt were created on the basis of the institute.

In 1964, the State Design Institute "Gorstroyproekt" and the Institute of Urban Development and Regional Planning of the USSR Academy of Construction and Architecture were merged and on their basis the Central Research and Design Institute for Urban Development was created, which belonged to the recently created Gosgrazhdanstroy under the Gosstroy of the USSR. The Central Research and Design Institute for Urban Development also created branches (in Yerevan, Minsk, Tbilisi and Frunze (Bishkek)).

In 1991-1997 The Central Research Institute of Urban Development was part of the Russian State Construction Committee, and in 1998 it was included in the list of scientific institutions of the Russian Academy of Architecture and Construction Sciences.

In 2017, on the basis of the Central Research Institute of Urban Development, by merging with it:

- Research Institute of Theory and History of Architecture and Urban Development of the Russian Academy of Architecture and Construction Sciences;
- Order of the Badge of Honor of the Ural Research and Design Institute of the Russian Academy of Architecture and Construction Sciences;
- Far Eastern Research, Design and Technological Institute of the Russian Academy of Architecture and Construction Sciences;
- Seven regional branches of the Russian Academy of Architecture and Construction Sciences (Far Eastern, Southern, Siberian, Ural, Volga, Northwestern and Central),

Federal State Budgetary Institution "Central Research and Design Institute of the Ministry of Construction and Housing and Communal Services of the Russian Federation" (TsNIIP Minstroy of Russia) was created

In the 2010s, the Central Research Institute of Urban Development continued to study issues of urban planning ecology. Thus, in 2014, the institute held a Round Table on the topic of "Problems of Urban Development in the Moscow Agglomeration Zone".

== Selected projects ==
The institute's staff participated in the design of more than a hundred cities, including the development of master plans for Ashgabat, Yerevan, Novosibirsk, Odessa, Rostov-on-Don, Sverdlovsk, Tashkent, Tbilisi, Kharkov, Chelyabinsk and several others. At the beginning of the 21st century, master plans for the cities of Voronezh, Kazan, Orel, Saratov, Yaroslavl and others were developed, as well as territorial planning schemes for the Altai Territory and the Altai Republic, Belgorod, Novosibirsk and Smolensk regions.

Design work was also carried out for cities during the implementation of industrial projects of national importance, including:

- Balakovo (Balakovo NPP);
- Naberezhnye Chelny (Kama Automobile Plant);
- Nakhodka (Nakhodka Sea Trade Port);
- Tolyatti (Volzhsky Automobile Plant);
