= Russian State Research and Design Institute of Urbanism =

Russian research institute

- Established: 1929
- Address: 21 Basseynaya Street
- Location: Saint Petersburg, Russia
- Coordinates: 59°51′51″N 30°18′34″E
- Interactive map of Russian State Research and Design Institute of Urbanism

The Russian State Research and Design Institute of Urbanism (Russian: Российский научно-исследовательский и проектный институт урбанистики) is one of the leading design institutes in Russia in the field of urban development and territorial planning. It is located in Saint Petersburg on Basseynaya Street.

== History ==
The institute was founded in 1929 in Leningrad on the basis of the City Planning Bureau of the Leningrad City Executive Committee and the sector of the Cartographic Publishing House of the NKVD of the RSFSR under the name "Giprogor" (State Institute of Urban Design). For the first 6 months from its foundation, it was located right in the apartment of its first director Lev Ilyin. Later, the Institute changed addresses several times: Academy of Arts; Alexander Nevsky Lavra; Nevsky Prospect, 176; Nevsky Prospect, 7/9; Ioannovsky ravelin of the Peter and Paul Fortress.

The heyday of the institute came in the post-war period. By that time, a high-level urban planning school had been formed at the institute, which was represented by architects V. P. Yakovlev, V. A. Gaikovich, D. D. Baragin, N. A. Solofnenko, Yu. M. Kilovatov. In 1947, A. V. Makhrovskaya, then a novice architect, and later a prominent Soviet urban planner, a major specialist in the field of reconstruction of historical buildings and protection of unique historical and cultural heritage, a corresponding member of the Russian Academy of Architecture and Construction Sciences, joined their team. With the active participation of Makhrovskaya, "Giprogor" developed projects for the central part of the city of Petrozavodsk and Simferopol.

In 1959, after merging with the Leningrad GiproKommunStroy, the institute received a new name - Lengiprogor.

The institute developed master plans for the development of many cities in the USSR, including the master plan of Lipetsk, master plans for district centers in the Bryansk Oblast and Leningrad Oblast. Among the implemented projects of those years, there are cities designed and built from scratch (for example, the cities of Krasnokamsk and Kirovo-Chepetsk).

In 1991, the institute was given its current name. The renaming was initiated by the current director V. A. Shchitinsky.

The institute carries out all types of urban development, architectural and construction projects, projects in the field of environmental protection and engineering support of cities. The projects include a scheme for planning urban development of the Chuvash Republic, a strategy for the socio-economic development of the Tyumen Region, a territorial scheme for the Rostov Region, master plans for Krasnoyarsk, Khabarovsk, Belgorod, Rostov-on-Don, Tyumen, Berezniki, Ussuriysk, Naryan-Mar, Salekhard, Tobolsk, Ishim and others, a project for the Krasnaya Polyana ski resort in Sochi, which served as the basis for submitting an application to host the 2014 Winter Olympics.

Employees of the Institute of Urban Studies are taking part in the development of St. Petersburg projects, including the reclamation of Vasilievsky Island and the reconstruction of industrial areas around the Badayevsky warehouses.
