= Town Planning Code of Russia =

Parliament of Russia
- Citation: 190-ФЗ
- Territorial extent: Russia
- Enacted by: Parliament of Russia
- Signed by: President of Russia
- Signed: 29 December 2004
- Commenced: 30 December 2004
- Status: Current legislation

Town Planning Code of Russia (Russian: Градостроительный Кодекс Российской Федерации) is a legislative act of the Russia dedicated to:

- engineering of building
- town planning
- territorial planning
- sustainable development of territories
- regulations forzones with special use conditions
- land use and development rules
- rules for self-regulatory organizations in the field of engineering studies, architectural and construction design, construction, reconstruction, repair of capital construction projects
- regulate of making of programs of integrated development of communal settlement infrastructure systems, urban Region
- powers of the state authorities of the Russian Federation in the field of town-planning activity

Town Planning Code was accepted the State Duma in 2004.
