= Greater Moscow =

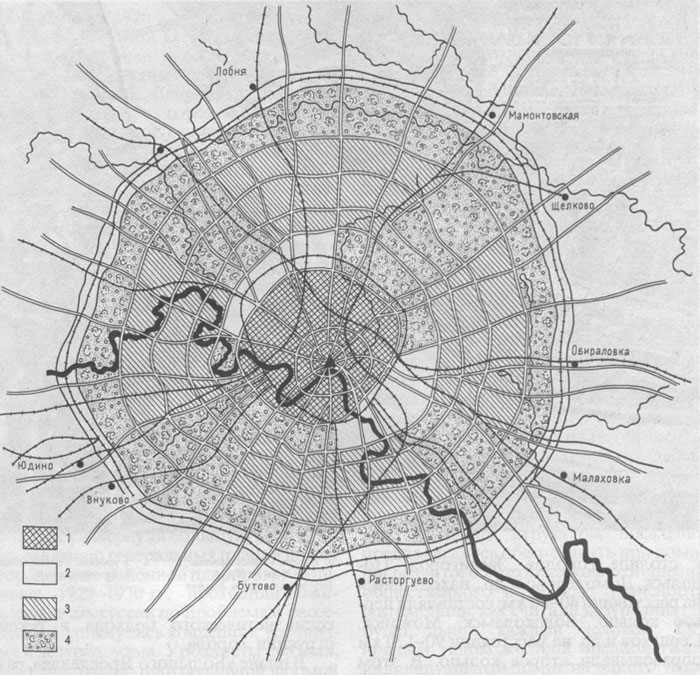
Shestakov's Greater Moscow project

Greater Moscow (Russian: Большая Москва, romanized: Bol'shaya Moskva) was a general plan of Moscow developed in 1921–1925 by Sergey Sergeyevich Shestakov. The plan was approved in 1925 by Mossoviet.

== History ==
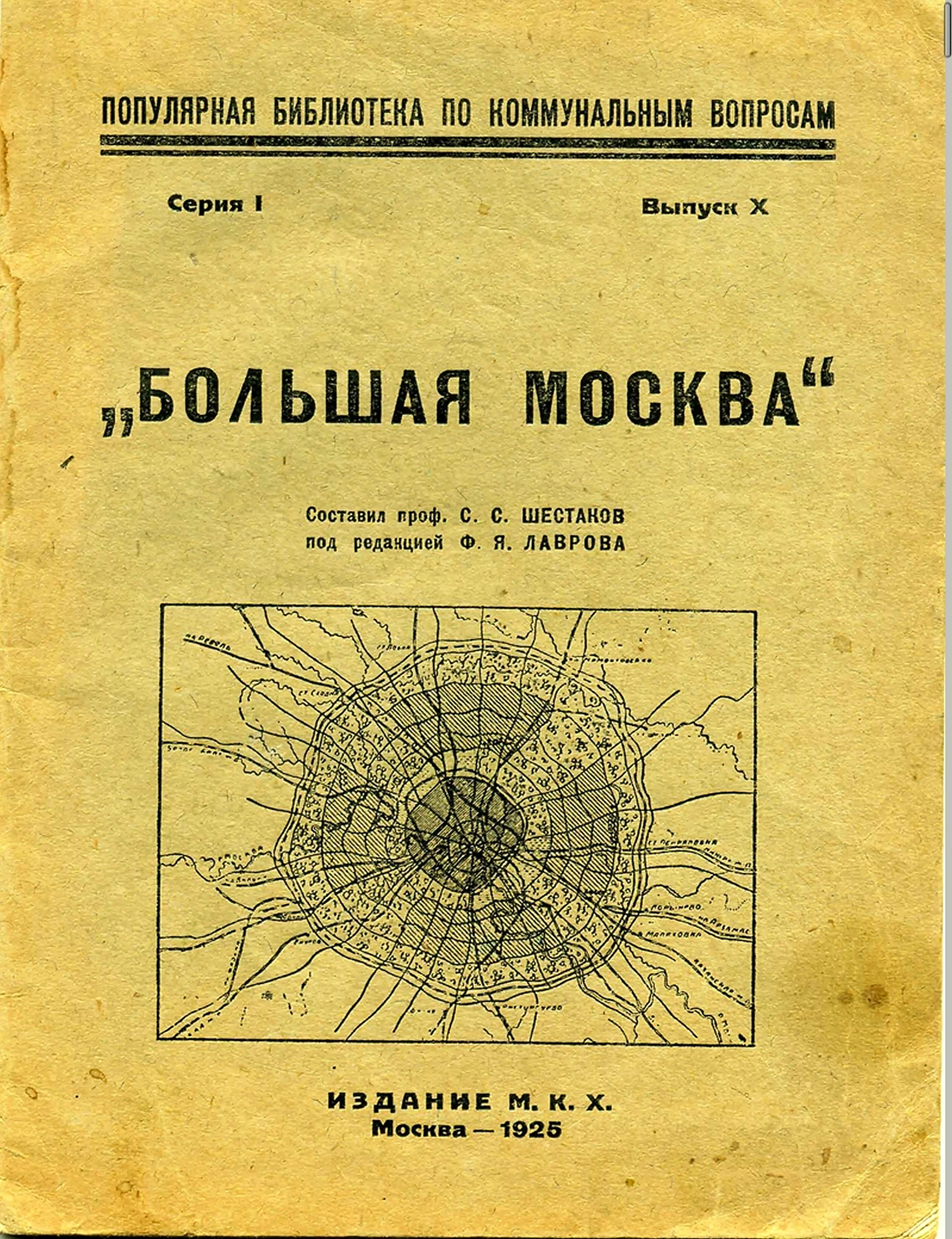
Title page of the book Greater Moscow by Sergey Shestakov

The plan suggested that Moscow's territory be expanded to 700 square kilometers; up to 1,800 square kilometers with two green belts. It was supposed that population will reach four million by 1945 and six million by 1960.

Moscow was to be divided into four zones. The first zone was to be located inside of the Circular Railway (currently Small Ring of Moscow Railways) for commercial and residential construction. The second zone would have been the territory outside of the Circular Railway, and was intended for industrial purposes. The third zone was planned as a green residential zone. Finally, the fourth zone would have been a green belt, three to five kilometers wide, serving as a border between the city and the suburban areas. A smaller green belt was planned in between zones two and three, as was a surrounding double ring of satellite cities with a combined population of up to 3.5 million.

The plan also provided for continuous development of the Ring-Radial structure, increasing the number of rings up to seven. The Circular Railway was to be converted to passenger service, as has finally happened in 2016.
