= Urban planning in Russia =

Urban and spatial planning in the Russian Federation

Urban planning in Russia is the practice of urban planning according to Russian Federation legislation and is influenced by various factors such as historical legacy, traditions, geography and climate and involves various actors including the federal as well as regional and local governments. The direct translation to Russian is Gradoplanirovaniye (Russian: Градопланирование) but also common is the term Gradostraitelstvo (Russian: Градостроительство) which literally translated as urban construction.

== History ==
During the Kievan Rus' period, settlements which were located in strategic places, such as confluence of rivers or sitting on important routes grew in importance and transformed into towns. Concurrently they became gravity center of political, economic and military power. From the 10th century markets and handicraft trade developed, a process which contributed to the growth of towns and around them grew settlements which were suburbs of the core town, gravitated towards them and were called (Posad). In some cases, cities of Kievan Rus' had radial structure made of two parts, one is the Kremlin and the other the Posad. In connection with these processes the number of dwellers in towns increased. These cities of the Kievan Rus' military fortifications built by the princes so that the population can escape there in case of Nomadic raids. The core city fortresses, known as Kremlin were built in strategic places, elevated from its surroundings, often located in the confluence of rivers or lakes. The Kremlins were not only the fortress itself but a defined area in the city center which gathered in it range of buildings of political, religious and social importance. While some were built from wood, they were later rebuilt from stone and were surrounded by moats and earthworks fortifications. In the case of Veliky Novgorod, one of the important cities of ancient Russia, streets were built from north to south and sometimes several buildings were connected to each other forming voids between them. In Ryazan, after 1350, there was a change in the trend of urban planning with clearer divisions based on social status and professional affiliation, which implied on a politically strong prince.

Following the formation of the centralized Russian state and its military as well as its expansion towards the east, new military-defensive towns and cities which were constructed in the newly aquuired lands.

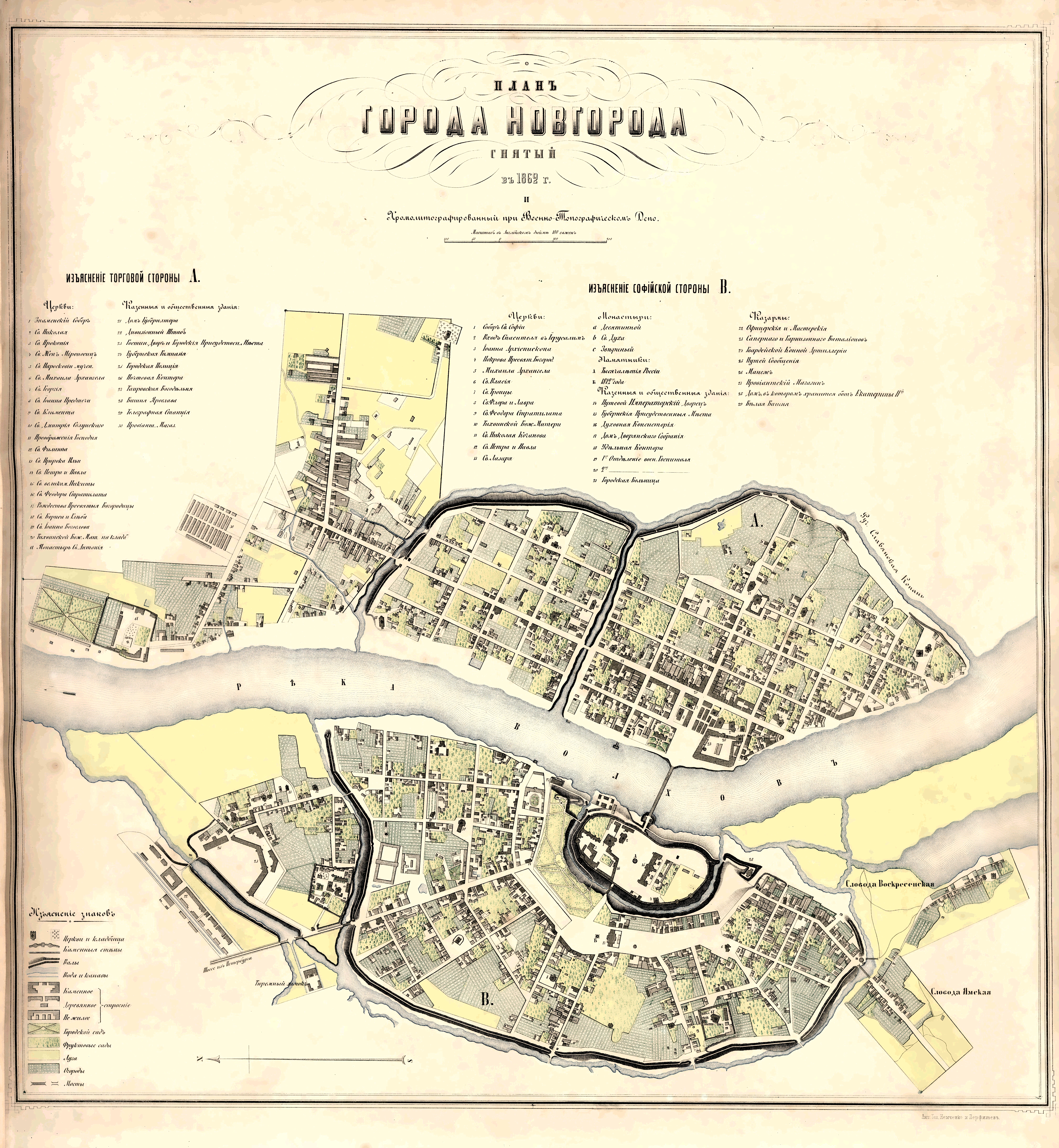
City plan of Veliky Novgorod, dating 1862

The emergence of new cities continued further in the 16th century and 17th century, during the Tsardom of Russia, and during the second half of the 16th century 50 new cities appeared, while by the mid 17th century there were 254 cities in total, of them about 180 had status of Possad. Yet, urban planning concepts and regulations such as location of the buildings relatively to the terrian, sufficient distance between them and accurate parcellation were not integral part of the system. Following the rise to power of Peter I the Great and his Far-fledging reforms, urban planning system in the Russian Empire went through major overhaul with the introduction of new concepts and regulations. Those reforms occurred altogether with the enhancing of the regional and local administration system On 16 January 1721, Articles of Chief Magistrate were published, which laid down the basics principles of city types categorization, ranking them by parameters of geographic location and population. Another major change occurred in the first half of the 18th century with the rising of the "regularity" concept, which called for creation of grid plan cities with emphasized ensembles and geometry trend. The city plans which came into force from now on were geometrically lined, creating perpendicular streets, which was influenced, among others by the philosophy of Descartes by the French military engineer Sebastien Vauban. New city plans were signed off for different cities throughout the Russian Empire such as Tver, Tula, Kaluga, Kostroma, Kolomna, Vladimir, Yaroslavl and Yekaterinburg. The urban planning went into much more details with Emperor Peter the Great, Catherine the Great and Alexander I have put their signatures on various general city plans which regulated the width of central streets, straightened streets and called for high level of aesthetics and composition. The city plans were developed by various architects and planners, among them William Heste, Matvey Kazakov, Ivan Starov, Vasily Bazhenov, Petr Nikitin and others.

=== Soviet period ===
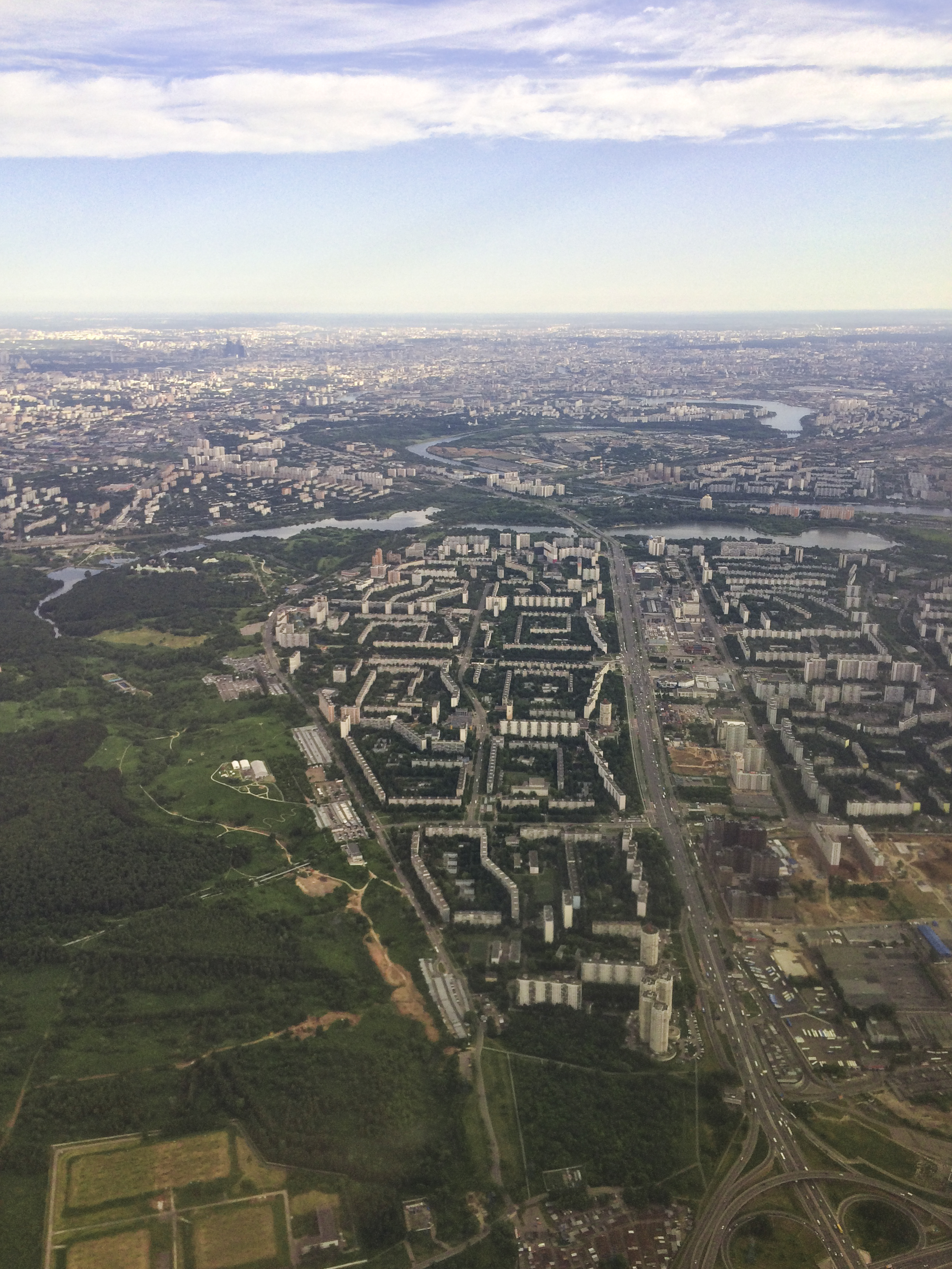
Typical Moscow suburb built during Soviet period with highly-dense microdistricts separated by radial roads

Following the October Revolution and the establishment of the Soviet Union, urban planning in Soviet Russia went through massive changes. Huge emphasis was given to the creation of industrial base and urbanization with mass influx of populations from rural areas to the cities. Old cities grew and expanded beyond their historical borders and completely new cities created from scratch. The Soviet government distanced itself from the old concepts inherited from the Tsarist period and already in 1918, a decree which abolished private ownership in urban areas came into force, practically municipalizing and nationalizing large parts of the housing stocks. While the Soviet government called for the upbringing of the workers and farmers at the expense of the old bourgeoisie, even by 1925 there was no centrally imposed, unified concept of urban planning. Formulating steps were taken in the form of the enactment of the Statue on Urban Land Management of 13 April 1925 which laid down the foundations of the urban planning system which placed the lands and the city plans under the jurisdiction of the city councils which had the authority to issue construction leases based on it. The 1920s and 1930s saw many reforms related to urban planning and new master plans (city plans) for urban settlements across Russia and the other republics of the Soviet Union with the help of large design institutes, among them Moscow-based Giprogor Russian Institute of Urban and Investment Development, Leningrad-based Russian State Research and Design Institute of Urbanism, Gorstroyproyekt (Russian: Горстройпроект) and Giprograd (Russian: Гипроград). Noteworthy is the Moscow 1935 Master Plan. Another major law regulating and directing the urban planning in the country was the All-Union Law On Regional and City PLanning and law On Preparation and Approval of Plans for Design and Socialist Reconstruction of Cities and Other Populated Places adopted in 1933. The Soviet government pushed for regulation and uniformity of planning and design, standardizing the rules and centrally imposed concepts to all the republics of the Soviet Union. Settlements were planned and treated as centrally planned component being part of the national economic system, often destroying the uniqueness of them in favour of standardization.

The Second World War halted many of the urban planning activities as the authorities have allocated the entire resources to the war efforts, urbanization especially in cities deeper in Russia continued, as a result of the relocation of factories into them, which led to the relocation of population employed in those factories and the construction of new workers' settlements around those cities. As the war management consumed most of Stalin's time and efforts, urban planning decision which previously were handled by him, were not taken care by Chairman of the Presidium of the Supreme Soviet, Mikhail Kalinin. Already before the end of the war, in 1943, city planners began proposing their concepts for the rebuilding of the cities destroyed in the fighting, such as Volgograd.

After the war urban planning politics continued again, alongside the massive reconstruction efforts. The post-war period was marked by active urban planning activities related to the transformation of the historically established settlements together with the emergence of new cities. In order No. 294 of the Committee for Architecture under the Council of Ministers of the USSR issued on 31 March 1949, special attention was paid to improving the quality of design and planning work, city planning projects. The importance of urban improvement and the introduction of standard projects was emphasized. The meeting of the Central Committee of the CPSU and the Council of Ministers of the USSR convened an All-Union Conference of Builders and City Planners. The meeting which took place in April 1958 discussed the pressing problems of planning and urban development and outlined ways to solve them. In 1959, the relevance of this problem at the 22nd Congress of the CPSU was emphasized by Khrushchev, who advocated for the massive construction of pre-fabricated apartment buildings of 5 floors and nicknamed Khrushchevka, designed by the architect Vitaly Lagutenko to overcome to extreme housing deficit. In May 1961 the Third All-Union Congress of Soviet Architects convened and called for accelerating the approval of general city plans. The general tendencies from the 1960s until the dissolution of the Soviet Union saw continued expansion of the outer areas of the cities with construction of even higher apartment buildings nicknamed Brezhnevki.

=== Russian Federation ===
==== 1991–2000 ====
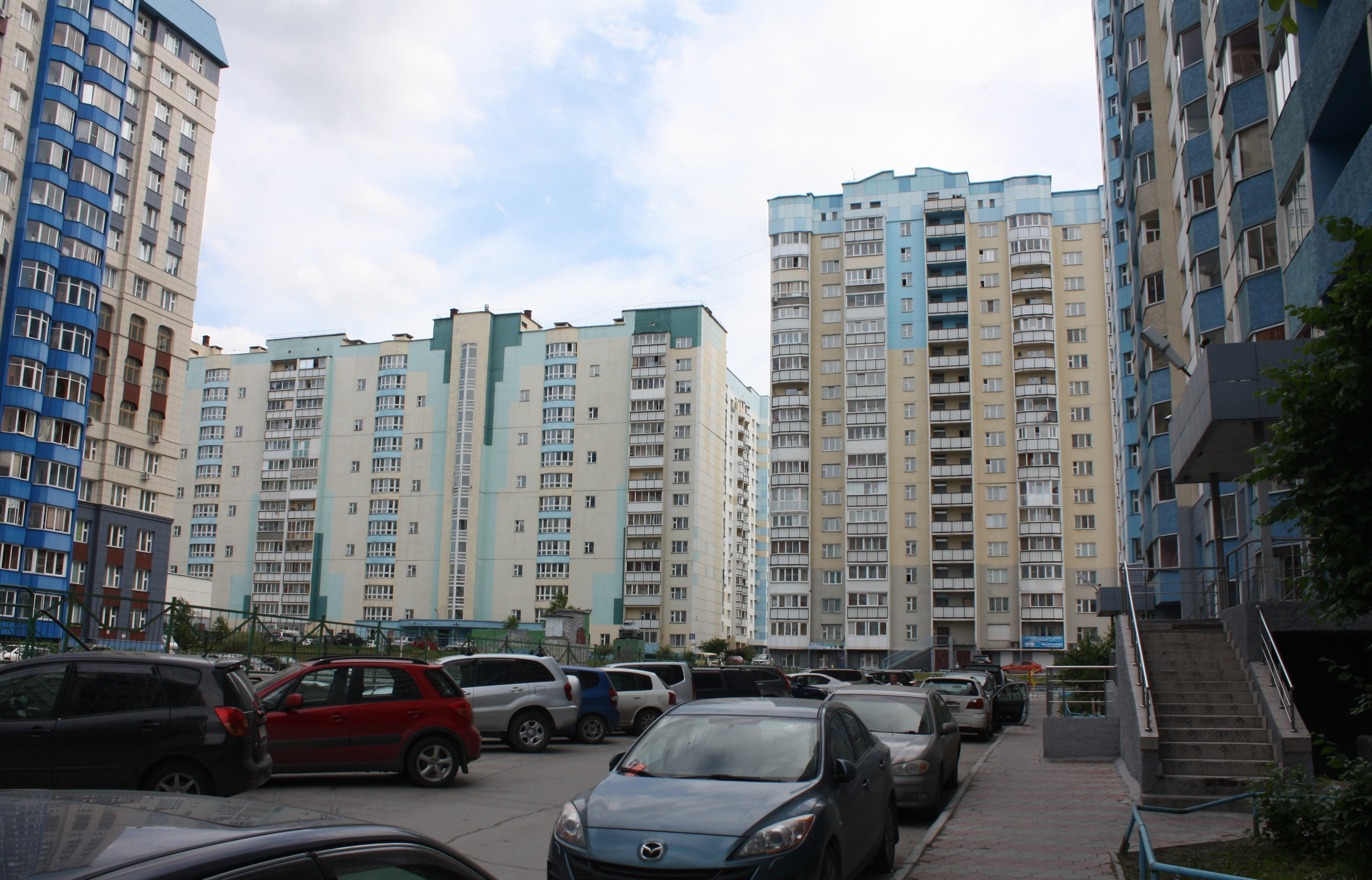
Gorsky Microdistrict in Novosibirsk

Following the dissolution of the Soviet Union in December 1991, urban planning system in Russia went through dramatic change. Due to the country's move to a more liberalized, market economy, the political preferences and direction for the urban planning has changed as well with the state needed to address marketization and regionalization issues. The economic policies implemented by successive Russian governments in that period led to spatial inequality by which certain groups in a given city experienced increase in their district while other groups experienced sharp decline. The country went through major changes including in its urban planning system and the ideological layer, of constructing a Socialist city was eliminated, yet the planning pattern of the Soviet period which implied construction of tall buildings with high density continued as in the Soviet period, though with more emphasis on leisure and aesthetics in later periods. In the 1990s–2000s, the rush demand for housing in large cities led to an increase in the height and density of buildings. In all major cities of Russia, 25 or more storey residential buildings began to be built. The so-called "densification development" has become widespread, which increases the load on urban infrastructure and negatively affects the aesthetics of the urban environment. The extensive growth of built-up urban areas and urban sprawl due to the reproduction of Soviet microdistrict development also continued. Another trend is the construction of residential and office real estate in former industrial zones. The economic liberalization also led to the growth of street markets and retail trade activities, either regulated or not.

== Settlement patterns ==
While Russia is the largest country on earth, its population is spread unevenly on the territory. Three-fourths of Russia's territory is located in Siberia, Asia, while one-fourth is located in European Russia, west of the Ural Mountains, but the population distribution is the opposite, with 75% of the country's population is located at the western, European part of the country, and only about 15 million is located east of the Ural Mountains. The main settlement zone in European Russia had formed in accordance with the patterns of the development of industry and transport route, in cities between Moscow and Saint Petersburg. Nefedova specifies five main zones of settlement and urbanization pattern:

- Poorly developed territory – This zone is a large external periphery. It went through rapid forced development 1920s to the 1960s using the Gulag system. During the 1970s and 1980s people were attracted to these areas due to the higher average salaries. Following dissolution of the Soviet Union, severe economic depression hit these areas and led to massive emigration to the western and southern areas. Those centers are now regional capitals or settlements associated with oil and gas production, especially in the northern part of Western Siberia.
- Zone of focal and linear selective development with forestry and mining – This area stretches out on a wide strip starting from the White Sea and Barents Sea located in the north west to the Sea of Okhotsk and Sea of Japan located in the east. There are 11 large cities around which small areas of suburban agriculture is formed. The other settlements are small and built around transport, fishing, mining and timber industry in the deep Taiga. The settlements or clusters of settlements are separated by vast territories of empty space.
- Zone of mosaic industrial-urban and small-scale agricultural development – This area covers the rest of the non-Chernozem zone and the taiga-steppe transition zone. It occupies about 13% of the country's territory, from Leningrad to Smolensk Oblast in the west to the southern Russian Far East. It is home to 53% of Russia's urban population and about 30% of its rural population. The country's main industrial backbone is located here in more than 70 large cities, of which about 20 located in Moscow Oblast. This zone suffers from high disparity between large and small cities in terms of infrastructure and development. The territory consists of the inner periphery between large cities with small towns suffering from depopulation and low density of rural population.
- Zone of agricultural-urban development – This zone includes the flatlands in the Kursk-Krasnodar-Krasnoyarsk triangle. It is stretched in European Russia and much more compressed in Siberia. The large cities are more equally spaced. It is more developed, and its provinces have lower socioeconomic gaps.
- Mountain and foothill areas – This zone includes the North Caucasian and Siberian regions. The zone is the very periphery of the country both politically and economically.

Within the different regions, during the last decades, the rise of agglomarations has taken place which takes places concurrently with the de-population of villages and small towns, thus mass immigration of people from small towns and villages to larger cities, with the boldest example of Moscow. Agglomarations grow as the built-up areas of core cities and nearby settlements adjoins. Most of the agglomarations are located in European Russia rather than in Siberia or the Russian Far East. While the Soviet government encouraged urbanization as part of the mass industrialization, shifting the population from being employed in agriculture in rural areas to industry, mainly heavy one, it also controlled the cities' population, encouraging the spreading of the population and creating huge number of small and mid-sized cities (among them Urban-type settlements). The creation of the urban agglomarations is a process that gathered pace after the dissolution of the Soviet Union and is a result of liberalization of the country's resident registration system which made it easier to move from one place to another, both trends rising from below, mainly people searching access to better paid jobs and higher quality public utilities, and encouruged by the federal government to cut costs, increasing effectiveness and optimizing transport and infrastructure development.

Another aspect which characterizes the settlement patterns in Russia is the existence of monotowns and closed cities which are located throughout the country, especially in remote areas with harsh climate or limited infrastructure, are based around single factory associated with heavy industry or defense industry. Their establishment and planning was not based on logical, economic and spatial considerations such as proximity to transport routes or continuation of existing urban areas. In an effort to tackle the economic problem of these types of cities, the Russian Government compelled in 2014 a list of 319 mono towns and divided them into three sub-groups by socio-economic risk: high, medium and low. It also created the Monotown Development Fund as a tool for the development and regulations of these cities in the years to come.

== Urban structure ==
Many of the cities in contemporary Russia have a centralized structure, a legacy of Soviet planning which tended to emphasize the public areas in city center with concentration of governmental and commercial as well as other public functions. Around the very city center are the old periphery districts which have mixture of commercial, residential and transport use. These districts include brick houses and tenement buildings built in the late tsarist period as well as buildings built during Soviet times. In recent decades they are going through waves of reconstruction and gentrification. Around them are vast mono-functional districts which contain residential areas (microdistrict) and industrial areas mainly of heavy industry, in accordance with the concentric zone model of urban land use, with radiating out wide, geometrically lined roads separating between them. While the built-up area in the cities is generally dense, some spots of old wooden housing and dacha remain.

Old cities, which were built around a Kremlin, have a clear "old city" part, or a distinctive city center, while cities that were built from scratch or grew from small villages do not have a clear historical core and are more uniform in their urban layout and architecture. Many cities in Russia have high dispersion index which indicates the effectiveness of the distribution pattern across the administrative borders of the city.

The large cities are characterized by wide arteries separating between districts, containing a peculiar street patterns with low share of street and road network and internal streets which are mostly not connected to the main streets. While all cities in Russia grew and expanded significantly during the early Soviet period with the annexation of surrounded villages and construction of industry and housing at the suburbs, different conditions specific to each city that determined their different urban layout, being more compact or sprawling. Savelyeva divided them into three groups: Extended urban structure, which includes Volgograd, Ufa and Perm, Discrete urban structure which includes Novosibirsk, Kazan, Krasnoyarsk and Nizhny Novgorod and Compact which includes Chelyabinsk, Yekaterinburg, Omsk, Voronezh and Rostov-on-Don.

== Legal framework ==
Russia inherited from the Soviet Union a complex system of urban planning. At the top is the Urban Development Code of the Russian Federation (Russian: Градостроительный Кодекс Российской Федерации), adopted on 29 December 2004 and later amended. The document is used as an umbrella tool which lays down the general concepts. Beneath it are Territorial Comprehensive Schemes and district schemes at the regional and district level. At the municipal level there are city plans (Russian: Генеральный план) prepared by the respective planning departments of the city halls and which are then approved by the city councils and at the lowest leve, even more detailed plan for specific territory (Russian: Градостроительный план земельного участка). The master plan (general city plan) is approved by the city council (local parliament) and is the highest binding legal tool within the framework of local legislation concerning urban planning. The town planning regulations is a description specifying the types and parameters of the use of land plots and other objects within a certain territory (zoning).

== See also ==
- Architecture of Russia
- Town Planning Code of Russia
- Urban planning in communist countries
