= Historical city of Russia =

Historical cities and settlements of Russia (Russian: исторические города и поселения) are settlements of historical and archaeological importance in Russia, as defined by Russian governments from a 1970 decree through a 2002 federal law.

== History of official designations ==
The official definition of this status was first decreed in the Soviet Union in May 1970, when the first official list of 115 historical settlements was declared. It was confirmed in the Russian SFSR in February 1990, with a significantly expanded list of 426 cities/towns, 54 urban-type settlements, and 56 villages. On June 25, 2002, the federal law of Russia, #73-FZ, On the Objects of Cultural Heritage (Cultural and Historical Monuments) of the Peoples of Russian Federation confirmed this status for 478 settlements. In 2010, the list was revised and only 41 cities remained in it. In 2016, Sevastopol was added to the list.

Historical cities in Russia are separated into four categories based on the value of their historical legacy:

- Category I: historical cities of worldwide importance, the unique legacy of which is recognised by the world community and requires exceptional efforts to conserve.
- Category II: historical cities of local importance, the legacy of which requires development of special reconstruction projects and multifactor conservation programmes.
- Category III: historical cities of local importance, the legacy of which makes them stand out of the rest of the list.
- Category IV: other historical cities.

== The current list ==
- Azov
- Arzamas
- Astrakhan
- Belozersk
- Veliky Ustyug
- Verkhoturye
- Vladimir
- Volsk
- Vyborg
- Galich
- Gorokhovets
- Derbent
- Yelabuga
- Yelets
- Yeniseysk
- Zaraysk
- Irkutsk
- Kasimov
- Kargopol
- Kineshma
- Kolomna
- Kostroma
- Krapivna, Tula Oblast
- Kyakhta
- Ostashkov
- Plyos
- Rostov
- Saint Petersburg
- Sevastopol
- Smolensk
- Solvychegodsk
- Starocherkasskaya
- Suzdal
- Taganrog
- Tomsk
- Torzhok
- Toropets
- Totma
- Tutayev
- Chistopol
- Shuya
- Yaroslavl

== See also ==
- Golden Ring of cities northeast of Moscow, Russia
- Russian history
