= Lev Ilyin =

Russian architect

- Лев Александрович Ильин
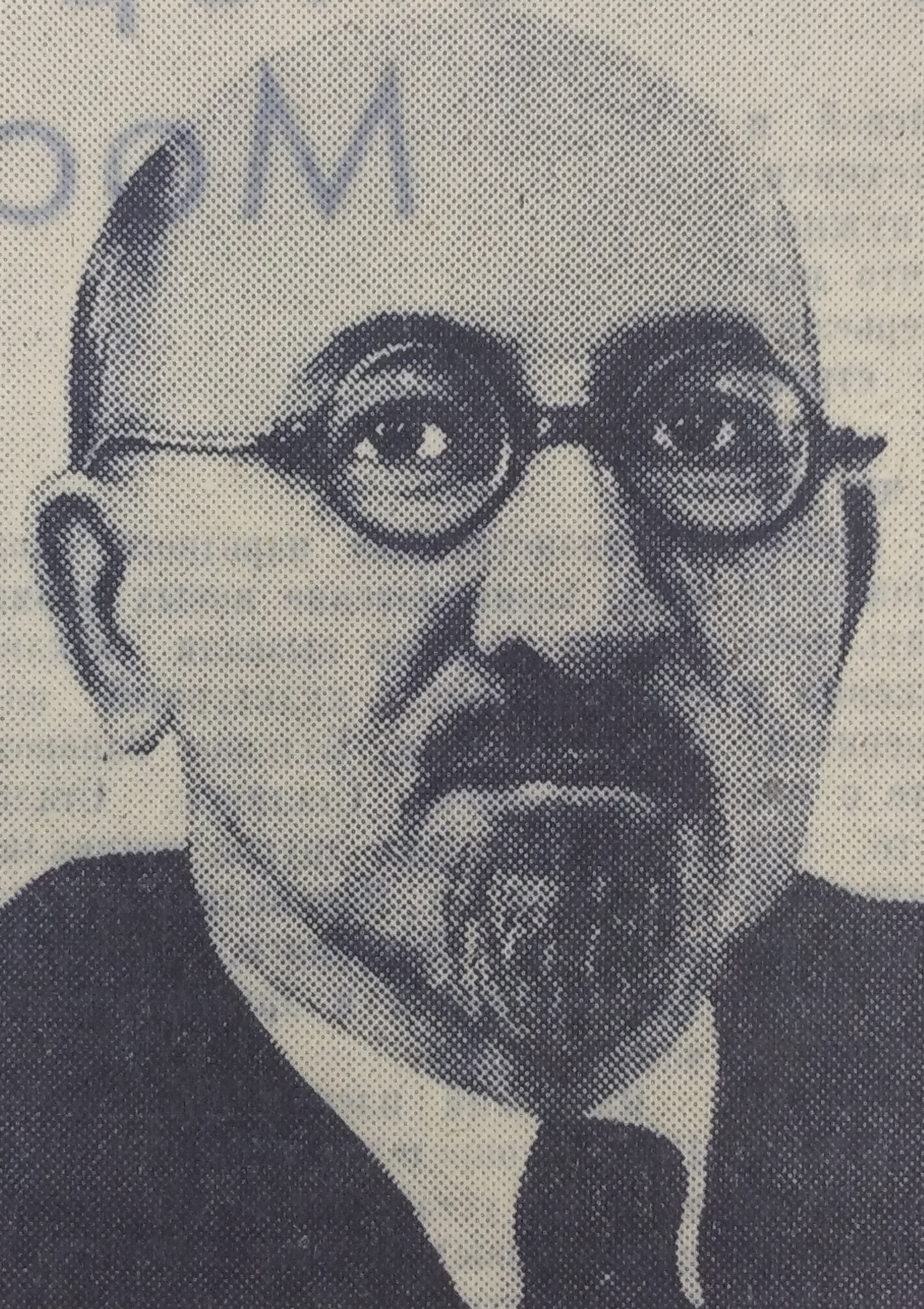
- Born: 25 June 1879; Moscow, RSFSR
- Died: December 11, 1942 (aged 63); Saint Petersburg
- Citizenship: Soviet, Russian
- Education: Alexandrovsky Cadet Corps
- Occupation: Architect
- Projects: City plan of Saint Petersburg

Lev Aleksandrovich Ilyin (Russian: Лев Александрович Ильин; 1880 in Tambov Governorate, Russian Empire – 1942) was an architect from the Soviet Union.

Between 1925 and 1938 Lev Ilyin was the main architect of Leningrad (now Saint Petersburg), and an author of the overall map of Leningrad and material in the sphere of town-planning. He served as the general director of the Russian State Research and Design Institute of Urbanism.

During the Siege of Leningrad, Ilyin died during a German bombing raid.
