= Adam Vishnyakov =

Russian footballer

Personal information
- Full name: Adam Nikolayevich Vishnyakov
- Date of birth: 24 February 1991 (age 35)
- Place of birth: Vologda, Russian SFSR
- Height: 1.82 m (5 ft 11 1/2 in)
- Position: Forward

Youth career
- FC Master-Saturn Yegoryevsk

Senior career*
Years	Team	Apps	(Gls)
2008	FC Shinnik Yaroslavl	0	(0)
2009	FC Shinnik-2 Yaroslavl	0	(0)
2010–2012	FC Shinnik Yaroslavl	2	(0)
2010	→ FC Dynamo Kostroma (loan)	14	(4)
- * Club domestic league appearances and goals

Adam Nikolayevich Vishnyakov (Russian: Адам Николаевич Вишняков; born 24 February 1991) is a former Russian professional football player.

== Club career ==
He made his Russian Football National League debut for FC Shinnik Yaroslavl on 21 April 2010 in a game against FC Nizhny Novgorod.
