= Vologda butter =

Russian butter

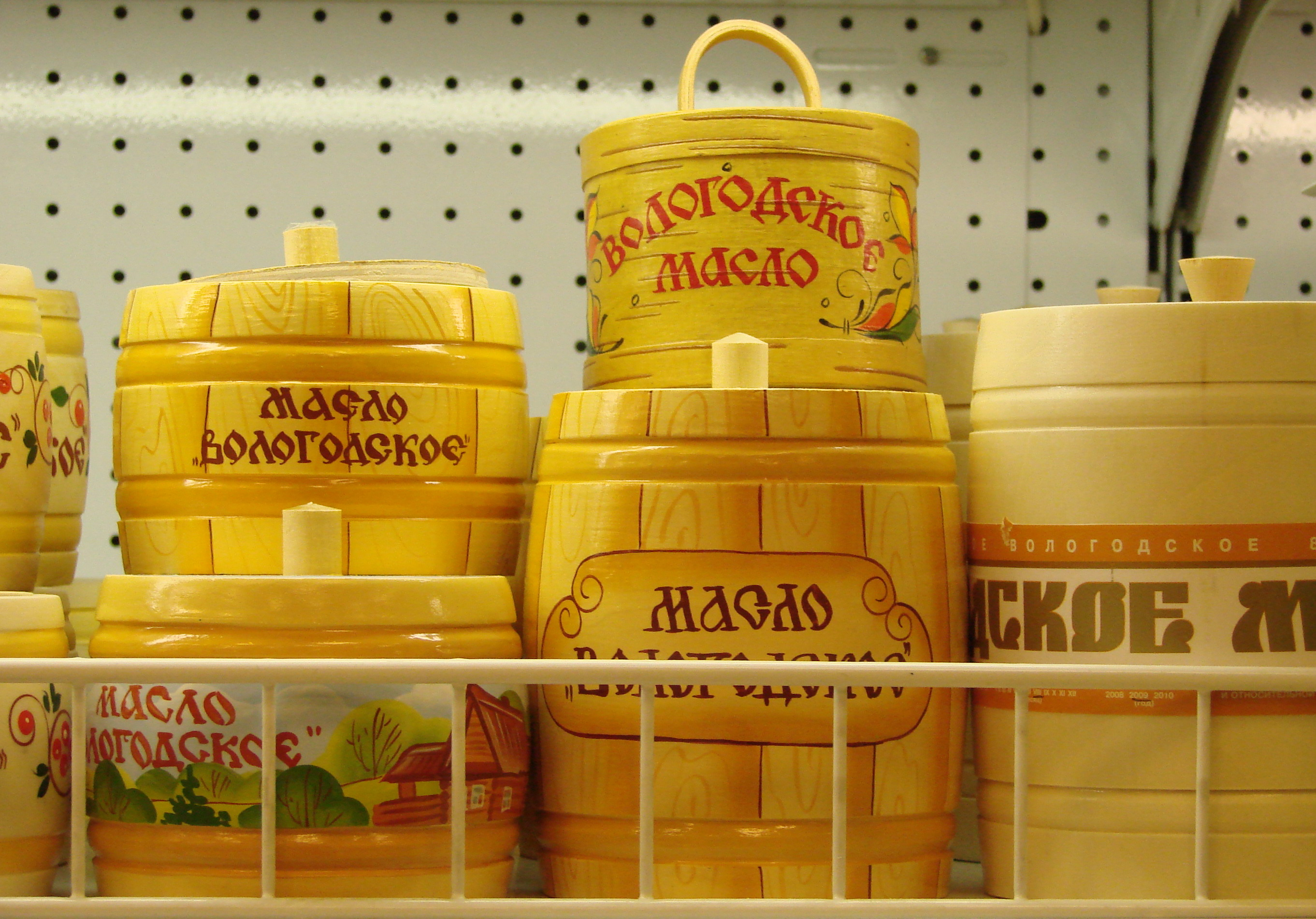
Vologda butter

Vologda butter, or Vologodskoye Maslo (Russian: Волого́дское ма́сло), formerly known as Parisian butter, is a type of butter made in the Vologda region of Russia, known for its sweet, creamy and nutty flavor. The unique flavour comes from its specific set of requirements which monitor the temperature of the milk throughout different stages of the process.

== History ==
The process used to create Vologda butter was invented by Nikolai Vasilievich Vereshchagin, the older brother of war artist Vasily Vereshchagin. He was inspired by tasting "Norman butter", from the Normandy region of France, at the 1867 Paris Exposition.

After several years of producing the butter, Vereshchagin took his product to the 1878 Paris Exposition, where it won a gold medal. He then labelled his butter "Parisian butter", and it became known as a delicacy in both Russia and Europe.

A factory to produce the butter was built in 1916. In 1917, after the Russian Revolution, the factory was taken over by the state, and production decreased. Later, export of it was banned. In 1939, authorities renamed it to Vologda butter. In 1991, after the fall of the Soviet Union, private factories in Vologda started up to again produce Vologda butter for export.

In 2010, after years of rampant counterfeiting, the Russian government declared that only butter created in the Vologda region would be allowed to be labelled as Vologda butter, creating Russia's first-ever protected designation of origin.

== See also ==
- List of Russian dishes
