= One-day votive church =

Type of medieval Russian church

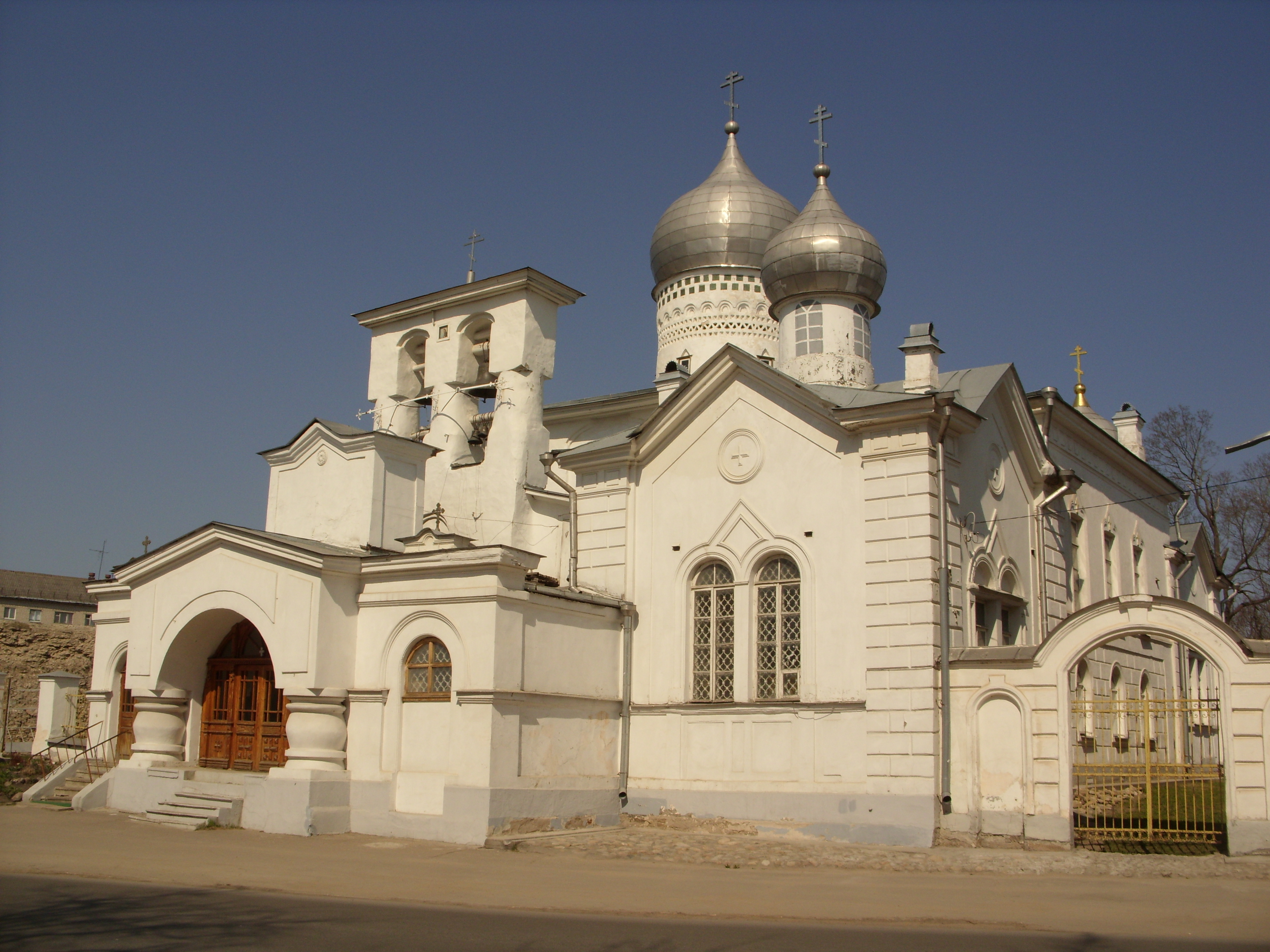
St Varlaam church in Pskov was built during a pestilence in one day in 1466 and was replaced by a stone building (pictured) in 1495.

One-day votive churches (Russian: обыденная церковь, obydennaya tserkov) were churches built in medieval Russia to ward off epidemics.

== Description ==
The one-day votive churches were built in one day from wood. They were simple in design and small in size, and usually lasted a limited time. The construction could start during the preceding night but had to be finished, and the church consecrated, before nightfall.

Usually these churches were erected on a site where no previous structure had stood and were built through communal labour. Such votive churches were believed to be effective against epidemics because none of the evil forces responsible for the pandemic could enter the churches during their uninterrupted construction.

Most of these churches were built in Novgorod, Pskov (nine churches between 1407 and 1532) and Muscovy in the 14th through 17th centuries, with both cities and rulers financing the construction.

According to Russell Zguta, the appearance of such churches is a uniquely Russian response to the Black Death, and he compares them to the Western European response, which also involved religious rites, votive objects and churches.

The tradition declined and eventually disappeared as more rational anti-plague measures were gradually enacted. The tradition of building churches in one day was linked with the Belarusian custom of weaving votive towels in one day to prevent or fight epidemics among livestock.

No such churches have survived; however, there are several churches originally constructed in one day and later rebuilt in stone: Vsegradsky Cathedral in Vologda (the name meaning '[constructed] by all of the town'), St. Simeon Church in Novgorod and St. Varlaam Church in Pskov.
