= Vsegradsky cathedral (Vologda) =

- The Vsegradsky cathedral
- Всеградский Обыденный собор во имя Спаса Всемилостивого
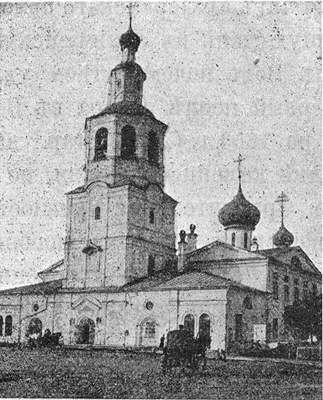
- The cathedral in the early 20th century
- Vsegradsky cathedral
- 59°13′09″N 39°53′39″E
- Location: Vologda
- Country: Russia
- Denomination: Christianity

History
- Status: Demolished
- Founded: 1654

Architecture
- Years built: 1688—1698
- Closed: 1924
- Demolished: 1972

The Vsegradsky cathedral (originally Спасо-Всегра́дский собо́р) was one of the main historical monuments in Vologda, Russia. It was rebuilt from a wooden church between 1688 and 1698, which was established after a severe plague outbreak in 1654. The cathedral had the revered icon "Saviour, the Most Merciful (everyday)".

== History ==
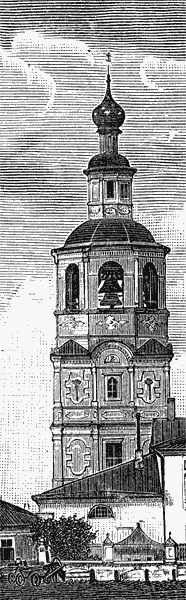
The bell tower of the Spasovsegradsky Temple, print by M. Rashevsky

=== Construction ===
The first wooden church was built on 18 October 1654, following the Russian tradition of 'one-day' churches. Such buildings were constructed in one single day by all of the citizens, and thus thought to be pure from evil and disease. The church in Vologda was aimed to free the city from the plague outbreak, which lasted for seven weeks and took many lives. When the church was finished, the plague stopped. Amazed by this, the citizens asked a local icon painter to create an icon in gratitude of God's mercy. The icon was also created in one day and became the most important relic in the city.

The name Vsegradsky translated from Russian means 'by the whole town', because the money and the effort for its construction were given by all the citizens.

In 1688 the small church could no longer hold all the pilgrims, so it was rebuilt in stone on top of the wooden skeleton. Meanwhile, the church remained active and the liturgical services were continued. The construction was finished in 1691, but due to an unknown reason in 1692 the cathedral collapsed. It was rebuilt in 1698 and in 1718 the interiors were decorated with frescoes.

In the 19th century the cathedral was changed several times; gradually it completely lost its original view. In 1840–1842 the refectory and the 'warm' church were rebuilt. In 1851–1853 the building underwent a full-scale reconstruction when all the frescoes were repainted, the altar enlarged, the windows widened and the floors replaced.

=== Closure ===
- Tank demolishing the church in 1972

The cathedral was closed in 1924, and after 1925 the building was used as an art centre. In 1932 it was redeveloped into a cinema with two movie halls. In 1971–1972 it was destroyed. Tanks were used for demolition because the 16th-century walls were too thick for demolition charges.

== Restoration projects ==
In 2015 the Metropolitan Ignatius announced a restoration project. However, according to the representatives of the Diocese of Vologda, the idea is to construct a temporary wooden church at the site of the demolished cathedral.

== 21st century ==
In 2000 a memorial cross was installed at the site of the demolished cathedral.

In 2021 a lime tree planted in the cathedral's yard in 1895 was registered in the national register of protected old trees as a living monument of nature.

== Gallery ==
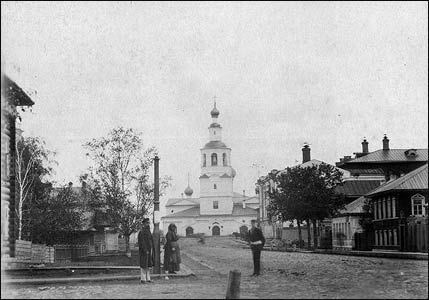
The cathedral in 1887

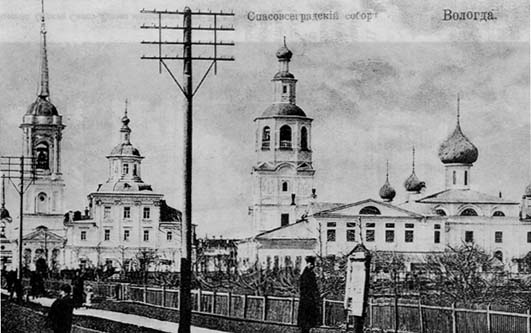
The cathedral before 1917

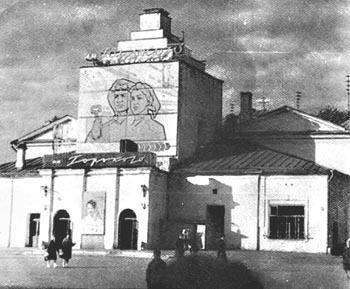
The cathedral, rebuilt into a cinema hall, mid-20th century

== Sources ==
- Vinogradova, E. A.; Fedyshin, I. N.; Fedyshin, N. N. (2013). "Икона из Вологодского Спасо-Всеградского собора "Спас Всемилостивый (Обыденный)" и её списки в собрании Вологодского музея-заповедника" [The Icon «Saviour, the Most Merciful (everyday)» and Its Copies in the Collection of Vologda Museum]. Вестник Псковского Государственного Университета. Серия: Социально-Гуманитарные Науки (in Russian) (2). Vologda: Pskov State University: 188–202.
- Malevinsky, A. (1866). Сказание о милости Божией и о создании храма во имя Господа Бога и Спаса нашего Иисуса Христа, в городе Вологде, ради избавления его от смертоносной язвы [The Legend of God’s Mercy in Rescue Vologda from Plague and the Creation of Vsegradsky cathedral]. Vologda State Museum Archives.
