= Rybkino railway station =

Railway station in Russia

Rybkino

General information
- Location: Russia
- Coordinates: 59°15′54″N 39°53′52″E
- Owner: Russian Railways
- Operator: Russian Railways

Construction
- Parking: Available

Other information
- Status: Functioning
- Station code: 30050
- Fare zone: Northwestern Federal District

History
- Opened: 1914
Location

Rybkino (Russian: Рыбкино) is a railway station for freight trains near Vologda, Russia. It is located on Northern Railway.
