= Vologda =

City in Vologda Oblast, Russia

Vologda Вологда
- City
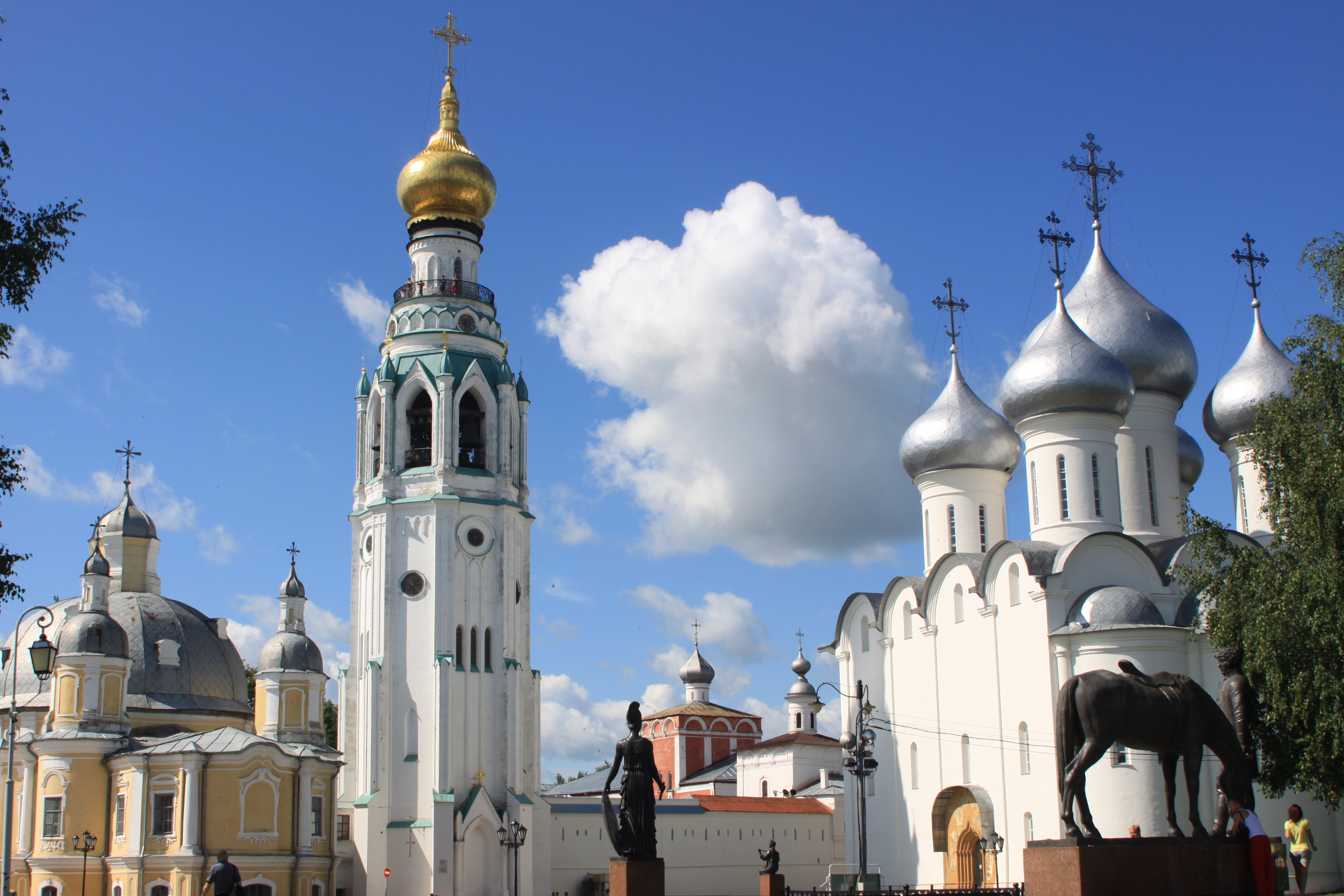
- Kremlin Square in Vologda

- Flag Coat of arms
- Interactive map of Vologda
- Location of Vologda Vologda (Russia) Vologda (European Russia) Vologda (Europe)
- Coordinates: 59°13′N 39°54′E
- Country: Russia
- Federal subject: Vologda Oblast
- First mentioned: 1147

Government
  - Body: City Duma
  - Head: Yury Sapozhnikov

Area
  - Total: 116 km^{2} (45 sq mi)
- Elevation: 120 m (390 ft)

Population (2010 Census)
  - Total: 301,755
  - Estimate (2025): 311,476 (+3.2%)
  - Rank: 63rd in 2010
  - Density: 2,600/km^{2} (6,740/sq mi)

Administrative status
  - Subordinated to: city of oblast significance of Vologda
  - Capital of: Vologda Oblast, Vologodsky District

Municipal status
  - Urban okrug: Vologda Urban Okrug
  - Capital of: Vologodsky Municipal District, Vologda Urban Okrug
- Time zone: UTC+3 (MSK)
- Postal codes: 160000-160530
- Dialing code: +7 8172
- OKTMO ID: 19701000001
- City Day: Last Sunday of June
- Website: vologda-portal.ru/en/

Vologda (Russian: Во́логда, IPA: [ˈvoləɡdə]) is a city and the administrative center of Vologda Oblast, Russia, located on the river Vologda within the watershed of the Northern Dvina. Population: 313,944 (2021 census); 301,755 (2010 census); 293,046 (2002 census); 282,802 (1989 Soviet census).

The city serves as a major transport hub of the Northwest of Russia. The Ministry of Culture of the Russian Federation has classified Vologda as a historic city, one of 41 in Russia and one of only three in Vologda Oblast.

== History ==
=== Foundation ===
The official founding year of Vologda is 1147, based on the 17th century "Tale of Miracles of Gerasimus of Vologda" and Ivan Slobodsky's 1716 "Chronicler", which tells the story of the arrival of the monk Gerasimus who founded the Trinity Monastery near the Vologda river. This date, which would make Vologda about the same age as Moscow, was introduced by the historian Aleksey Zasetsky in 1780.

However, historians and archaeologists have expressed doubts on the official founding year, due to the age and secondary nature of the sources and also due to archaeological excavations dating no earlier than the 13th century. Instead, they believe that the city was founded in the 13th century with Vologda being mentioned in a 1264 agreement between the Novgorod Republic and the Grand Prince of Vladimir as an outlying possession of the Novgorod Republic.

The nucleus of Vologda in the 13th century was not located in the area which is now the city center, but rather the area known now as "Lazy ground" (Ленивая площадка), close to the Resurrection church. This area was the center of Vologda up to 1565. Until that year, no stone constructions existed in Vologda; all of the city fortifications, bridges, houses, churches, and industrial enterprises were made of wood.

=== Early history ===
The unique position of Vologda on important waterways connecting Moscow, Novgorod, and the White Sea (via the Northern Dvina) made it attractive for the Novgorod Republic, as well as for the princes of Tver and Moscow, who fought numerous wars between the 13th and the 15th centuries.

In 1371, Dmitry Prilutsky, a monk from the Nikolsky Monastery in Pereslavl-Zalessky, founded Nikolsky Monastery, now known as Spaso-Prilutsky Monastery, close to the city. Dmitry Donskoy, the Grand Prince of Moscow, was the chief benefactor of the monastery and viewed it as a stronghold of the influence of the Grand Duchy of Moscow in the Northern lands in competition with Novgorod.

In 1397, during the reign of Vasily I, Vologda was added to the Grand Duchy of Moscow. Subsequently, the city was several times attacked by Novgorod forces. During the Muscovite Civil War, Vologda played a key role. After Vasily II the Blind, the Grand Prince of Moscow, was defeated by Dmitry Shemyaka in 1447, he swore to never start a war against Shemyaka, was exiled to Vologda, and got the city as a personal possession. From there Vasily traveled to the Kirillo-Belozersky Monastery where the hegumen released him from the oath. The civil war continued, and in 1450, Vologda was besieged by the troops of Dmitry Shemyaka; however, they did not manage to occupy the town.

After the death of Vasily in 1462, Vologda passed to the possession of his son Andrey Menshoy and became the center of the Principality of Vologda. In 1481, after the death of Andrey who had no successors, Vologda passed to Ivan III, the Grand Duke of Moscow, and was included to the Grand Duchy of Moscow.

=== Under Ivan the Terrible ===
During the reign of Tsar Ivan the Terrible, Vologda became one of the major transit centers of Russia's trade. The foreign trade was conducted mostly with England, Holland, and other western countries via the White Sea. Arkhangelsk was the major foreign trade haven, and Vologda stood on the waterway connecting Moscow with Arkhangelsk. The trade with Siberia was conducted via the Sukhona and the Vychegda, and Vologda also played an important role as a transit center. The state courtyard was built in the city on the bank of the Vologda. In 1553, Vologda was visited by the English seafarer Richard Chancellor who officially established diplomatic relations between the Tsardom of Russia and England. In 1554, trading agent John Gass described Vologda to English merchants as a city with an abundance of bread where the goods were twice as cheap as in Moscow and Novgorod, and that there was no city in Russia that would not trade with Vologda. Following the reports of John Gass, in 1555 England opened a trading office in the city, and the first Russian ambassador sent to England for negotiations became Osip Nepeya, a native of Vologda.

In 1565, Ivan the Terrible introduced the policy of Oprichnina and included Vologda in the structure of Oprichnina lands. That year, he visited the city for the first time and decided to make it the center of Oprichnina and consequently the capital of the country. The Tsar ordered to build a new fortress. It was decided to build it not in the former town center, but rather in another part of the town, limited on the one side by the river, and on the other side by what are now Leningradskaya, Oktyabrskaya, and Mira Streets. The fortress was surrounded by a moat. Ivan the Terrible traveled to Vologda in person to supervise the foundation of the fortress on April 28, 1566, which was the day to celebrate the memory of Saint Jason (Nason in the Russian tradition) and Saint Sosipater. Therefore, the territory of the fortress located in the new part of Vologda was named the "Nason-gorod" (Nason-town). The other name of the Nason-gorod was the Vologda Kremlin (currently, the name is sometimes referred only as the Bishop's courtyard).

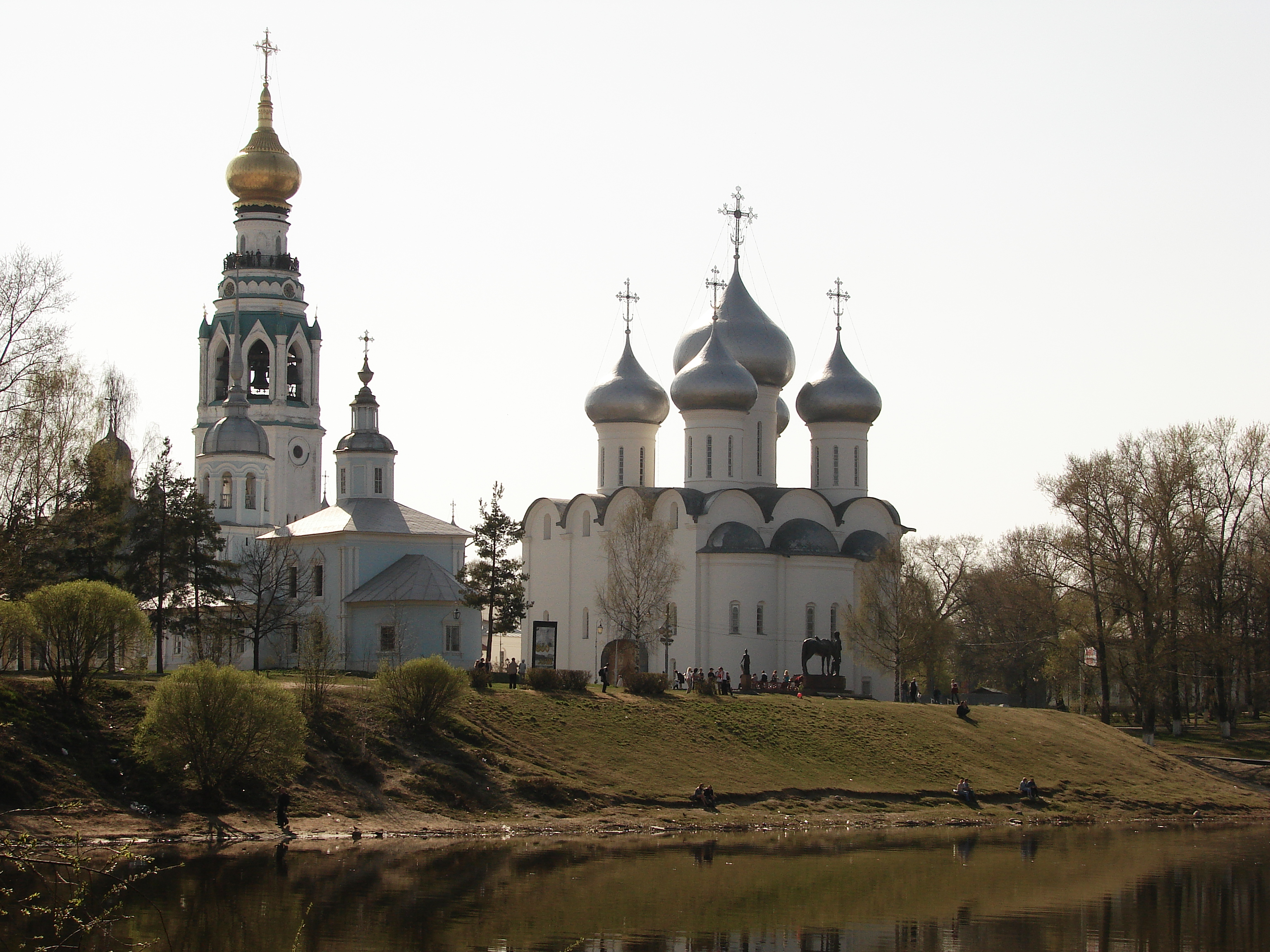
St. Sophia Cathedral

Between 1568 and 1570, a new cathedral was built in the new fortress. The Saint Sophia Cathedral became the first stone building in Vologda. The design of the cathedral copied the Dormition Cathedral of the Moscow Kremlin. This was the idea of Ivan the Terrible who wanted to make his new capital similar to Moscow. He personally supervised the construction, headed by the architect Razmysl Petrov. In 1571, Vologda became the center of the Diocese of Vologda and Perm that was formed in 1492 and previously had its main church in the distant settlement of Ust-Vym in Perm lands. Thereby, Vologda was strengthened not only in trading, military and political influence, but also in ecclesiastical affairs.

However, in 1571 Ivan the Terrible unexpectedly stopped the construction work in Vologda and left the city for good. Presumably, this was connected with his decision to abolish Oprichnina, and Vologda was not needed as the second capital any longer. According to the legend, when Ivan visited the Saint Sophia Cathedral, a little stone fell from the roof on his head. The superstitious Tsar who received a serious head injury took it as a sign of misfortune and decided to leave the city. In any case, it is known that the Tsar wanted even to demolish the cathedral, and that the cathedral was never consecrated during his lifetime. The consecration took place only during the reign his son Feodor I in 1587. Parts of the incomplete fortress which were later in the 17th century strengthened with wooden walls stayed up to the 19th century when they were disassembled by the city authorities and local residents and used as a material for stone building.

=== Time of Troubles ===
The Time of Troubles for Vologda began with a plague epidemic in 1605. In 1608, when Russia was split into areas controlled by Tsar Vasily Shuysky and areas controlled by the pretender False Dmitry II supported by Polish troops, the people of Vologda made an oath to False Dmitry. By gaining Vologda not only did he get control over Russian and English trading warehouses, but he also positioned himself to gain control over northern Russia. However, abuses and property seizures by the new administration sent to Vologda caused extreme discontent among the population. As a result, Vologda denounced False Dmitry II and supported Shuysky. Moreover, in February 1609 a national home guard headed by Nikita Vysheslavtsev was formed in Vologda and went to fight against False Dmitry II.

In 1612, people of Vologda rendered sizable food and military help to the home guard organized by Kuzma Minin and Dmitry Pozharsky, which eventually defeated Polish troops. However, after the city sent huge military forces to support the second home guard, it remained without sufficient protection, and on September 22, 1612 one of the Lithuanian extortionate groups seized Vologda without resistance, later burning down the city and killing and imprisoning many of its inhabitants.

=== Under the Romanovs ===
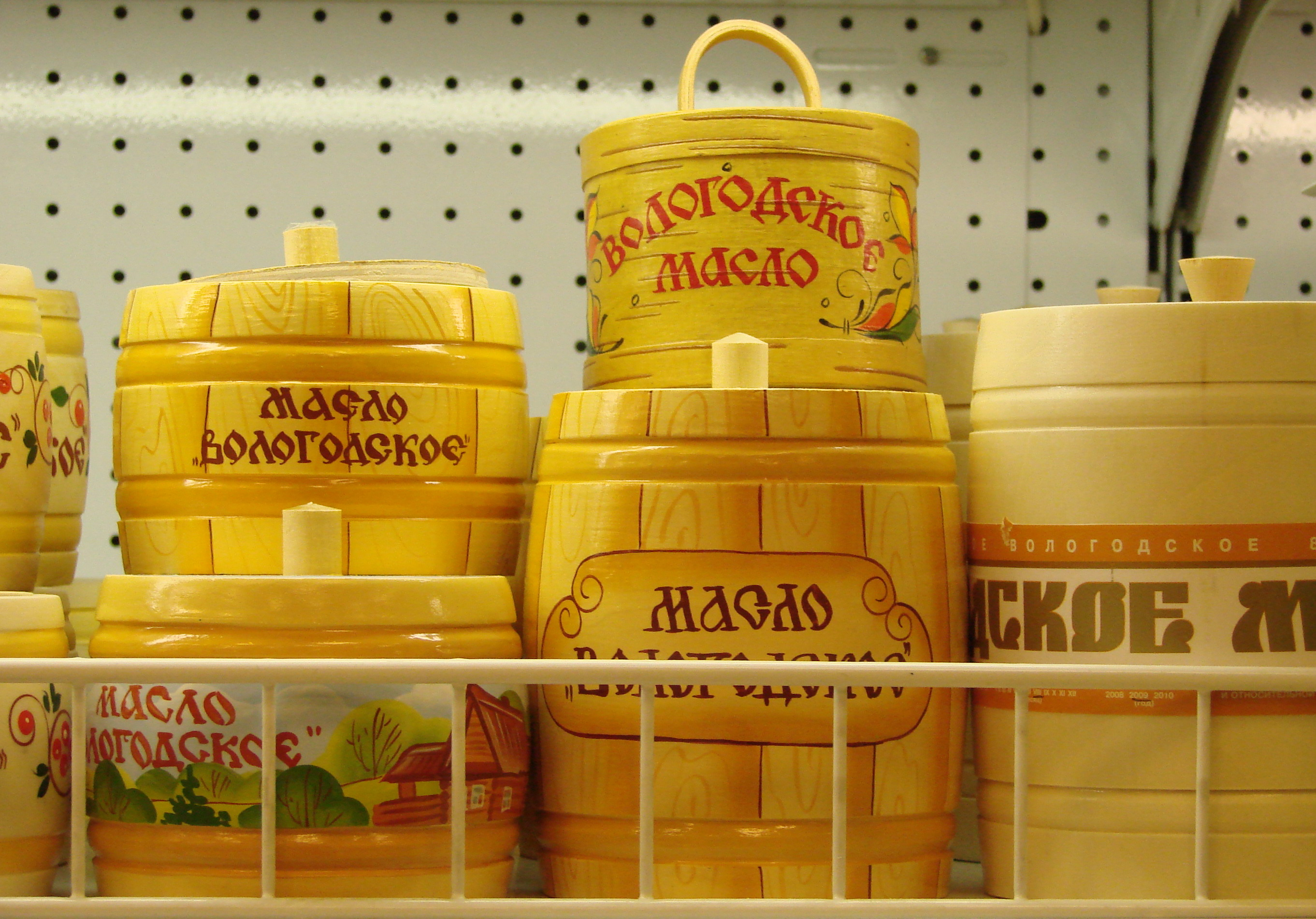
Vologda butter

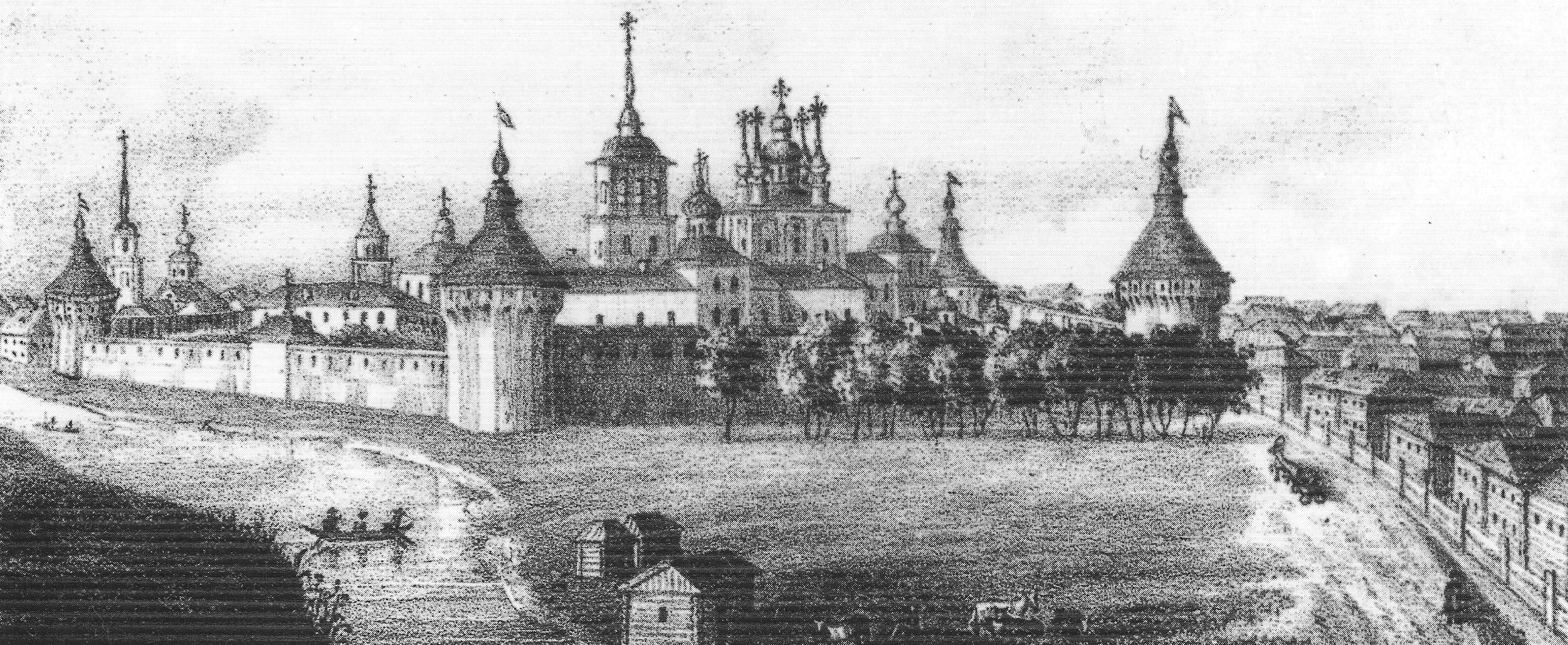
The Spaso-Prilutsky Monastery in the early 19th century

After 1613, Vologda quickly recovered due to its convenient location and once again became an important center of foreign trade. During the reign of Peter the Great, Vologda became one of the main military bases of Russia. Military and technical equipment for fortresses and military ships under construction was stored there. Vessels which delivered food supplies to Arkhangelsk were constructed in Vologda. Peter intended to hold them on Lake Kubenskoye, 30 kilometers (19 mi) north of Vologda. However, after personally inspecting the lake in 1692, he abandoned the idea deciding that the lake is improper for that purpose.

Peter the Great visited Vologda on no less than ten occasions, on six of which (in 1692, 1693, 1694, 1702, 1722, and 1724) he stayed in the city for extended time. He always stayed in a small house of the Dutch merchant Goutman, which in 1872 was bought by the city authorities, and in 1885 was transformed into the memorial museum of Peter the Great and became the first museum of Vologda.

However, after St. Petersburg was founded and foreign trade was rerouted to the Baltic Sea, the importance of Vologda as a center of foreign trade decayed. In 1722, Peter issued the decree restricting trade through Arkhangelsk, which damaged Vologda even further. In the course of the administrative reform carried out in 1708, Vologda lost its functions as an administrative center and was included as a town of Archangelgorod Governorate.

The revival began only during the reign of Catherine the Great who in 1780 made Vologda the center of Vologda Viceroyalty, a successor of Archangelgorod Governorate. In 1796, the viceroyalty, administered by a governor-general, was transformed into Vologda Governorate, the borders of which stretched up to the Ural mountains in the east. The center of Vologda was rebuilt according to the plan of a provincial city issued in 1781. The street network is still in use now.

A new economic lifting of the city was connected with a steamship movement across the Sukhona and with the building of a new railroad line connecting Vologda with Yaroslavl and Moscow (1872), with Arkhangelsk (1898), with St. Petersburg and Vyatka (1905).

In 1871, the Danish merchant Friedrich Buman opened a specialized butter factory in the manor of Fominskoye, 13 kilometers (8.1 mi) from Vologda. It was the first butter factory both in Vologda Governorate and in Russia. Since then Vologda became the center of the butter industry, and the Vologda butter, a special type of butter with the taste of nuts invented by Nikolay Vereschagin and Buman, became a world trademark. In 1911, the manor of Fominskoye together with the Buman's creamery was given to the state and became the base for the Vologda dairy institute. Thereby Vologda turned to one of the largest dairy centers of Russia.

Since the 15th century, Vologda was a political exile destination and was even known as "Siberia close to the capital". In the 19th–20th centuries, such persons as Joseph Stalin, Vyacheslav Molotov (later the Minister of Foreign Affairs), Nikolai Berdyaev (the famous Russian philosopher), Boris Savinkov (later known as a successful terrorist), Mariya Ulyanova, and Alexander Bogdanov were sent to Vologda. Anatoly Lunacharsky chose to go there to join Bogdanov, and to marry Anna Alexandrovna Malinovskaya, Bogdanov's sister.

=== Soviet period ===
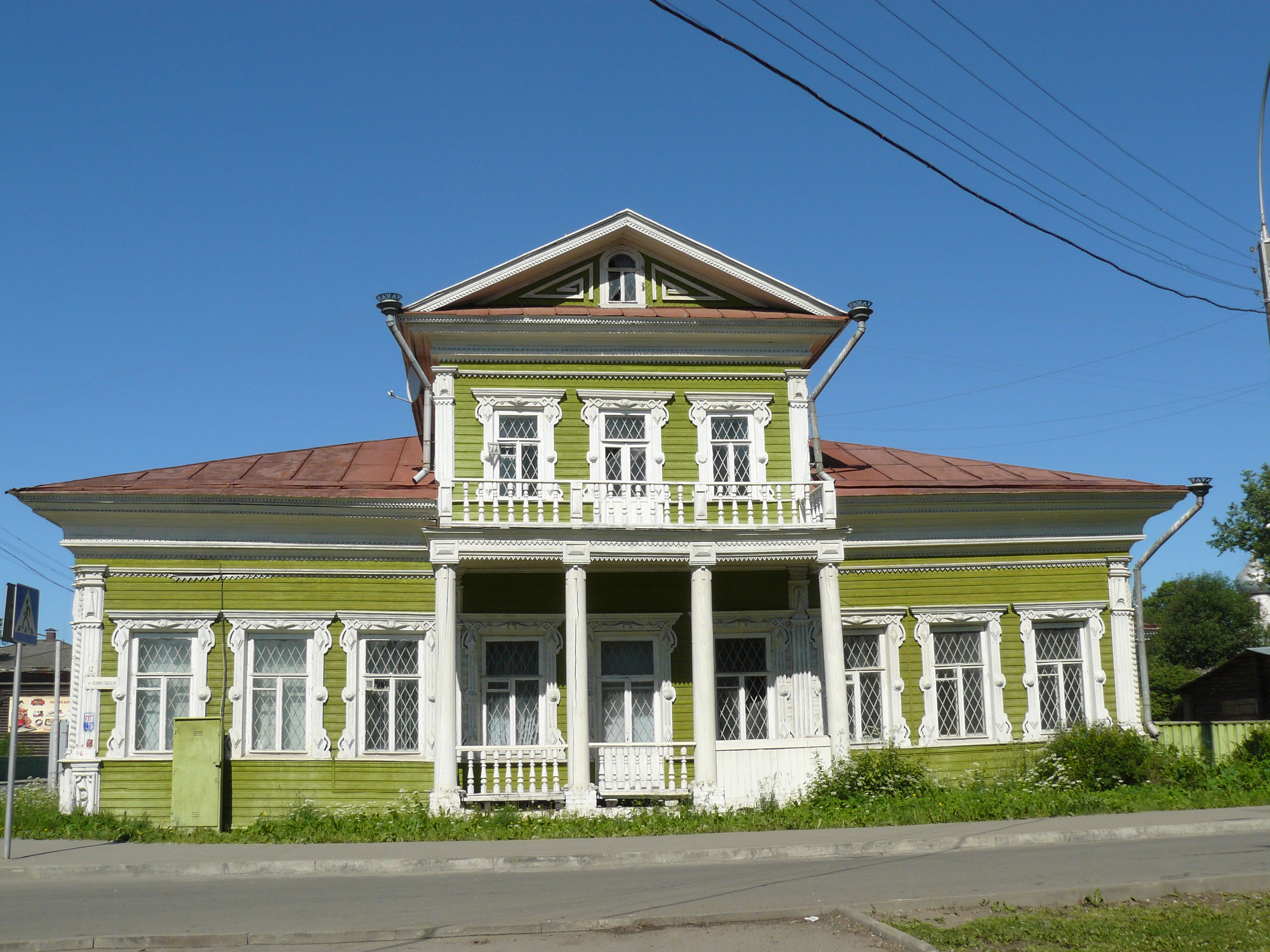
Traditional wooden architecture

V. I. Lenin Monument

V. I. Lenin. Monument. Historical district City, Vologda, Russia Soviet power was established in Vologda in December 1917, and up to the summer of 1918 co-existed with the zemstvo and municipal administration. In February 1918, Vologda became the "diplomatic capital of Russia" for several months. Embassies located in Saint Petersburg were threatened by the German army, so Western powers, led by American Ambassador David R. Francis, relocated them to Vologda. However, pressured by the Bolsheviks, on July 24, 1918, the diplomats were compelled to leave Vologda and repatriate via Arkhangelsk.

During the Russian Civil War, Vologda was the location of the headquarters of the 6th Red Army. The army opposed the White Army under command of Evgeny Miller and the military forces of Entente in northern Russia.

In 1924 the government ordered to close the Vsegradsky cathedral, that used to be one of the biggest and most revered in the city. In 1929, the Vologda Governorate was abolished and included into the structure of a new formation, Northern Krai, which also included former Arkhangelsk and Northern Dvina Governorates, as well as the Komi-Zyryan Autonomous Oblast. The administrative center of Northern Krai was located in Arkhangelsk. In December 1936, Northern Krai was abolished and divided into the Komi ASSR and Northern Oblast, with the administrative center still located in Arkhangelsk. On September 23, 1937, Northern Oblast was divided into Arkhangelsk Oblast and Vologda Oblast by the decision of the Central Executive Committee of the Soviet Union. According to the same decision, districts of former Cherepovets Okrug of Leningrad Oblast were attached to Vologda Oblast. These districts currently make for the western part of Vologda Oblast. Thereby the current borders of Vologda Oblast were determined.

In the 1930s, a flax factory, a coach-repair factory, and a sawmill, "Northern Communard," were constructed.

During World War II, martial law was declared in Vologda, and its industrial enterprises shifted to military production. In the fall of 1941, Finnish troops crossed the borders of Vologda Oblast, and Vologda thus became a front city. The inhabitants were mobilized to dig trenches. In the city, bomb-proof shelters and elementary shelters were under construction, systems of air defense which protected the railway junction and the military-industrial enterprises were developed. As a result, though attempts of bombardments were numerous, no bombs fell on the city. To commemorate these events, a monument to the air defense forces was later erected on Zosimovskaya Street in Vologda. The monument has the shape of an anti-aircraft gun. In addition, Vologda was a railway hub used to supply the army and to evacuate equipment. It also served as a large hospital center. Residents of Vologda donated blood, money, and jewellery. The tank detachment "Vologda Collective Farmer" was funded by these donations. To commemorate these events the monument to the tank T-34 was built on Mira Street.

Between 1961 and 1985, Anatoly Drygin was the first secretary of the CPSU Vologda Oblast Committee and the head of the oblast. During this period, notable changes in many aspects of economy both of the city and of the oblast occurred. In particular, a bearing plant, a mechanical plant, and an optical-mechanical factory were built in Vologda. A polytechnical university was opened. A large-scale poultry farm was established. A major construction initiative was carried out, and, in particular, the first buildings higher than five floors were constructed. The city expanded, with new residential areas built; in particular, Byvalovo, GPZ, the fifth and the sixth Microdistricts. In 1976, the Vologda trolleybus system opened.

=== Post-Soviet period ===
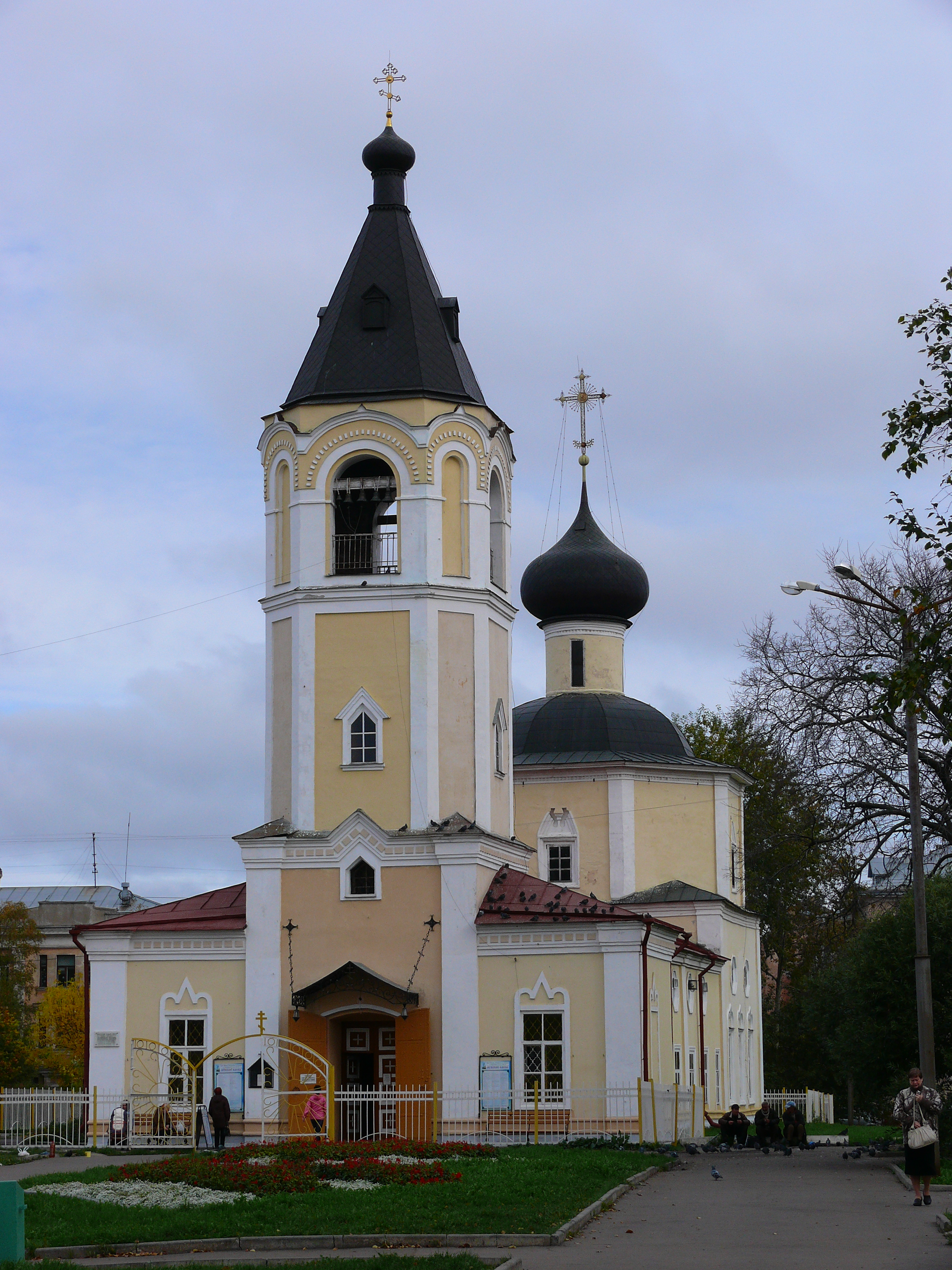
Church of Intercession in Kozlyona

In November 1991, the city administration was formed and the reform of local governments began. In October 1993, the Soviets of People's Deputies of all levels were abolished. After the dissolution of the Vologda Soviet, the City Duma was established. The first Duma elections took place on March 20, 1994. This first Duma only had six seats, but in 1995, after the next elections, it was expanded to thirty deputies.

On July 25, 1996, the City Duma adopted the main city document: the Charter of Vologda. On October 6, 1996, the first mayoral elections in the history of Vologda took place. Alexey Yakunichev was elected and became the head of the city. His term ended in 2008.

In 2003, the construction of a ring road started. Before that, the М8 highway connecting Moscow and Arkhangelsk ran through the city center, causing congestion. Since the completion, the ring road connects the highways А114 (Vologda – Novaya Ladoga), Р5 (Vologda – Medvezhyegorsk), and М8 (Moscow – Arkhangelsk). On August 25, 2005, the City Duma approved the new Charter of Vologda. Even though the deputies introduced more than four hundred amendments and the document increased more than twice in volume as compared with the Charter of 1996, the changes were relatively minor. On October 12, 2008, Yevgeny Shulepov was elected to be the City Head.

== Geography ==
=== Climate ===
Vologda's climate is a warm-summer humid continental climate (Dfb) under the Köppen classification and temperate continental with mildly warm summer and cold winter (Dclo) under the Trewartha classification. Winter is long and cold but not severe and lasts for five months. Spring and autumn are cool, summer is mild, the coldest months are January and February, the warmest month is July. Rain is most frequent in the summer and autumn.

- Mean annual temperature: +3.1 °C (37.6 °F)
- Mean annual speed of wind: 3.0 m/s
- Mean annual humidity of air: 80%

Climate data for Vologda (1991–2020, extremes 1844–present)
Month	Jan	Feb	Mar	Apr	May	Jun	Jul	Aug	Sep	Oct	Nov	Dec	Year
Record high °C (°F)	5.3 (41.5)	5.6 (42.1)	16.4 (61.5)	26.8 (80.2)	31.1 (88.0)	34.9 (94.8)	34.5 (94.1)	36.4 (97.5)	28.8 (83.8)	22.8 (73.0)	13.5 (56.3)	8.5 (47.3)	36.4 (97.5)
Mean daily maximum °C (°F)	−6.7 (19.9)	−5.4 (22.3)	0.6 (33.1)	9.2 (48.6)	17.2 (63.0)	21.2 (70.2)	23.6 (74.5)	20.8 (69.4)	14.6 (58.3)	6.6 (43.9)	−0.8 (30.6)	−4.6 (23.7)	8.0 (46.4)
Daily mean °C (°F)	−11.2 (11.8)	−10.3 (13.5)	−3.8 (25.2)	3.4 (38.1)	10.9 (51.6)	15.5 (59.9)	16.5 (61.7)	16.2 (61.2)	10.1 (50.2)	0.3 (32.5)	−4.9 (23.2)	−9.7 (14.5)	3.5 (38.3)
Mean daily minimum °C (°F)	−13.3 (8.1)	−12.9 (8.8)	−8.2 (17.2)	−1.0 (30.2)	5.1 (41.2)	9.5 (49.1)	12.1 (53.8)	10.1 (50.2)	6.0 (42.8)	1.0 (33.8)	−5.3 (22.5)	−10.2 (13.6)	−0.6 (30.9)
Record low °C (°F)	−47.1 (−52.8)	−43.2 (−45.8)	−34.9 (−30.8)	−25.6 (−14.1)	−9.1 (15.6)	−3.1 (26.4)	1.2 (34.2)	−1.4 (29.5)	−8.6 (16.5)	−20.0 (−4.0)	−34.1 (−29.4)	−45.2 (−49.4)	−47.1 (−52.8)
Average precipitation mm (inches)	36 (1.4)	29 (1.1)	27 (1.1)	29 (1.1)	48 (1.9)	63 (2.5)	74 (2.9)	71 (2.8)	55 (2.2)	54 (2.1)	46 (1.8)	38 (1.5)	570 (22.4)
Average extreme snow depth cm (inches)	28 (11)	38 (15)	36 (14)	5 (2.0)	0 (0)	0 (0)	0 (0)	0 (0)	0 (0)	1 (0.4)	6 (2.4)	18 (7.1)	38 (15)
Average rainy days	6	5	8	14	17	18	16	18	19	18	12	7	158
Average snowy days	28	25	19	9	3	0.2	0	0.03	1	10	22	28	145
Average relative humidity (%)	86	83	78	71	65	73	76	81	84	87	88	87	80
Mean monthly sunshine hours	29.1	63.3	133.3	192.9	266.3	282.2	284.0	215.3	126.1	60.6	26.7	14.2	1,694
Source 1: Pogoda.ru.net
Source 2: NOAA

== Demographics ==
Historical population
Year	Pop.	±%
1897	27,705	—
1926	57,076	+106.0%
1939	95,314	+67.0%
1959	139,137	+46.0%
1970	177,751	+27.8%
1979	236,537	+33.1%
1989	282,802	+19.6%
2002	293,046	+3.6%
2010	301,755	+3.0%
2021	313,944	+4.0%
Source: Census data

The population of the city and the oblast consists mainly of ethnic Russians. A considerable part of the city population are government officials and civil servants of different levels – according to various estimates, their number reaches fifty thousand people. The reason is that Vologda is not only a big city but also the administrative center of Vologda Oblast. Around 43 million hectares of farmland is unused, hence government has announced giving away free land. Vologda will lend 468,000 hectares of land for agriculture and raising livestock purpose.

== Politics ==
The key subjects of power in the city are:

- The Vologda City Duma is a representative body. It comprises 30 deputies elected based on universal, equal, and direct suffrage in 30 single-mandate constituencies. The term of office of the City Council is five years. The Vologda City Duma is controlled and accountable to all elected officials (including the head of the city of Vologda), the city administration, and the Chamber of Control and Accounts. The activities of the city duma are managed by its chairman and presidium (consisting of the chairman, deputy chairmen, heads of factions and standing committees, and a representative of the head of the city of Vologda). The only faction in the Vologda City Duma is the United Russia faction (26 people).
- The Mayor of Vologda is the highest official in the city, authorized to manage the city economy, budget, distribution of funds, and management of the city administration. On 24 November 2017, Sergei Voropanov (United Russia) was appointed acting mayor of Vologda, being the first deputy head of the city. On 26 November 2019, he was appointed to the post of mayor.
- The head of the city of Vologda is a city official authorized for external municipal relations, accountable to the federal authorities. Appointed by deputies of the city duma and the governor for five years. Reports to the Vologda City Duma at least once a year. Since 26 September 2016, Yuri Sapozhnikov has been appointed mayor of Vologda.
- The Vologda city administration is an executive and administrative body. It consists of 7 departments (directly carry out management), 5 departments and 2 departments (provide the work of the administration). The head of administration is the head of the city of Vologda. Deputy heads of the city are heads of departments.
- The Chamber of Control and Accounts of the city of Vologda is a control body. It is formed by the Vologda City Duma and reports to it. Controls the execution of the budget and the disposal of property owned by the city, conducts budgetary examinations of municipal legal acts, and audits the effectiveness of the use of budgetary funds.

=== Administrative and municipal status ===
Vologda is the administrative center of the oblast and, within the framework of administrative divisions, it also serves as the administrative center of Vologodsky District, even though it is not a part of it. As an administrative division, it is, together with one rural locality, incorporated separately as the city of oblast significance of Vologda (one of the four in Vologda Oblast)—an administrative unit with the status equal to that of the districts. As a municipal division, the city of oblast significance of Vologda is incorporated as Vologda Urban Okrug.

== Culture and art ==
Vologda is one of the best preserved big cities of Russia combining traditional wooden architecture and stone monuments. In Vologda, 193 monuments of architecture and history are designated as cultural monuments of federal significance. The most known of them are

- Vologda Kremlin (Bishop's courtyard)
- Saint Sophia cathedral
- Spaso-Prilutsky Monastery
- ensemble of the Vladimir churches
- Konstantin and Elena church, St. John the Baptist Church in Roshcheniye with its frescoes
- Dmitry Prilutsky church
- Church of the Intercession on Kozlyona
- architectural ensembles of the Stone bridge and of the Revolyutsii Square

Of 116 historical cities of Russia only 16 have monuments of wooden architecture. Vologda is among them.

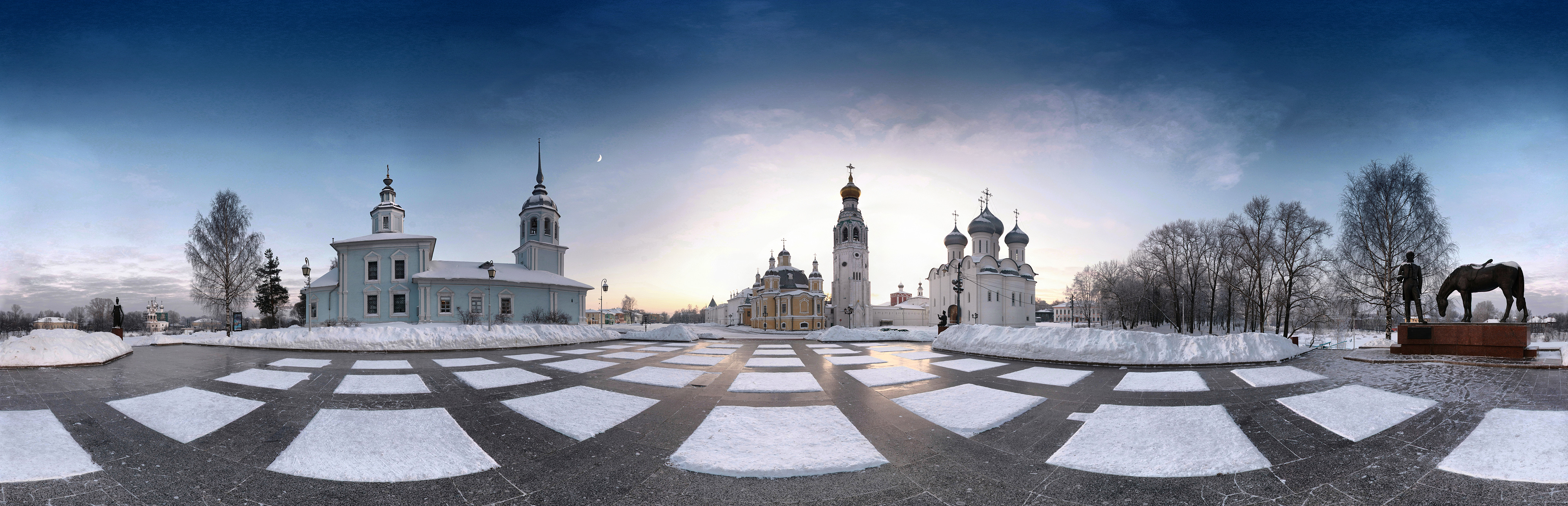
Panorama of the Vologda Kremlin

=== Trademarks ===
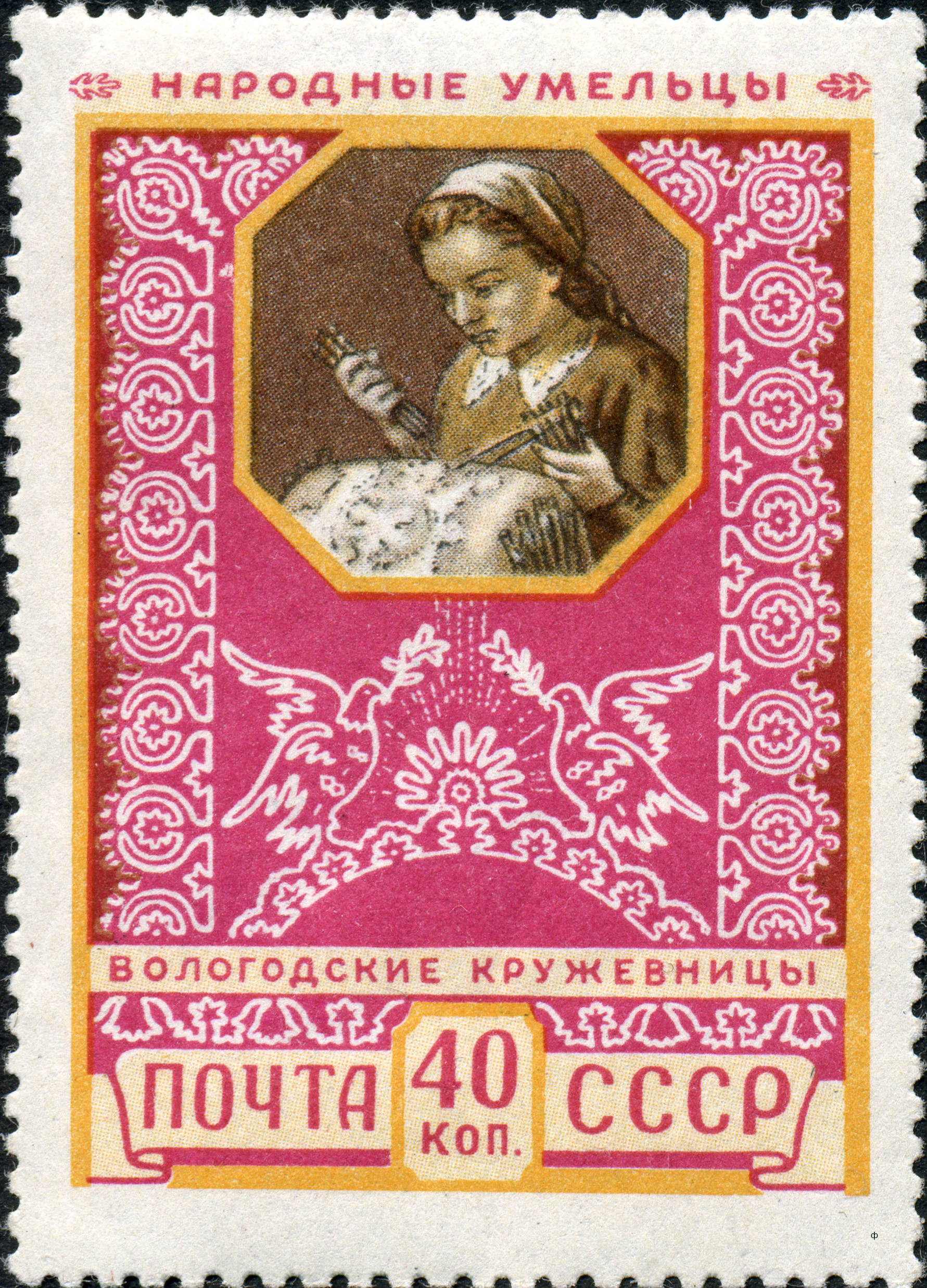
1957 stamp illustrating Vologda lace.

Vologda's trademark products include Vologda lace, butter, and flax.

=== Museums ===
In Vologda, there are ten museums, four showrooms of the Vologda Regional Art Gallery, and the gallery "Red bridge". The largest cultural center of the Russian North is the Vologda State Museum Reserve. Its structure now includes the following museums,

- Vologda Kremlin (Bishop's courtyard)
- Peter the Great's house museum (Peter's house) – the first museum of Vologda (opened in 1885)
- Expocenter "Vologda at a boundary of centuries"
- Museum "World of the forgotten things"
- K. N. Batyushkov's apartment museum
- Museum "Literature. Art. 20th century"
- Alexander Mozhaysky's house museum
- Museum "Vologda exile"
- Museum of Architecture and Ethnography (Semyonkovo)

Additionally, Vologda is home to a unique Russian private museum of political history—the Museum of Diplomatic Corps which highlights the short stay of diplomatic corps in Vologda in 1918.

=== Theaters ===
- Drama theater
- Theater for children and youth
- Puppet theater "Teremok"
- Chamber theater
- Philharmonic society of Valery Gavrilin
- Children's musical theater

=== Annual festivals ===
The following annual theater festivals are held in Vologda:

- "Voices of History" (the beginning of July, every year)
- Valery Gavrilin international music festival (every year, from October until December)
- "Summer in the Kremlin" (every even year, from June until July)
- The annual open international festival of multimedia art "Multimatograf"

=== Exhibitions ===
Among annual exhibitions which take place in Vologda are the following:

- "Russian Flax"
- "Russian Wood"
- "Gates of the North"
- "Your Home"

=== Literature ===
Many notable Russian writers and poets were born or worked in Vologda. The best known of them were Konstantin Batyushkov, Varlam Shalamov, Nikolay Rubtsov, and Vasily Belov and Vladimir Gilarovsky. Contemporary literature of Vologda is represented by a number of authors which include Nata Suchkova, Maria Markova, Galina Schekina, and Anton Chorny.

== Institutions of higher education ==
- Vologda State Technical University
- Vologda State Pedagogical University
- N.V. Vereschagin Vologda State Dairy Academy
- Vologda Institute of Law and Economy of the Federal Penal Service
- Vologda Institute of Business
- Branches:
  - Vologda branch of the Moscow State Law Academy
  - Vologda branch of the Northwestern Academy of Public Service
  - Vologda branch of the Saint Petersburg State University of Engineering and Economics
  - Vologda branch of the International Academy of Business and New Technologies

== Transportation ==
Vologda is a major transportation hub, located at the intersection of highways, railways, and waterways.

The public transport network is well developed in the city: There are both bus and trolleybus lines. The city has four big automobile bridges: two automobile bridges across the Vologda and two bridges across railways. There is one pedestrian bridge (the Red bridge) in the city center.

=== Railway ===
Vologda is the largest sorting and transit spot of the Northern Railway. It includes the stations Vologda-1, Vologda-2, Rybkino, and Losta. The stretch between Vologda-2 and Losta is the most active one in the railroad network of the Russian Federation, with more than 120–150 pairs of trains running through it daily. Suburban trains and long-distance trains originate from the railway station of Vologda-1. The Rybkino railway station, a railway station for freight trains, is near Vologda.

=== Air ===
The Vologda Airport is situated 10 km from the city centre along the Arkhangelsk highway. Yak-40 aircraft carry out regular passenger flights to Moscow, Ukhta, Velikiy Ustyug, Kichmengsky Gorodok, and Vytegra. Helicopters Mi-2 and Mi-8 are used by the Vologda aviation company. They are used for the emergency aircraft and for the oil pipeline service.

=== Highways ===
The following highways go through Vologda:

- Federal highway М8 (Moscow–Yaroslavl–Vologda–Arkhangelsk–Severodvinsk). The entrance to Vologda from the Moscow side (south) is Okruzhnoe shosse and Koneva street, from the Arkhangelsk side (north) to Chernyshevskaya street.
- Road А-114 (Vologda–Cherepovets–Novaya Ladoga). The entrance to Vologda is Leningradskoe shosse and Okruzhnoe shosse.
- Line Р-5 (Vologda–Kirillov–Vytegra–Pudozh–Medvezhyegorsk). The entrance to Vologda is Alexander Klubov street.
- Roads of local importance lead to
  - Mozhaiskoye and Norobovo,
  - Fetinino (through Semyonkovo)
  - Gryazovets and Rostilovo (old Moscow highway).

The new ring road with modern exits connecting roads A-114, Р-5 and М-8 (the Arkhangelsk destination) is under construction around Vologda. The Arkhangelsk direction is still not connected by the ring road.

=== Urban public transport ===
The municipal transportation of Vologda is carried out by bus and trolleybus routes, and also by lines of fixed-route taxis. Regular bus service started in Vologda in 1929, the trolleybus service was open in 1976. As of November 2009, in Vologda there were five trolleybus routes, nineteen municipal bus routes, and about forty marshrutkas (routed taxis). The main transport companies are the open society "VologdaElectroTrans" (trolleybuses), PATP-1 and PATP-32 (municipal bus routes).

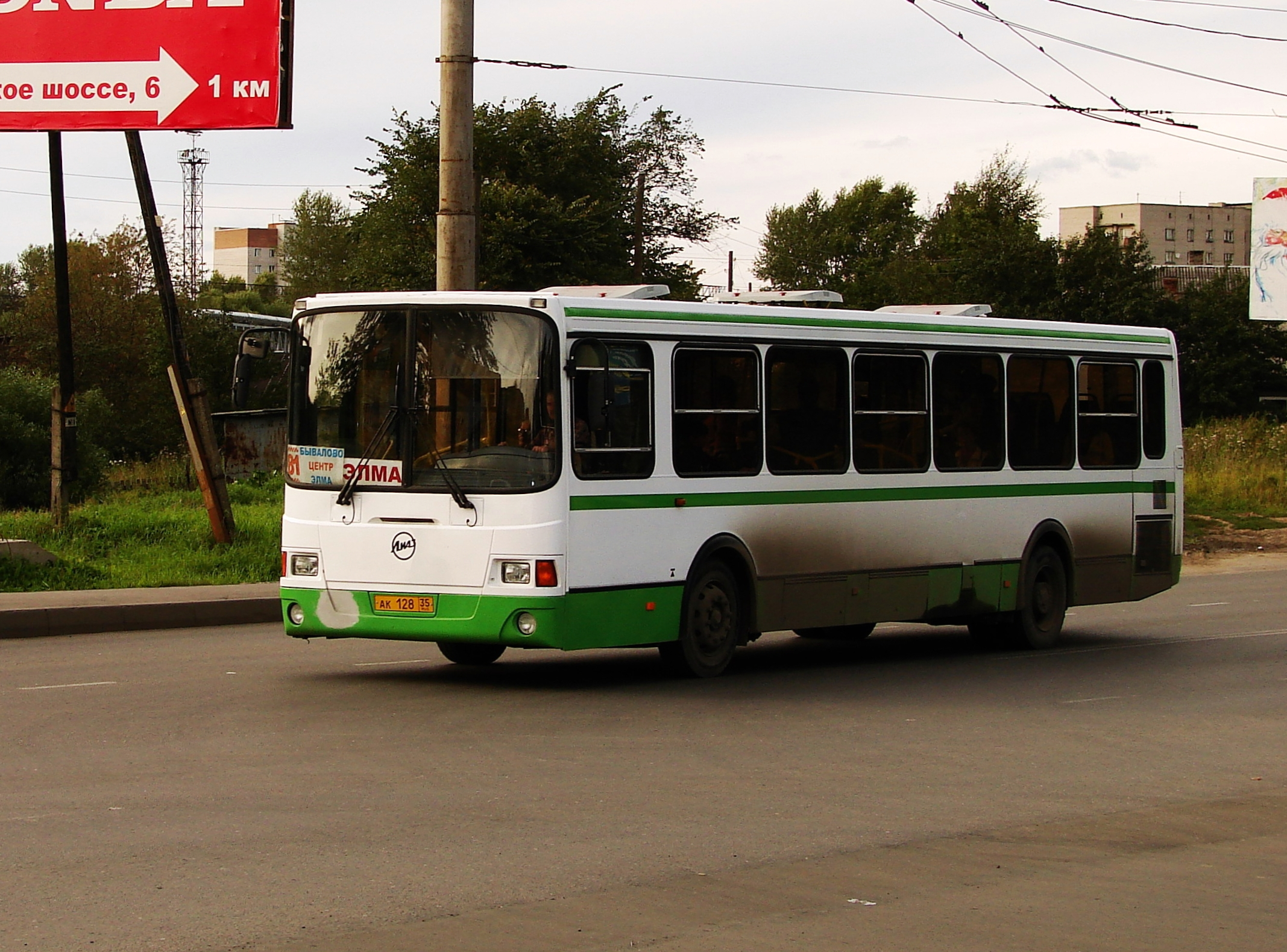
Bus LiAZ-5256

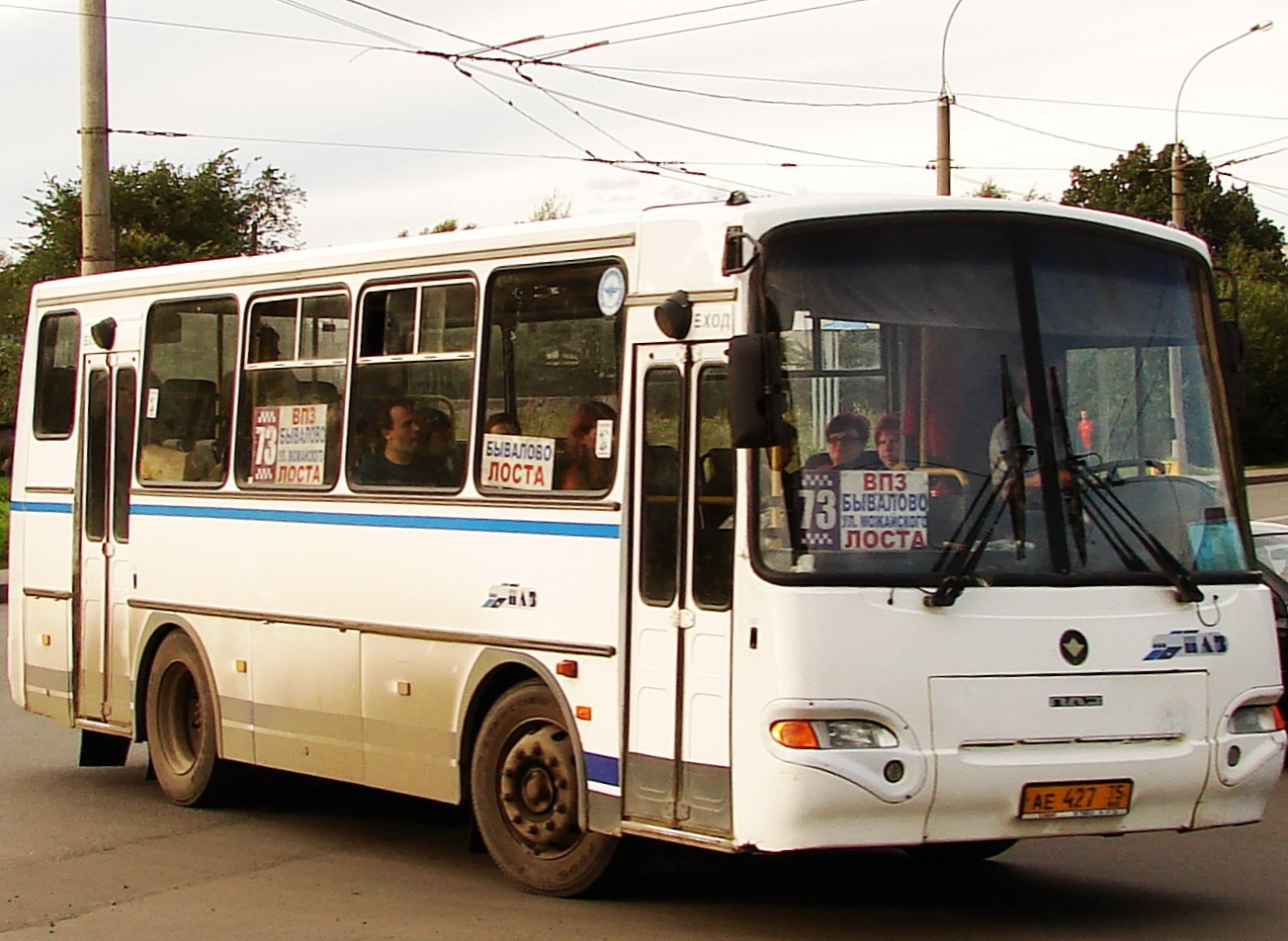
PAZ-4230 "Aurora"

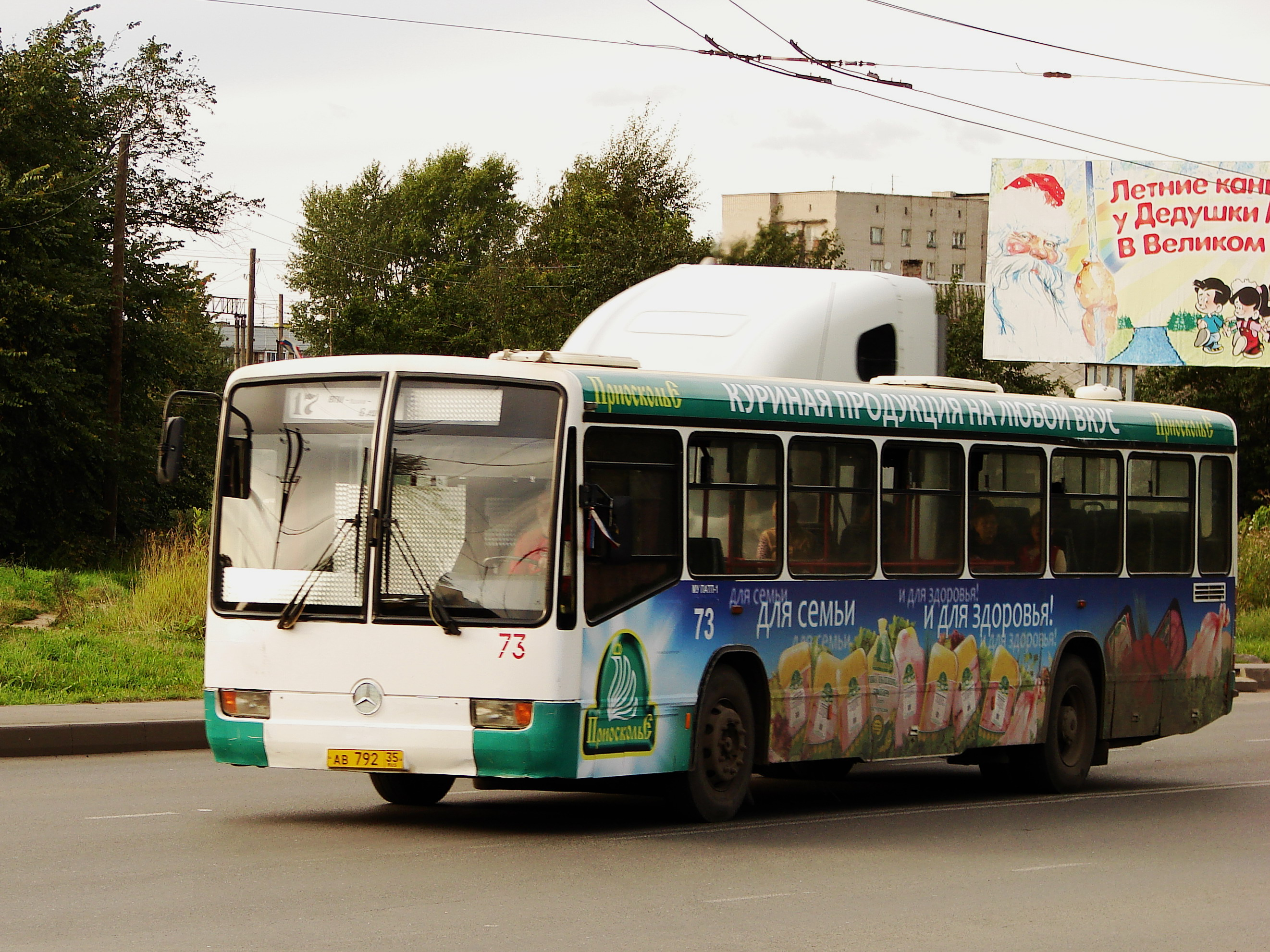
Mercedes-Benz O345

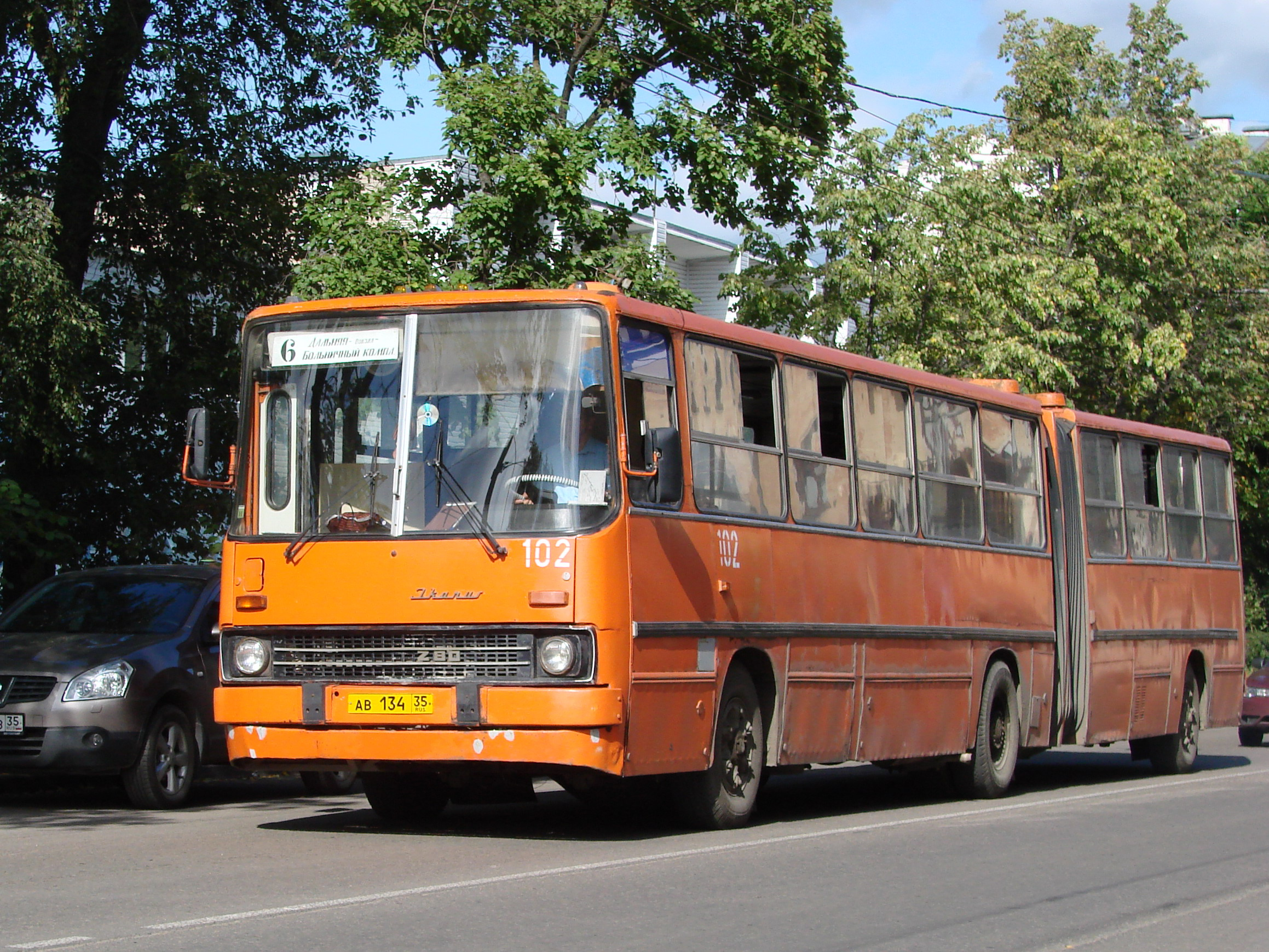
Ikarus 280

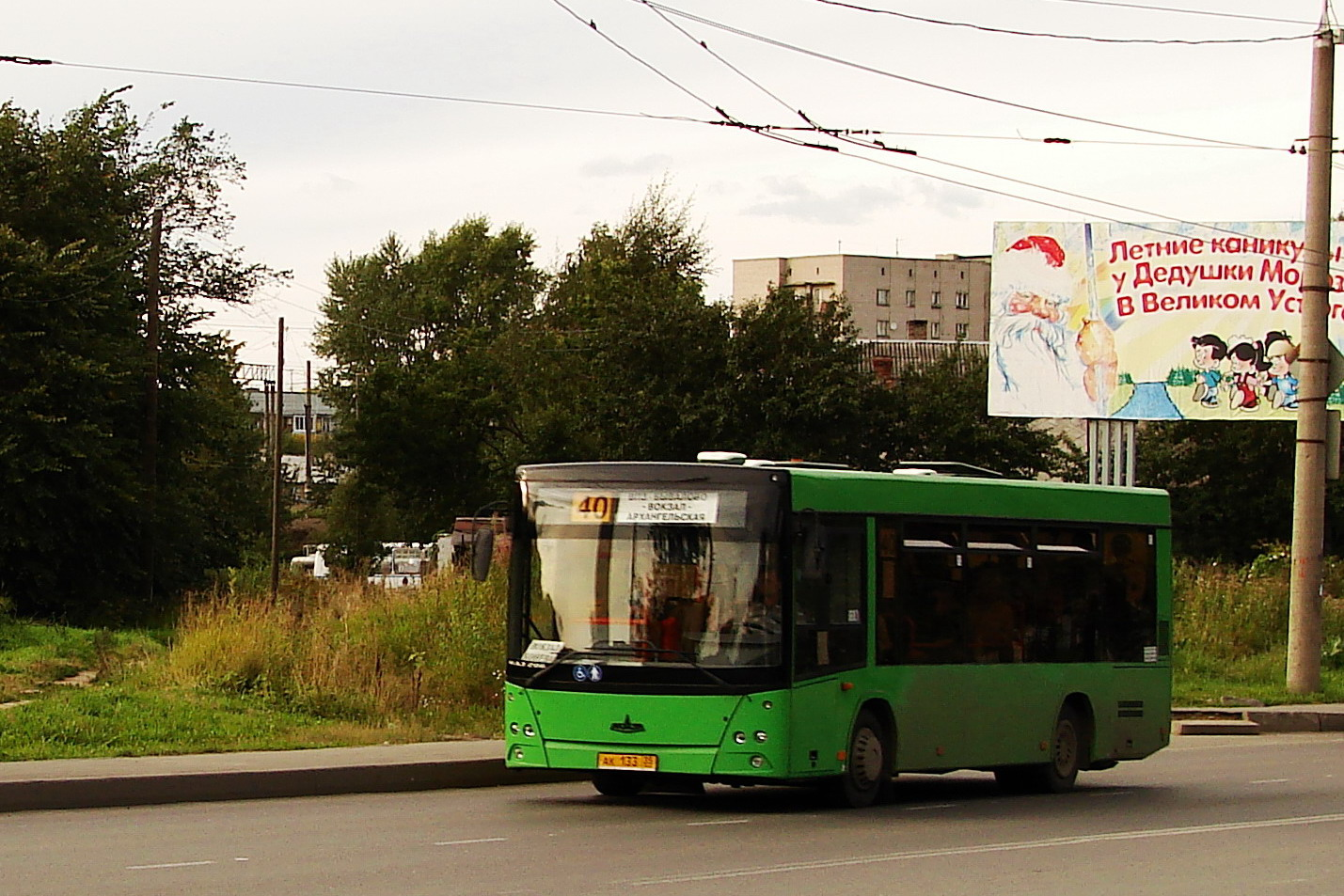
MAZ-206

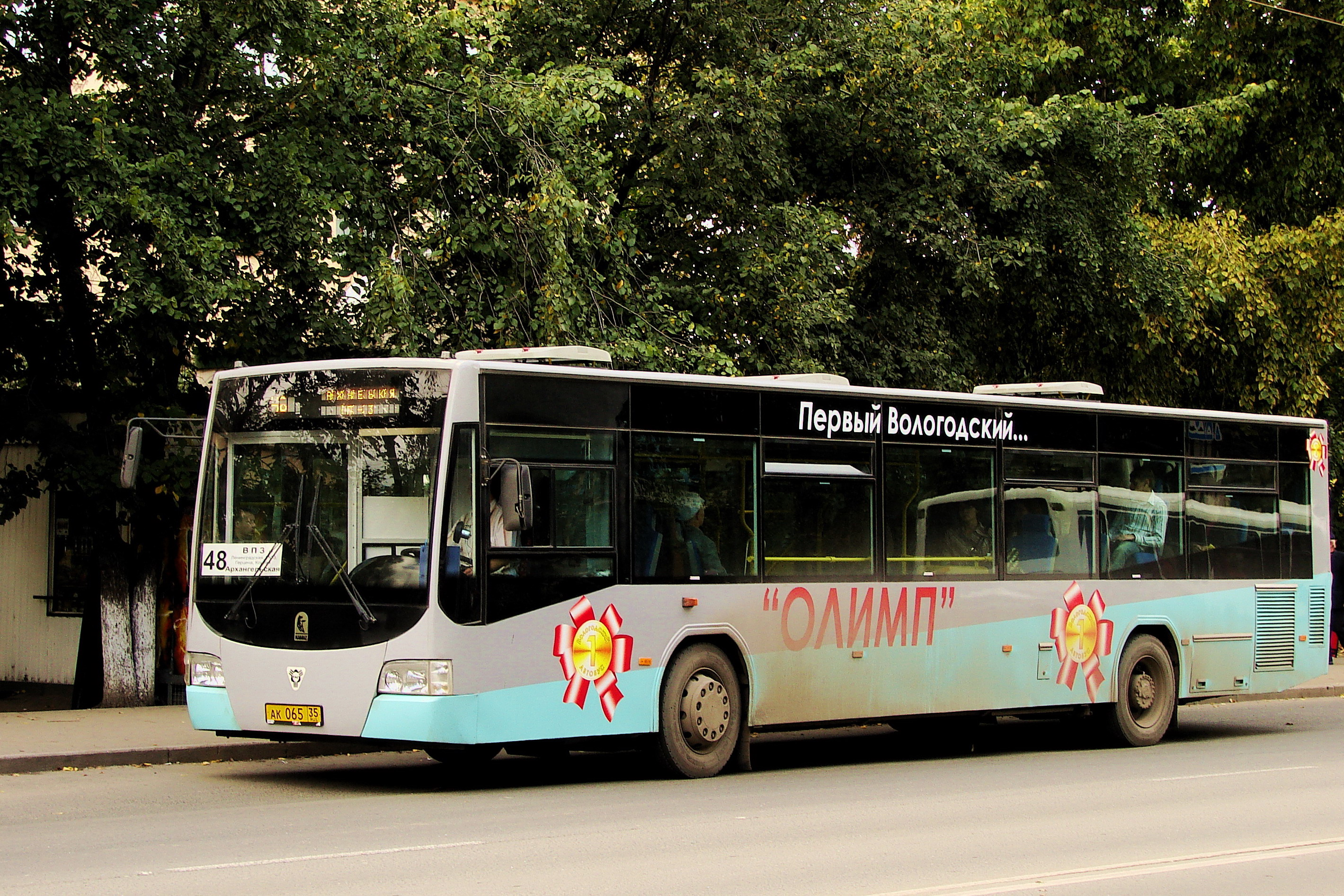
VMZ "Olimp"

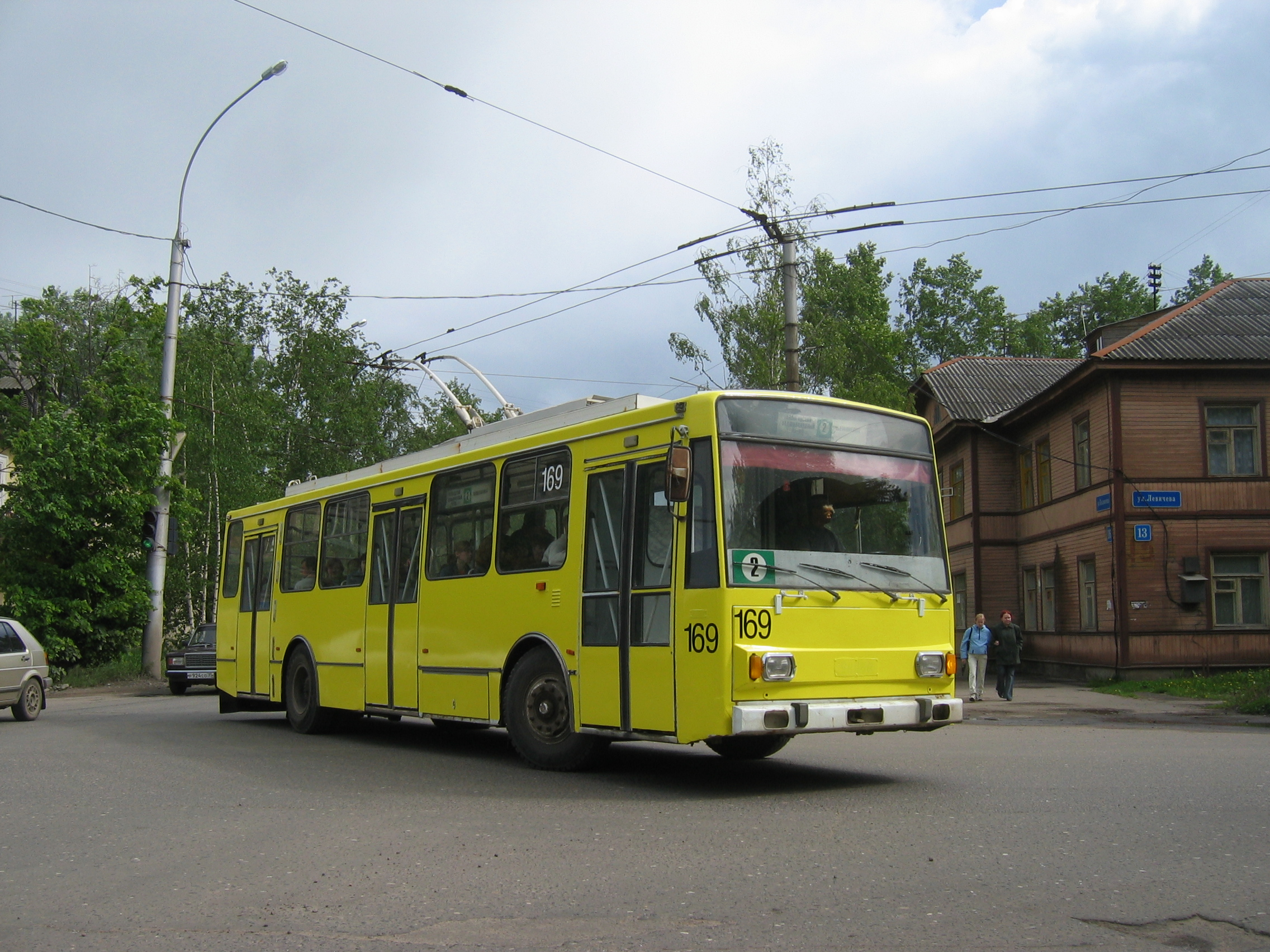
Trolleybus Skoda-VMZ-14Tr

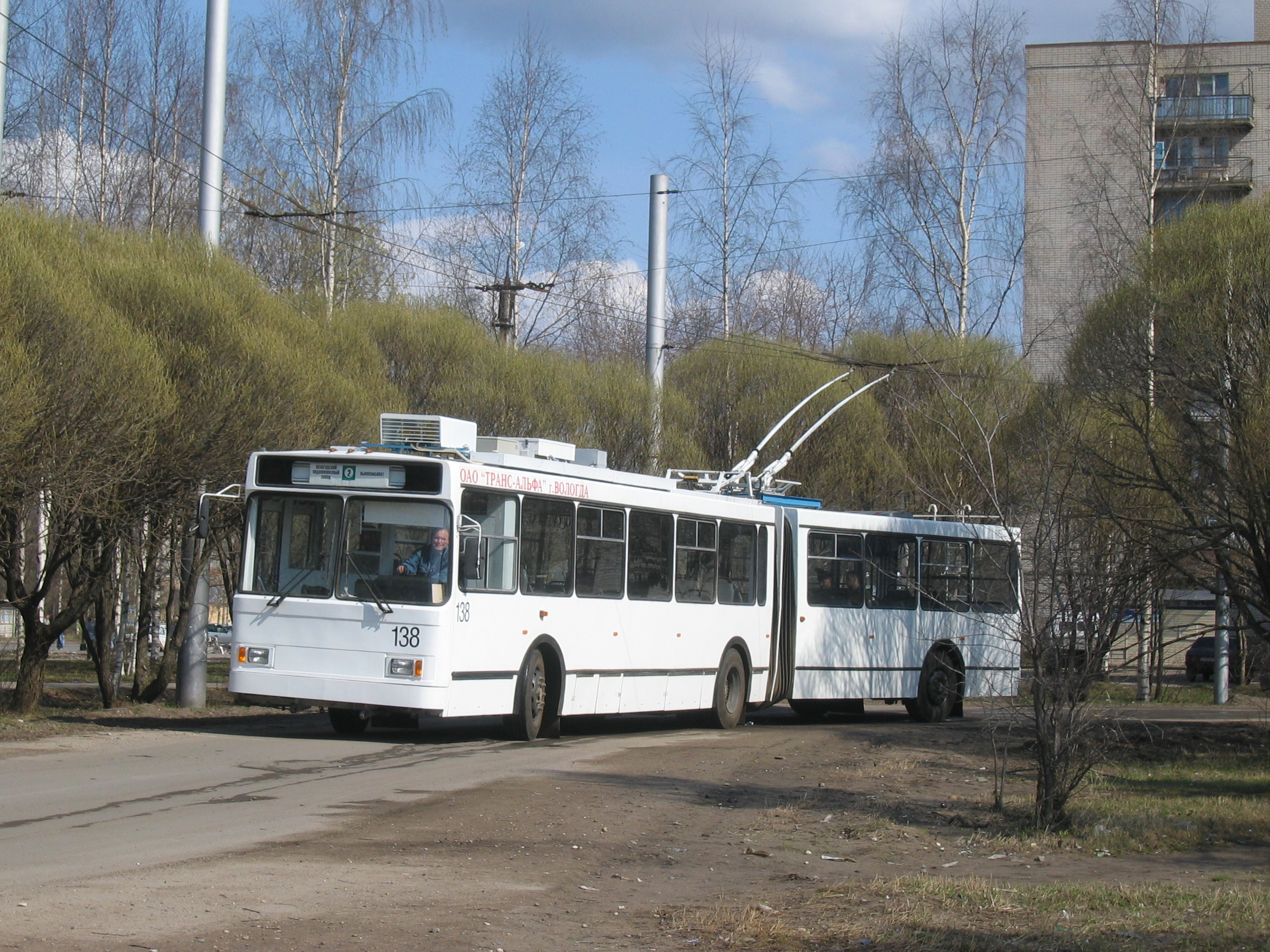
Trolleybus VMZ-6215

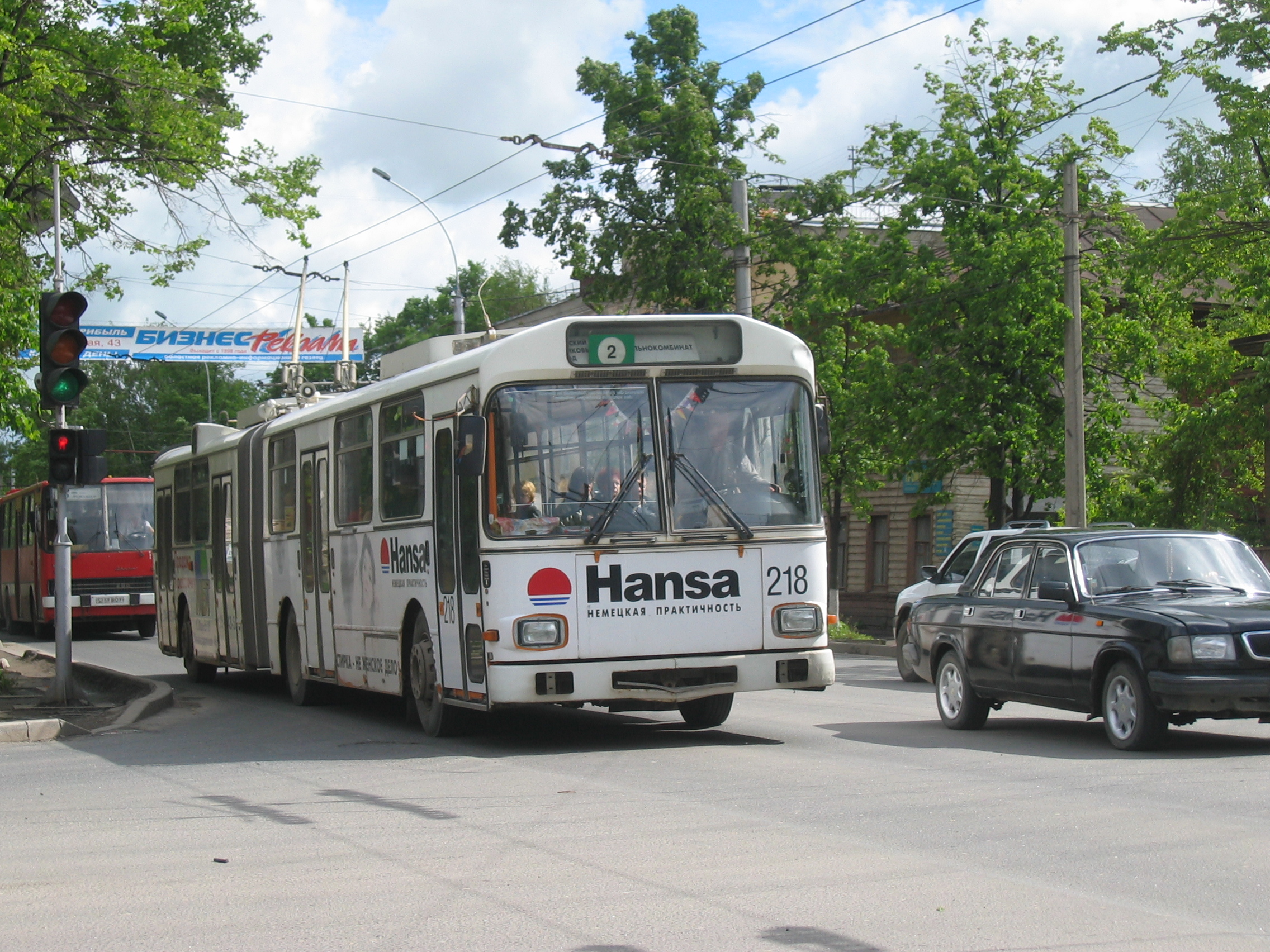
Trolleybus Gräf & Stift 150M18

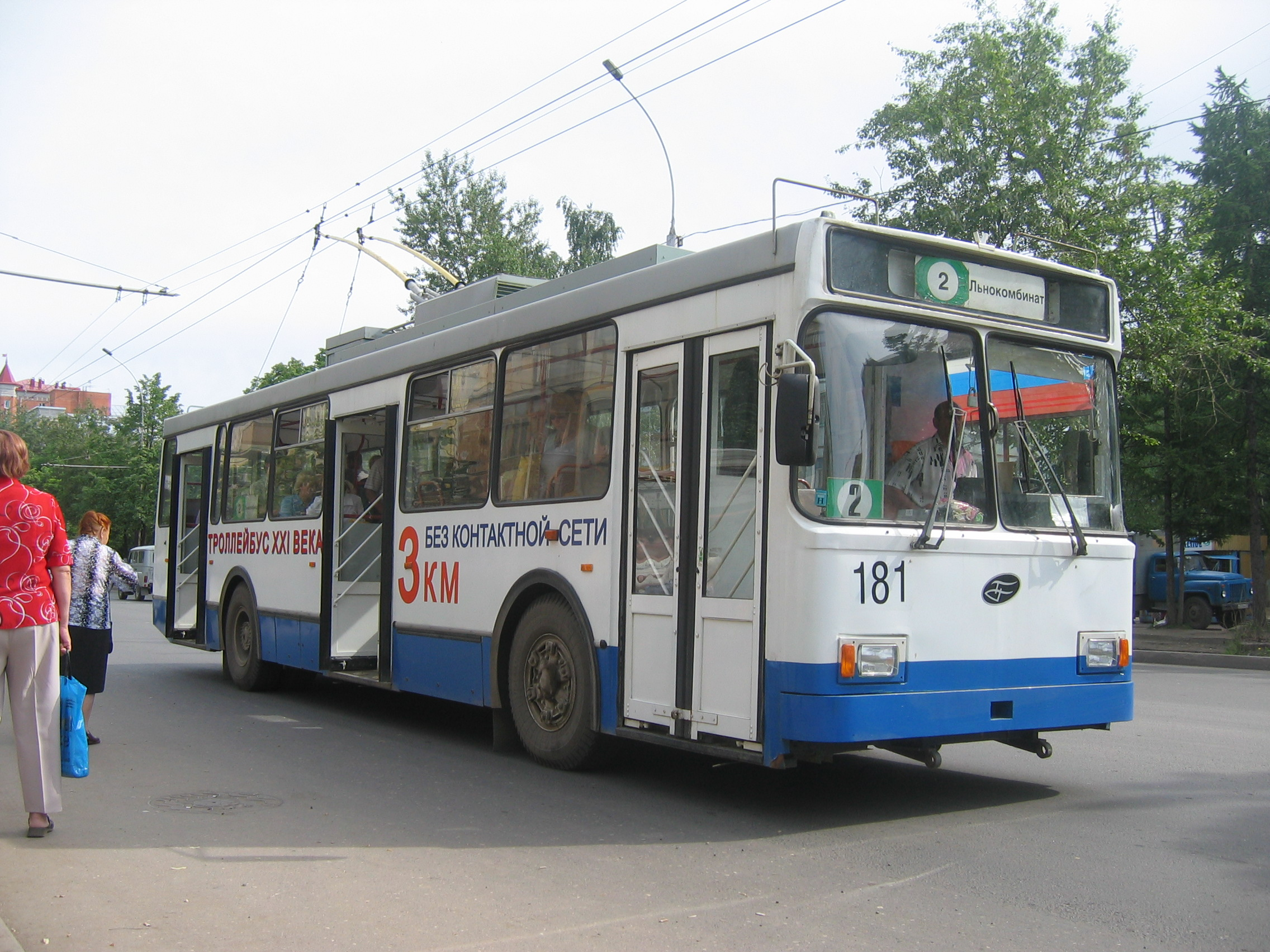
Trolleybus VMZ-5298

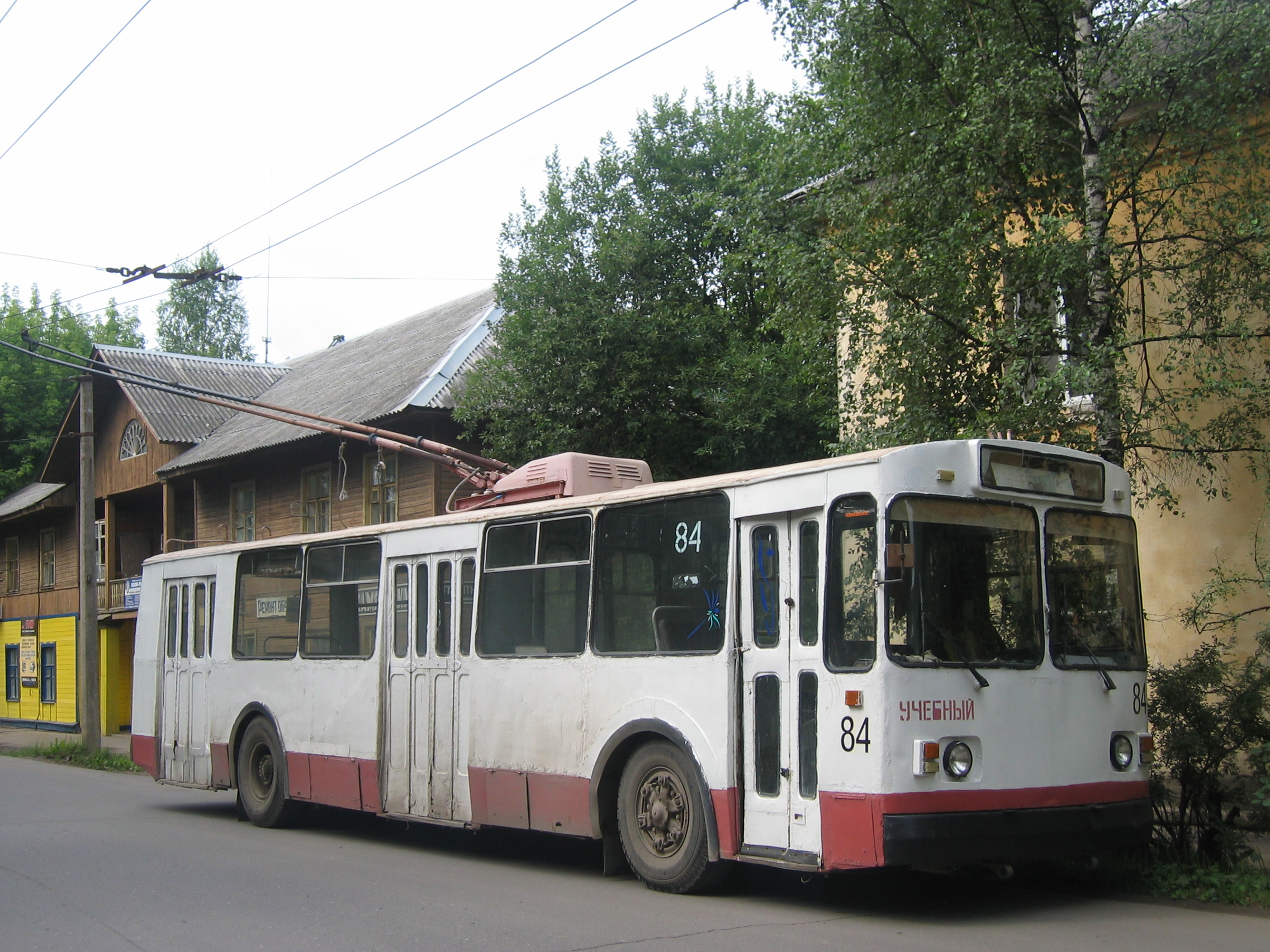
VMZ-375

== Industry ==
Currently, there are more than ten thousand enterprises of various patterns of ownership in Vologda. The most notable ones are:

- Closed joint-stock company "Vologda Bearing Factory" – produces bearings of various types
- Open joint stock company "Vagron" – alcohol production
- Open joint stock company "Vologda Machine-Building Plant" – produces various processing equipment for agriculture
- Open joint stock company "Vologda Optical and Mechanical Plant" – produces optical devices
- State-owned enterprise "Vologda Railway-Carriage Repair Works", branch of the Open Society of the Russian Railway – produces various trains, makes repair and reconstruction of old carriages
- Open joint stock company "Byvalovsky machinery plant" – the leading enterprise of the Northwest of Russia that produces cranes
- Open joint stock company "ElectroTechMash" – produces electric household and technological products
- Limited liability company "Central operating company" – building, designing, management of dwellings, management of the commercial real estate
- Open joint stock company "Trans-alpha" (former "Vologda mechanical factory") – produces trolleybuses and buses
- Opened joint-stock company "Vologda building designs and road machines factory" – produces mobile buildings for household, public, and industrial use
- Closed joint-stock company "SoyuzLesMontazh" – produces a wide range of equipment for wood processing and equipment for the paper industry

Traditional national crafts are presented by the closed joint-stock company «Snowflake» (lace), limited liability company "Hope" and other enterprises.

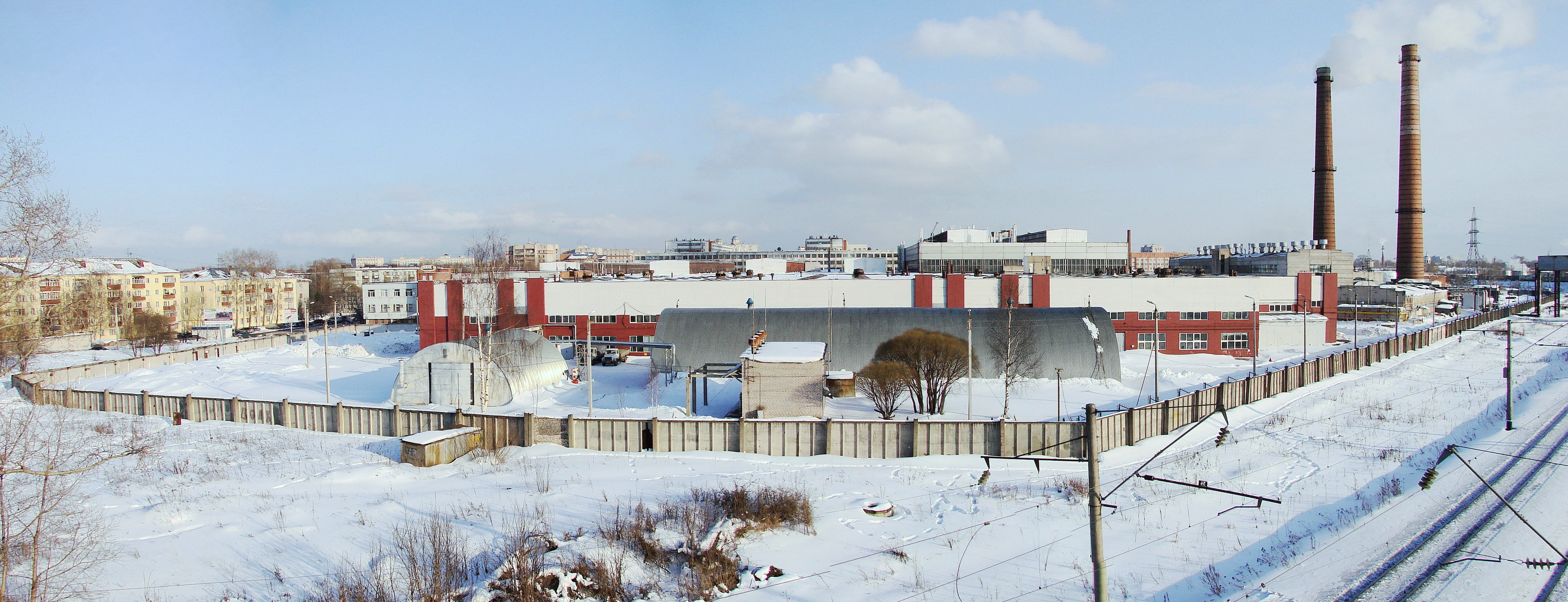
Vologda Optical and Mechanical Plant

== Sports ==
Vologda has large sports venues such as the stadiums "Dynamo", "Locomotive", "Vityaz", the swimming pools "Dynamo" and "Lagoon", the sports and concert complex "Spectrum", fitness centers, regional athletic spots. Vologda is a home to:

- the male soccer team "Dynamo"
- the female basketball team "Chevakata"

== Twin towns – sister cities ==
Vologda is twinned with:

- Burgas, Bulgaria
- Grodno, Belarus
- Kouvola, Finland
- Sevastopol, Ukraine
- Yevpatoria, Ukraine

== Notable people ==
=== Arts ===
- Konstantin Batyushkov (1787–1855), poet
- Valery Gavrilin (1939–1999), composer
- Varlam Shalamov (1907–1982), writer, poet
- Georgi Vasilyev (1899–1946), film director, screenwriter
- Apollo Korzeniowski and his son Joseph Conrad, writers, were expelled to Vologda via court-martial order
- Anya Monzikova (born 1984), model and actress

=== Sciences ===
- Alexander Bykov (born 1962), historian, numismatist
- Khariton Chebotaryov (1746–1815), historian, rector of the Moscow University
- Nikolay Devyatkov (1907–2001), engineer and inventor
- Grigory Landsberg (1890–1957), physicist

=== Sports ===
- Uno Aava (born 1928), Estonian racing driver
- Yuliya Chekalyova (born 1984), cross-country skier
- Zhanna Gromova (born 1949), figure skating coach
- Nikolay Gulyayev (born 1966), speed skater
- Aleksandr Vladimirovich Kulikov (born 1988), football player
- Natalia Podolskaya (canoeist) (born 1993), canoeist
- Artur Rylov (born 1989), football player
- Tamara Rylova (1931–2021), speed skater
- Adam Vishnyakov (born 1991), former professional football player
- Artem Yashkin (born 1975), football player

== See also ==
- Northern Thebaid

== General and cited references ==
- Вологодская городская Дума. Решение №301 от 25 августа 2005 г. «О принятии Устава муниципального образования "Город Вологда"», в ред. Решения №649 от 4 мая 2011 г «О внесении изменений в Устав муниципального образования "Город Вологда"». Вступил в силу 1 января 2006 г.. Опубликован: "Вологодские новости", №34, 31 августа 2005 г. (Vologda City Duma. Decision #301 of August 25, 2005 On the Adoption of the Charter of the "City of Vologda" Municipal Formation, as amended by the Decision #649 of May 4, 2011 On Amending the Charter of the "City of Vologda" Municipal Formation. Effective as of January 1, 2006.).
- Законодательное Собрание Вологодской области. Закон №371-ОЗ от 4 июня 1999 г. «О вопросах административно-территориального устройства Вологодской области», в ред. Закона №2916-ОЗ от 7 декабря 2012 г. «О внесении изменений в Закон области "О вопросах административно-территориального устройства Вологодской области"». Вступил в силу со дня официального опубликования. Опубликован: "Красный Север", №124–125, 29 июля 1999 г. (Legislative Assembly of Vologda Oblast. Law #371-OZ of June 4, 1999 On the Matters of the Administrative-Territorial Structure of Vologda Oblast, as amended by the Law #2916-OZ of December 7, 2012 On Amending the Oblast Law "On the Matters of the Administrative-Territorial Structure of Vologda Oblast". Effective as of the day of the official publication.).
- Правительство Вологодской области. Постановление №178 от 1 марта 2010 г. «Об утверждении реестра административно-территориальных единиц Вологодской области», в ред. Постановления №686 от 25 июня 2012 г. «О внесении изменений в некоторые Постановления Правительства области». Вступил в силу 20 марта 2010 г. Опубликован: "Красный Север", №29, 20 марта 2010 г. (Government of Vologda Oblast. Resolution #178 of March 1, 2010 On Adopting the Registry of the Administrative-Territorial Units of Vologda Oblast, as amended by the Resolution #686 of June 25, 2012 On Amending Various Resolutions of the Oblast Government. Effective as of March 20, 2010.).
- Законодательное Собрание Вологодской области. Закон №1103-ОЗ от 6 декабря 2004 г. «Об установлении границ муниципального образования "Город Вологда" и наделении его статусом городского округа», в ред. Закона №2809-ОЗ от 5 июля 2012 г. «О внесении изменений в отдельные законы области, устанавливающие границы и статус муниципальных образований области». Вступил в силу через 10 дней со дня официального опубликования (21 декабря 2004 г.). Опубликован: "Красный Север", №242, 11 декабря 2004 г. (Legislative Assembly of Vologda Oblast. Law #1103-OZ of December 6, 2004 On Establishing the Borders of the Municipal Formation of the "City of Vologda" and on Granting It Urban Okrug Status, as amended by the Law #2809-OZ of July 5, 2012 On Amending Various Laws of the Oblast, Establishing the Borders and the Status of the Municipal Formations of the Oblast. Effective as of after 10 days from the day of the official publication (December 21, 2004).).
- Законодательное Собрание Вологодской области. Закон №1112-ОЗ от 6 декабря 2004 г. «Об установлении границ Вологодского муниципального района, границах и статусе муниципальных образований, входящих в его состав», в ред. Закона №2809-ОЗ от 5 июля 2012 г. «О внесении изменений в отдельные Законы области, устанавливающие границы и статус муниципальных образований области». Вступил в силу через 10 дней со дня официального опубликования. Опубликован: "Красный Север", №242, 11 декабря 2004 г. (Legislative Assembly of Vologda Oblast. Law #1112-OZ of December 6, 2004 On Establishing the Borders of Vologodsky Municipal District, on the Borders and Status of the Municipal Formations It Comprises, as amended by the Law #2809-OZ of July 5, 2012 On Amending Various Laws of the Oblast, Establishing the Borders and the Status of the Municipal Formations of the Oblast. Effective as of after 10 days from the day of the official publication.).
- Brumfield, William. Vologda Album (Moscow: Tri Kvadrata, 2005) ISBN 5-94607-050-9 (in English and in Russian)
- Vinogradova, E. A.; Fedyshin, I. N.; Fedyshin, N. N. (2013). "Икона из Вологодского Спасо-Всеградского собора "Спас Всемилостивый (Обыденный)" и её списки в собрании Вологодского музея-заповедника" [The Icon «Saviour, the Most Merciful (everyday)» and Its Copies in the Collection of Vologda Museum]. Вестник Псковского Государственного Университета. Серия: Социально-Гуманитарные Науки (in Russian) (2). Vologda: Pskov State University: 188–202.
