= Aleksandr Kuzmin =

Soviet and Russian architect (1951 - 2019)

- Александр Викторович Кузьмин
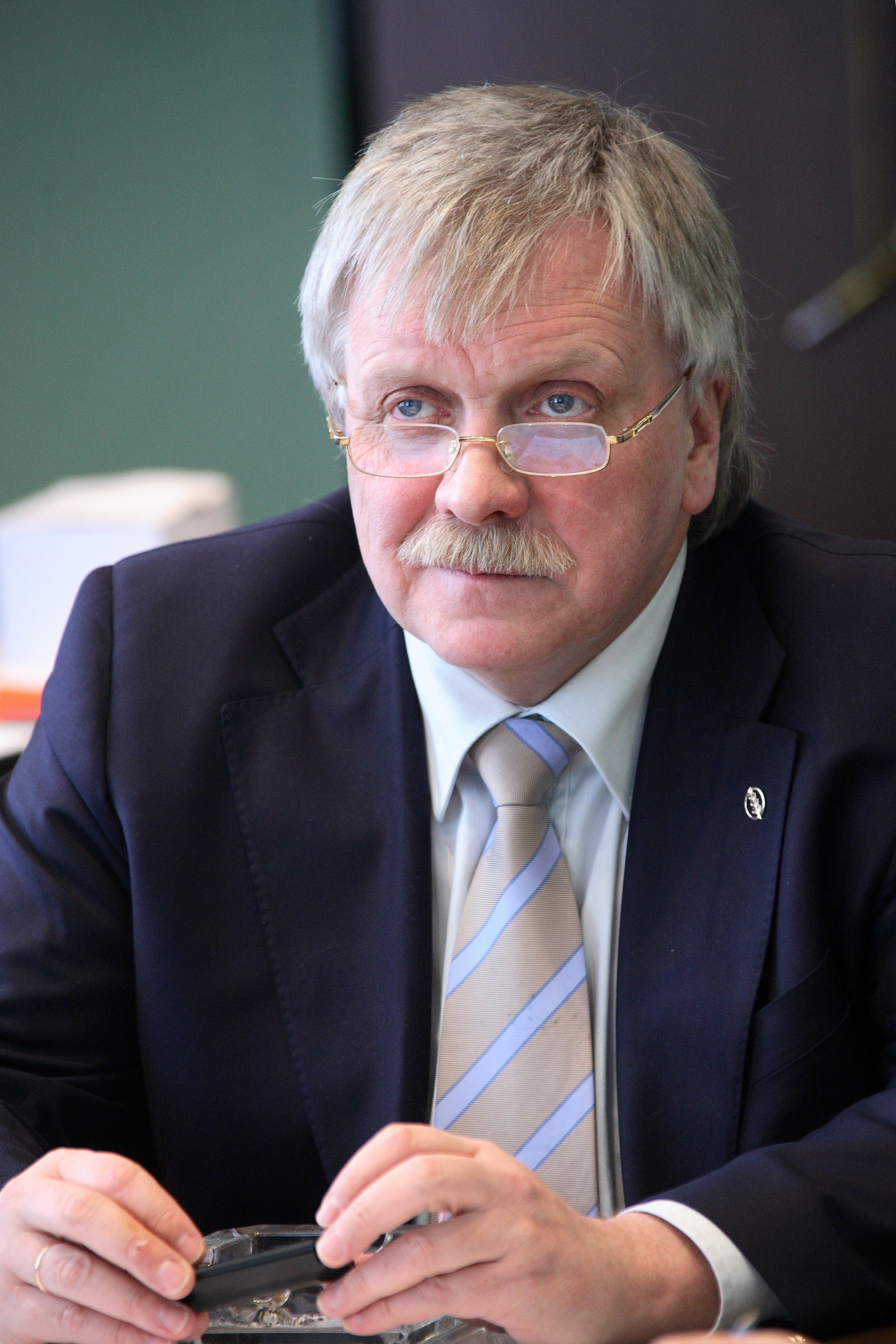
- Born: 12 July 1951 (age 75); Moscow, RSFSR
- Died: September 26, 2019 (aged 68); Moscow
- Resting place: Vagankovo Cemetery
- Citizenship: Soviet, Russian
- Education: Moscow Architectural Institute
- Occupation: Architect
- Awards: Ordre des Arts et des Lettres, People's Architect of Russia, Honoured Architect of Russia, State Prize of the Russian Federation, Presidential Certificate of Honour

Aleksandr Viktorovich Kuzmin (Russian: Александр Викторович Кузьмин; 12 July 1951 - 26 September 2019) was a Soviet and Russian architect, president of the Russian Academy of Architecture and Construction Sciences, general director of JSC Research Center Construction, chief architect of the city of Moscow (1996–2012), full member of the Russian Academy of Arts, and professor and academician of the International Academy of Architecture. He was awarded People's Architect of the Russian Federation (2003), Honored Architect of the Russian Federation (1997), and Honorary Builder of Russia and Moscow.

== Biography ==
Born in Moscow, in Sokolniki District in the family of a military sailor on July 12, 1951. Since childhood, he loved to draw, graduated from art school, and in the ninth grade he learned about the existence of the Moscow Architectural Institute and began attending preparatory courses. Later, Kuzmin repeatedly called himself an "accidental architect". In 1974 he graduated from the Moscow Architectural Institute.

From 1974 to 1991 he worked at the Genplan Institute of Moscow, rising from an architect to the chief architect of the institute.

In 1991, he was appointed first deputy and then first deputy chairman of the Committee on Architecture and Urban Planning of the city of Moscow. From September 1996 to June 2012 he served as Chairman of the Moscow Architecture Committee, chief architect of the federal city of Moscow. He was considered a conductor of the architectural ideas of Yuri Luzhkov, the "Luzhkovian" style. Under Kuzmin, many significant changes took place in the appearance of Moscow: the transformation of Manezhnaya Square and the appearance of the Peter the Great Statue, the demolition and re-construction of the Voentorg building and the Hotel Moskva, the concept of restoring the Manezhnaya Square, the development of the territory of Khodynka Field and the layout of Tsaritsyno Park.

In April 2009, he was elected vice-president of the Russian Academy of Architecture and Construction Sciences. He was also a member of the board of the Union of Architects of Russia and the Union of Moscow Architects, Chairman of the Council of Chief Architects of the constituent entities of the Russian Federation and municipalities, Chairman of the Council of Chief Architects of the CIS capitals.

In April 2010, he defiantly left the hearings of the Civic Chamber of the Russian Federation, dedicated to criticism of the general plan for the development of Moscow until 2025. At the end of 2011, he was reappointed to the post of head of the department by the new mayor of Moscow, Sergey Sobyanin "for the mayor’s term of office", becoming one of the few officials who retained their position after the resignation of Yuri Luzhkov.

On July 12, 2012, he resigned from the post of chief architect of the city of Moscow.

From October 2012 to April 2014, he was vice president and chief architect of Avtotor Holding. In September 2013 he founded the Architectural Laboratory AK and Partners LLC.

By order of the Federal Agency for State Property Management dated March 7, 2014 No. 127-r, he was appointed General Director of OJSC Kucherenko Central Research Institute of Structures Construction.

On April 17, 2014, he was elected by the general meeting of the Russian Academy of Architecture and Construction Sciences, and on May 28, 2014, he was approved by Order of the Government of Russia as President of the RAASN.

Kuzmin is the leader, author and co-author of more than 60 major urban planning projects and scientific works, including “Main directions of urban development of Moscow and the Moscow Oblast for the period until 2010”; "Draft Master Plan for the Development of Moscow for the Period until 2020"; "Proposals for the development and reorganization of industrial zones in Moscow"; "Main directions of conservation and development of territories of the natural complex of Moscow"; construction projects of the Moscow Ring Road, the third and fourth transport rings of Moscow; "Project for the reconstruction of the Moscow Circular Railway for passenger traffic" and others.

In 2013, leading teams of authors, he developed and prepared for approval by the Government of the city of Kaliningrad the "Planning Project for the Cluster of Full-Profile Automotive Production and a New Residential Area", "The Concept for the Development of the Historical Center of Sergiyev Posad of the Moscow Oblast" (“Slow City”), as well as on behalf of Governor of the Irkutsk Oblast - “Concept for the development of the historical center of Irkutsk.”

Kuzmin was the leader and author of more than 30 completed architectural projects, including "Restoration of the Old Gostiny Dvor", "Restoration of the Manege"; planning project for the "Tsaritsyno Natural-Historical Park"; "Concepts for the development of the Khodynskoye field territory"; projects of the Ice Palace in Krylatskoye and the Children's Olympic Village, the project for the construction of a complex of administrative buildings in Moscow-City; pedestrian bridge projects across the Moscow River; projects of monuments to the Soldiers of the Internal Troops, to the 200th anniversary of the Ministry of Internal Affairs, to the Warriors of the Anti-Hitler Coalition, Charles de Gaulle, Alisher Navoi, Nizami Ganjavi, Sergei Korolev and many other complex urban planning, architectural and planning works, volumetric construction and reconstruction projects, monumental and decorative art objects.

Author of more than 10 laws submitted to the Moscow City Duma and adopted.

Author of an essay in three volumes “Batone and Head” (2016) [source not specified 651 days], author of the illustrated collection “Kuzminki” (2011), compiler of the encyclopedic publication “Knights of the Military Order of the Holy Great Martyr and Victorious George for the period from 1914 to 1918 "(2008).

He was interested in Russian history and was a fan of FC Dynamo Moscow.

Alexander Kuzmin died on the night of September 27, 2019 at the age of 68. He was buried at the Vagankovo Cemetery.

Political offices
Preceded by Leonid Vavakin	Chief Architect of Moscow; 1996—2012	Succeeded by Sergey Kuznetsov
