= Gehl =

Gehl is a surname. Notable people with the surname include:

- Edward J. Gehl (1890–1956), American jurist
- Gunnar Gehl (born 2001), American singer-songwriter
- Jan Gehl (born 1936), Danish architect and urban designer
- Julius Gehl (1869–1945), German politician
- Katherine Gehl (born 1966), American businesswoman and published author

== See also ==
- Gehl Architects, a Danish urban research and design consulting firm
- Gehl Company, a defunct American manufacturing company
