= Leonid Vavakin =

Russian architect and urban planner (1932–2019)

- Леонид Васильевич Вавакин
- Born: 6 April 1932 (age 94); Moscow, RSFSR
- Died: August 23, 2019 (aged 87); Moscow
- Education: Moscow Architectural Institute
- Occupation: Architect
- Awards: State Prize of the Russian Federation (1994), State Prize of Ukraine in the Field of Architecture,
- Projects: Master plans for the cities of Anapa, Arzamas, Vladivostok, Kaliningrad, Nizhny Tagil, Omsk, Saratov, Sverdlovsk, Sochi, Stavropol, Tayshet, Tuapse, Tula, Shakhty, Elista

Leonid Vasilyevich Vavakin (Russian: Леонид Васильевич Вавакин; 6 April 1932 – 23 August 2019) was a Soviet and Russian architect and urban planner, chief architect of Moscow (1977, 1987–1996), and chief architect of the Moscow region (1977–1981). He was an honored architect of the RSFSR (1981), Honorary Architect of the Russian Federation (2001), Academician of the Russian Academy of Architecture and Construction Sciences (1992; Vice-president in 1996–2003), Russian Academy of Arts (1995), and professor.

== Biography ==
Vavakin was born in Moscow on April 6, 1932. In 1956 he graduated from the Moscow Architectural Institute with a degree in architecture.

From 1956 to 1978 he worked at the State Institute of Urban Design of the RSFSR, rising from an architect to the chief architect of the institute.

In 1977, he was appointed head of the Main Architectural and Planning Department of Moscow. In the same year, he moved to the position of chief architect of the Main Architectural and Planning Directorate of the Moscow Regional Executive Committee (chief architect of the Moscow Oblast)

From 1981 to 1987 he worked as Deputy Chairman of the State Committee for Civil Construction and Architecture (Gosgrazhdanstroy) of the USSR.

From 1987 to 1996 he served as head of the Main Architectural and Planning Department of Moscow, Committee for Architecture and Urban Planning of Moscow (chief architect of the city of Moscow) and was involved in the creation of a new master plan for the city.

From 1989 to 1991, he served as the elected People's Deputy of the USSR from the Union of Architects of the USSR and a member of the Committee of the Supreme Soviet of the USSR on Architecture and Construction.

From 1996 to 2003, he was vice-president of the Russian Academy of Architecture and Construction Sciences.

In March 2014, he supported the annexation of Crimea and signed a letter to Russian president Vladimir Putin in support of the annexation.

He died at the age of 88 on August 23, 2019. He was buried in Moscow at the Troyekurovskoye Cemetery.

Political offices
Preceded by Gleb Makarevich	Chief Architect of Moscow; 1987—1996	Succeeded by Aleksandr Kuzmin
