= Georgy Yusin =

Russian architect

Georgy Semyonovich Yusin (June 29, 1950, Moscow — April 16, 2022, Moscow) was a Soviet and Russian architect, academician of the Russian Academy of Architectural and Construction Sciences (RAASN), Honoured Builder of Moscow and Russia, member of the Union of Architects of Russia, Honoured Worker of Moscomarchitecture, four-time laureate of the A. E. Gutnov Prize, Chairman of the Expert Council of the Commission of the Moscow City Duma for Strategic Development and Urban Planning of the City of Moscow, recognized authority in the fields of strategic planning for the development of national and regional settlement systems, strategies for the development of megacities, especially Moscow, and in the creation of a legal and regulatory framework for urban planning activities.

In most recent years he was responsible for the transformation of the city of Moscow into a more modern, greener, and sleeker metropolis.

== Childhood ==
Yusin was born on June 29, 1950, in Moscow. He graduated with distinction from a Specialized Foreign Language Secondary School, where intensive training in the English language was given. His father was Yusin Semyon Dmitrievich, a well known architect.

== Education ==
He studied at the Moscow Architectural Institute from which he graduated with a First-Class Honours in 1973, and then went on to do his graduate research at the Central Research Institute of Urban Planning belonging to the Federal Civil Construction Committee, defending his thesis in 1978 for the degree of Candidate of Architecture on the topic of "Rules for planning the organisation of settlements in the regions".

== Career ==
His career started in 1973 at the Central Scientific Research Institute of Urban Planning of the Federal Civil Construction Committee.

In 1977 he joined the State Research and Design Institute for the General Plan of Moscow. He became a deputy director of Scientific Research and director of the Urban Planning Regulatory Framework Committee (1987 to 2016).

In 2004 he became head of Scientific Research at the Council of Architects of the Russian Federation, responsible for urban planning.

In 2021 he became a member of the Russian Academy of Architectural and Construction sciences. He joined its governing body and was one of the advisors to its president. He was appointed head of the Scientific Research Council of the academy.

His main areas of focus were the spatial organisation of human settlements on a given territory, the planning and design of urban spaces and the creation of a regulatory and legal framework for urban planning, harmonisation of technological standards and methods, as well as the advancement of the importance of a scientific approach to planning and design.

Yusin's colleagues described him as an 'irreplaceable' specialist.

== Main works ==
His most important projects, which he either lead, organised or supervised include:

- The design of a general scheme of urban settlement for the territory of the USSR in the years 1973-1986
- The design of the urban development of the North-Western, Central and Far Eastern parts of Russian SSR, as well as the development of the territories in the Volga-Vyatka Economic Region (1975–1986);
- Urban planning of Moscow and Moscow region (1988–2016).
- The design of a general plan for the city of Moscow; the design of separate zones within the territory of Moscow (1988–2016);
- The design of laws, rules and regulations on urban planning in the city of Moscow, including the design of the 'Urban Planning Code of the city of Moscow'. He is one of the main authors of the "Standards and Rules for Designing the General Plan and the Development of Moscow MGSN 1.01–99" (MGSN 1.01–99), approved by the Resolution of the Government of Moscow on January 25, 2000, No. 49. This document has become the most scientifically sound and universal guide in the field of planning and development of Moscow over the past fifty years, manifesting an original approach to the planning of design;
- The design of the Urban Planning Doctrine of the Russian Federation (2011–2021);
- The design of an all Russian Federation strategy for organising urban spaces and the interaction between them (2010–2021);
- A series of works in 2021-2022 forecasting the future path of urbanisation within the Russian Federation, prepared as part of a research programme run by the Ministry for Building, Housing and Planning Safety of Russia and the Russian Academy of Architectural and Construction Sciences, with recommendations on changes needed to the legal framework for urban planning and zoning within cities and regions.
