= Gleb Makarevich =

- Глеб Васильевич Макаревич
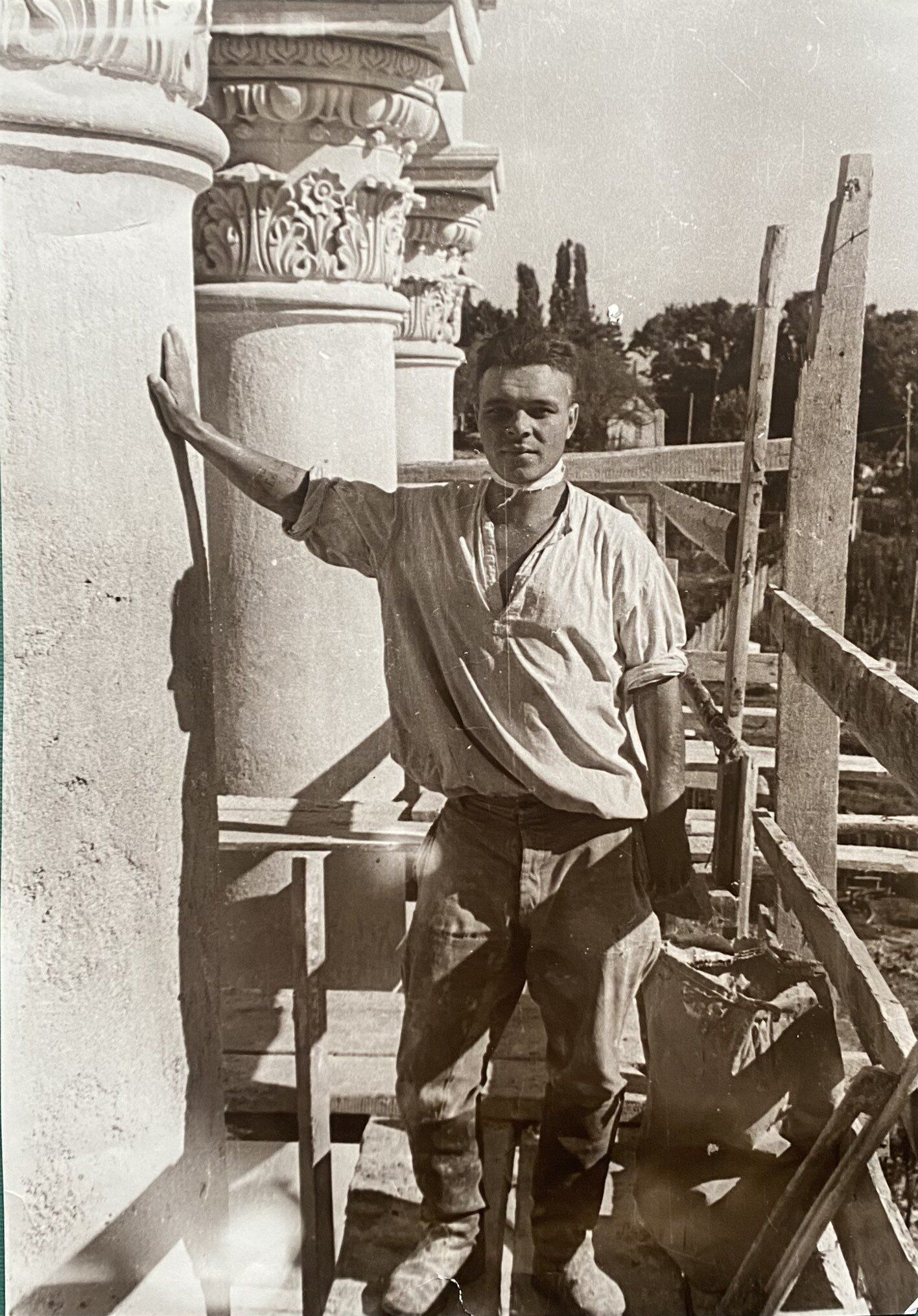
- Born: Tiflis, Democratic Republic of Georgia; May 28, 1920
- Died: December 25, 1999 (aged 79); Moscow
- Resting place: Donskoye Cemetery
- Citizenship: Soviet
- Education: Military Engineering Academy of the Red Army; Moscow Architectural Institute
- Occupations: Architect, civil engineer
- Political party: CPSU
- Awards: Order of the October Revolution, Order of the Patriotic War, Order of the Red Banner of Labour, Order of the Red Star, Order of Friendship of Peoples, Medal "For the Victory over Germany in the Great Patriotic War 1941–1945", Jubilee Medal "Twenty Years of Victory in the Great Patriotic War 1941–1945", Jubilee Medal "Thirty Years of Victory in the Great Patriotic War 1941–1945", Jubilee Medal "Forty Years of Victory in the Great Patriotic War 1941–1945", Jubilee Medal "60 Years of the Armed Forces of the USSR", Jubilee Medal "70 Years of the Armed Forces of the USSR", USSR State Prize, Honoured Architect of the RSFSR
- Buildings: Palace of Congresses

Gleb Vasilyevich Makarevich (Russian: Глеб Васильевич Макаревич; 28 May 1920, Tiflis - 25 December 1999 Moscow) was a Soviet and Russian architect and chief architect of Moscow in 1980–1987. He was a member of the Union of Architects of the USSR, Honored Architect of the RSFSR, Corresponding Member of the Russian Academy of Arts, Honorary Member of the International Academy of Architecture in Moscow and laureate of USSR State Prizes. He was also member of the Board of the Union of Architects, deputy of the Supreme Council of the RSFSR and deputy of the Moscow City Council.

== Biography ==
Gleb Makarevich was born on May 28, 1920, in Tiflis in the family of the architect Vasily Lvovich Makarevich (1893–1975), who worked in the KHRAMGESSTROY trust system in Tsalka from 1937 to 1946 during the construction of the Temple Hydroelectric Power Station.

In 1943 he graduated from the Kuybyshev Military Engineering Academy and in 1947 from the Moscow Architectural Institute. He participated in the Great Patriotic War.

From 1947 to 1961 he worked as an architect in one of the design institutes, and was a participant in the design and construction of the Palace of Congresses in the Kremlin as part of the Kremlin group of Mosproekt.

Since 1964, he worked as the head of the department for the Design of Public Buildings and Structures "Mosproekt-2" and then from 1967 as deputy head of the Main Architectural and Planning Department of Moscow.

In 1980-1987 he was the head of GlavAPU and the chief architect of Moscow. Then Makarevich Deputy Head of the Mosproekt-2 Department, Chief Architect of Workshop No. 11 for the design of the Bauman Moscow State Technical University complex. He was a member of the editorial board of the Moskovsky Rabochiy publishing house, the Moscow Architecture and Construction newspaper, and the Moscow encyclopedia.

He was married to Tatyana Andreevna Ganskaya-Reshetnikova (1920–1982), an artist. They had a son Igor Glebovich Makarevich (born 1943) who was also an artist.

== Selected works ==
- USSR KGB building (1982, Kuznetsky Most Street, 24)
- Monument to V. I. Lenin, sculptor L. E. Kerbel (1985, Kaluga Square)
- Monument-bust to N. S. Stroev, sculptor Lev Kerbel (1987, near house No. 59 on Leningradsky Prospekt)

Political offices
Preceded by Mikhail Posokhin	Chief Architect of Moscow; 1980—1987	Succeeded by Leonid Vavakin
