= Project Baikal =

- Discipline: Architecture, urbanism, and design
- Language: English
- Edited by: Elena Grigoryeva

Publication details
- History: 2004-present
- Publisher: VostokSibAcademCenter RAACS (Russian Federation)
- Frequency: Quarterly
- Open access: CC BY 4.0

Standard abbreviations
- ISO 4: Proj. Baikal

Indexing
- ISSN: 2307-4485 (print); 2309-3072 (web)
- OCLC no.: 1076399975

Links
- Journal homepage; Online access; Online archive

Project Baikal is a quarterly peer-reviewed academic journal published by the VostokSibAcademCenter of the Russian Academy of Architecture and Construction Sciences. It was established in 2004 and covers the fields of architecture, art, urbanism, and design.

The journal is abstracted and indexed by Scopus.
