= Dmitri Radygin =

Soviet and Russian architect (1940–2013)

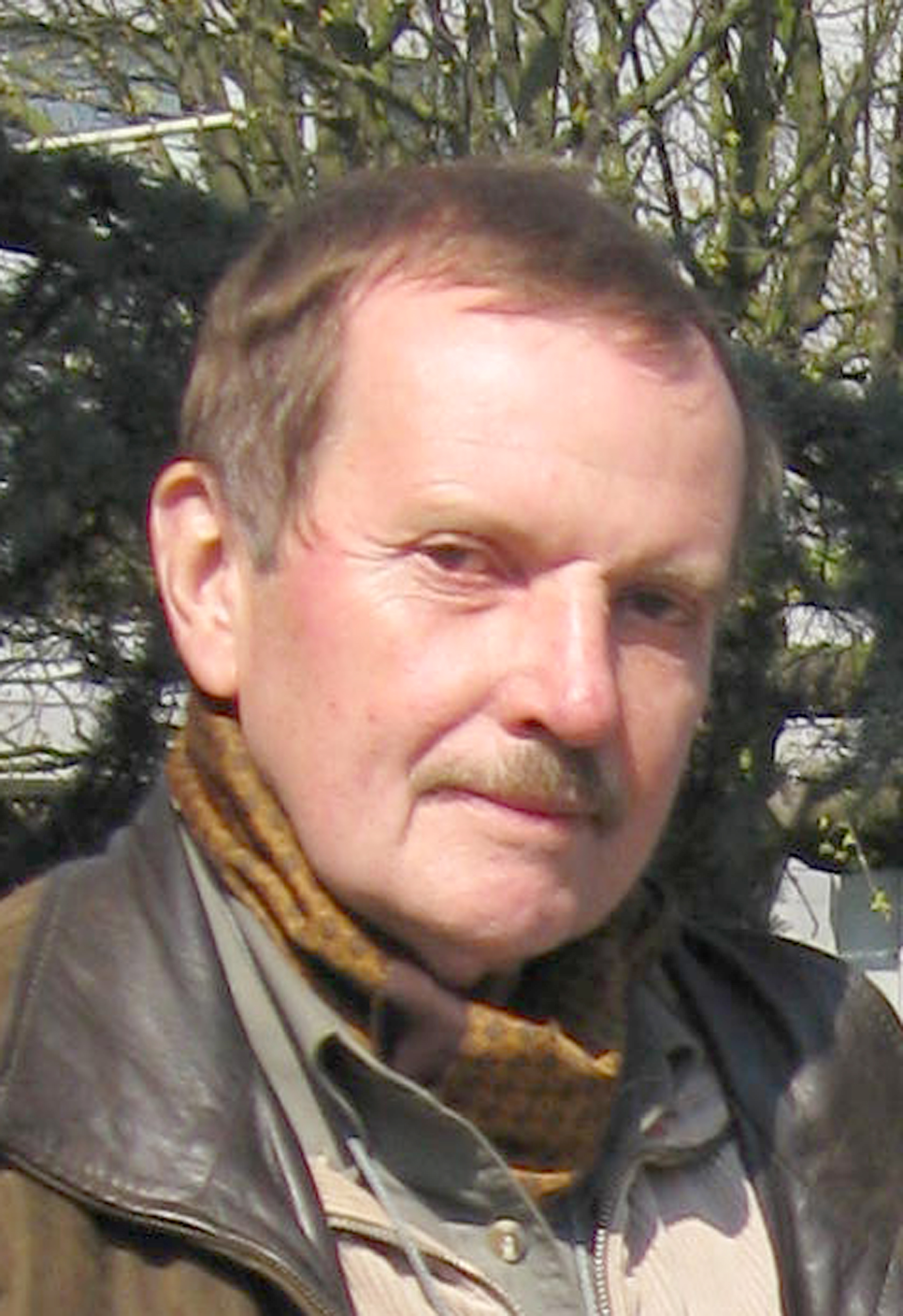
- Born: 1 August 1940; Moscow, Soviet Union
- Died: 1 July 2013 (aged 72); Moscow, Russia
- Occupation: Architect

Dmitri Fyodorovich Radygin (1 August 1940, in Moscow – 1 July 2013, in Moscow) was a Soviet and Russian architect, author of a number of projects and buildings of various types in the USSR and Russia. He was a member of the Soviet Union of Architects since 1975, winner of architectural contests, author of architectural publications, and one of the Soviet and Russian housing designers.

== Biography ==
Dmitri Radygin was born to a family of an army officer. His father, Fyodor Radygin, was a professor at the Orenburg Higher Military School, and his mother, Olga Alexeyeva, was an artist. In 1957 Radygin graduated with honors from a high school in Orenburg – then in 1963, from the Moscow Institute of Architecture. Since 1968 he had worked in various Soviet design offices, and in 1992 co-founded (along with his wife, architect T. A. Pekhter) the architectural bureau "LISA" (other members included S. V. Borisov, I. A. Hlimanova, A. A. Lauberbah, A. M.Kuznetsov, Y. A. Belkina, etc.), of which he was the chief architect.

For more than 40 years of professional activity Radygin designed and built several series of low-rise residential buildings, several community centers and settlements, and more than 100 individual houses and townhouses. Projects and buildings by Radygin made a significant contribution to the shape of the cities and towns of his country. One of his most important, interesting and well-known public projects designed and built in 1994–1995, is the headquarters' complex of RAO UES Company on the Academician Chelomey Street in Moscow.

More than 60 of his projects and buildings were featured in Russian professional magazines New House, Modern House, Home and Interiors, Beautiful House and others. The facets of his professional credo, distinguishing his projects (from cottages, estates, villages to churches and chapels) are comfort, humanity, scale and striking architectural image. Radygin participated in numerous architectural contests for residential and public buildings, where the vast majority of his works were awarded. His dissertation on the methods of residential design is still sought after.

== Selected projects ==
=== Residential buildings ===
==== Prototype projects of single-family houses ====
- "SOVA" 2011.
- "ARLEN"^{2} (together with architects Pekhter T.A. and Kuznetsov A.N., and engineer Degtyareva S.A.). Built in the village of Starvill, Moscow region, 2010.
- "LYUPELLA"^{2} (together with architects Pekhter T.A. and Kuznetsov A.N., and engineer Degtyareva S.A.). Built in the village of Starvill, Moscow region, 2009.
- "Yaser"^{2} (together with architects Pekhter T. A., Borisov S.V. and Rutman I.V., and engineer Degtyareva S.A.). Built in the village of Knyazhie Ozero, Moscow region, 2009.
- "SAPSAN"^{2} (together with architects Pekhter T.A., Borisov S.V. and Hlimanova I.A., and engineer Degtyareva S.A.). Built in the village of Knyazhie Ozero, Moscow region, 2008.
- "V.A." ^{2} (together with architects Pekhter T.A. and Lauberbah A.A, and engineer Degtyareva S.A.). Built in the settlement of Lesnye Dali, Moscow region, 2007.
- "Alenik" ^{2} (together with architects Pekhter T.A. and Lauberbah A.A. and engineer Degtyareva S.A.). Built in the Vorschikovo settlement, Voskresenskoye district, Moscow region, 2007.
- "OLGANA"^{2} (together with architects Pekhter T.A. and Kuznetsov A.N., and engineer Degtyareva S.A.). Built in the village of Borzyye, Istra district, Moscow region, 2007.
- "Yaser"^{2} (together with architects Pekhter T.A., Borisov S.V., Rutman I.V., and engineer Degtyareva S.A.). Built in the settlement of Vatutinki, 2006.
- "Wright"^{2} (together with architects Pekhter T.A., Borisov S.V. and Hlimanova I.A., and engineer Degtyareva S.A.). Built in the village of Benelyuks, Moscow region, 2006.
- "LYUPELLA"^{2} (together with architects Pekhter T.A., Borisov S.V. and Hlimanova I.A., and engineer Degtyareva S.A.). Built in the village of Vaututinki, Moscow region, 2005.
- "ARLEN"^{2} (together with architects Pekhter T.A., Kuznetsov A.N., and an engineer Degtyareva S.A.). Built in the Village of New Lapino, Moscow region, 2004.
- "Wright "^{2}. (together with architects Pekhter T.A., Borisov S.V., Hlimanova I.A., and engineer Degtyareva S.A.). Built in the village of New Lapino, Moscow region, 2004.
- "INGE"^{2} (together with architects Pekhter T.A., Borisov S.V. and Hlimanova I.A., and engineer Degtyareva S.A.). Built in village of Miloradovo, Moscow region, 2003.
- "Vyalen "^{2} (together with architects Pekhter T.A. and Hlimanova I.A., and engineer Degtyareva S.A.). Built in village of Usovo, Moscow region, 2003.
- "Vyalen"^{2} (together with architects Pekhter T.A. and Hlimanova I.A., and engineer Degtyareva S.A.). Built in the village of Knyazhie Ozero, Moscow region, 2003.
- "GALNI" ^{2} (together with architects Pekhter TA, author of the architect Radygin DF, Kuznetsov, and engineer Degtyareva S.A.) Built in the village of Vatutinki, Moscow region, (repeated in thousands of communities across Russia), 2002.
- "GYULANA" ^{2} +271,8 м^{2} (together with architects Pekhter T.A. Borisov S.V. and Hlimanova I.A., and engineer Degtyareva S.A.). Built in the settlement of Lapinograd, Moscow Region, 2002.
- "КО-721" "VALETA" (together with architects Pekhter T.A. and Hlimanova I.A., and engineer Degtyareva S.V.). Built in the settlement of Baltia, Moscow Region, 2002.
- "BAO"^{2} (together with architects Pekhter T.A., Borisov S.V. and Lauberbah A.A., and engineer Degtyareva S.A.). Built in the village of Dorokhovo, Moscow region, 2002.
- "STEP"^{2} (together with architects Pekhter T.A., Borisov S.V., Hlimanova I.A., and engineer Degtyareva S.A.). Built in the settlement of Lapinograd, Moscow Region, 2001.
- "AMBO"^{2} (together with architects Pekhter T.A. and Hlimanova I.A., and engineer Degtyareva S.A.). Built in the settlement of Lapinograd, Novorizhskoe highway, Moscow region, 2001.
- "GREK" ^{2} (together with architects Pekhter T.A., Borisov S.V., Hlimanova I.A., and engineer Degtyareva S.A.). Built in the village of Pleskovo, Moscow region, 2001.
- "Krosar"^{2} (together with architects Pekhter T.A. and Hlimanova I.A., and engineer Degtyareva S.A.). Built in the village of Miloradovo, Moscow region, 2001.
- "Melpomena"^{2} (together with architects Pekhter T.A. and Hlimanova I.A., and engineer Degtyareva S.A.). Built in the village of Shulgino, Moscow region, 1998.
- Series of prototype houses for rural areas. The design office of the TsNIIEPGrazhdanselstroy. Repeated in thousands of communities across the Soviet Union in 1970s and 1980s.

==== Prototype Townhouses ====
- 45 luxury townhouses (built in the Village of Starvill, Moscow region, 2009)^{2} / 289,1 м^{2} (together with architects Pekhter T.A., Kuznetsov A.N., and engineer Degtyareva S.A.).
- "FREN"^{2} (together with architects Pekhter T.A. and Kuznetsov A.N., and engineer Degtyareva S.A.) Built in Lapinograd, Moscow Region, 2004.

=== Public Buildings ===
- "A Chapel" (together with architects Pekhter T.A, Borisov S.V. and Kupriyanov E.G., and an engineer Degtyareva S.A.). Built in the Village of Ekaterinovka, Moscow region, 2002.
- Office building of the Russian Open Joint-Stock Company for Energy and Electrification "UES of Russia" (together with architects Pekhter T.A., Egorov V.N. and Tarnashevskaya E.G.), 1990s.
- Prototype project of a Cultural, Business, Training and Information Center (together with an architect Brzhozovsky G.) Moscow, 1997.
- Multifunctional Community Center of the village (together with architects Goldfarb T.A. and Magidin V.I., and an engineer Ovakimyan N.O.) Built in the Village of Varaskino, Udmurdiya, Russian Federation, 1980.
- A Christian Greek Orthodox Church. The settlement Strigovo, Brest region, 1990s

== Selected architectural competitions ==
- Country House, Moscow region, Russia in 2006 (together with architects Pekhter T.A. and Kuznetsov A.M., and an engineer Degtyareva S. A.). International Competition "ArchCeramica. Ceramics and Architecture." Second place.
- Prototype Townhouses, Moscow region, Russia, 2005 (together with architects Pekhter T.A., Degtyareva S.A., Kuznetsov A.M.). International Competition "ArchCeramica. Ceramics and Architecture." Best work award.
- Prototype 9 - story residential buildings with an increased thermal efficiency. Moscow, USSR, 1981 (together with architects Makhanko B., Kamay V., Boroznov A., Efimov V., and Kupriyanova E. The first, second and citation awards.
- The project of a residential complex with a collective service for 1,900 inhabitants. Moscow, USSR, 1965. Second Prize.
- The project of a residential complex with a collective service for 1,860 inhabitants. Moscow, USSR, 1965. Honorable mention.
- A series of prototype houses for rural areas. Moscow, USSR, 1967, (together with architects Berkovich G.A. and Batalov A.M.). Third Prize.
- Prototype dormitory building. Moscow, USSR, 1967, (together with architects Berkovich G.A. and Batalov A.M.). The First Prize.
- A prototype 2-story apartment building. Moscow. 1967, (together with architects Berkovich G.A. and Batalov A.M.). Honorable mention.

== Gallery ==
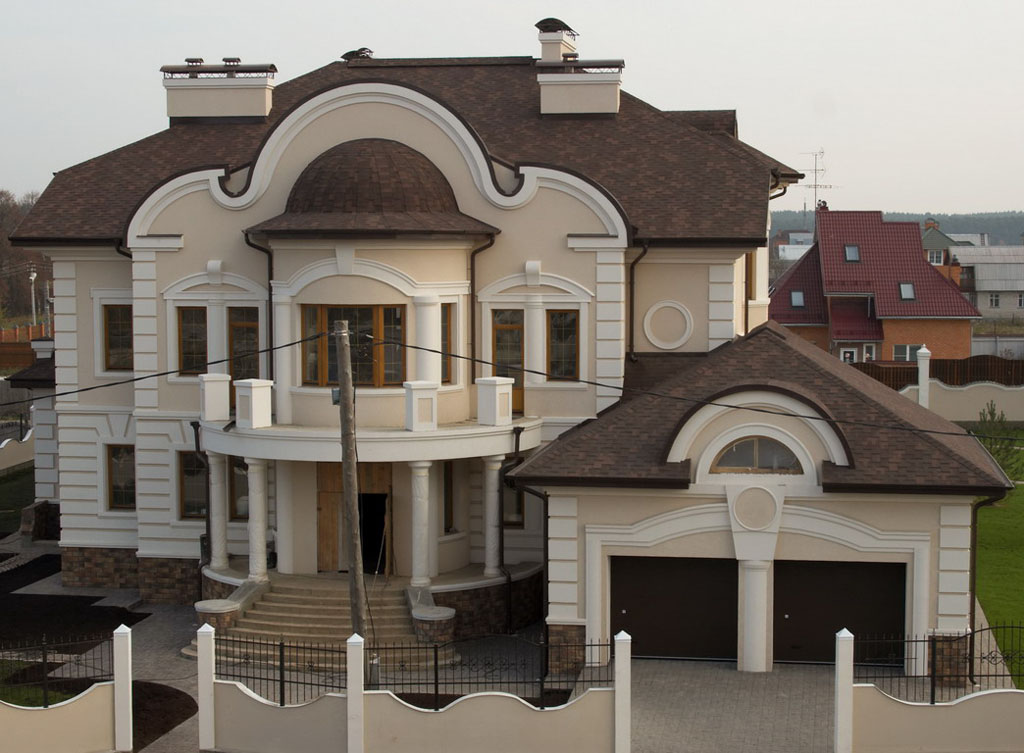
Single Family Residence Melpomena

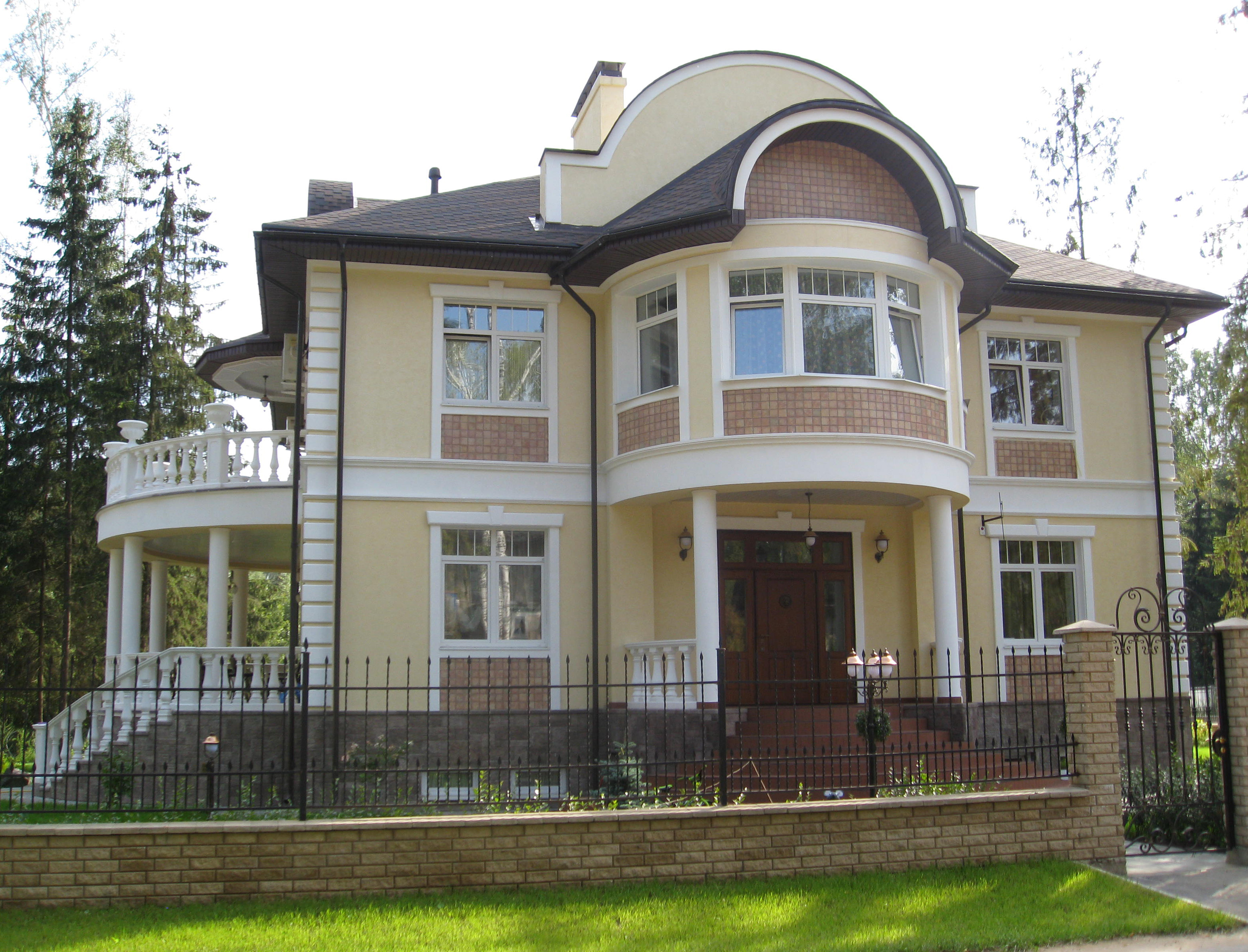
Single Family Residence Galni

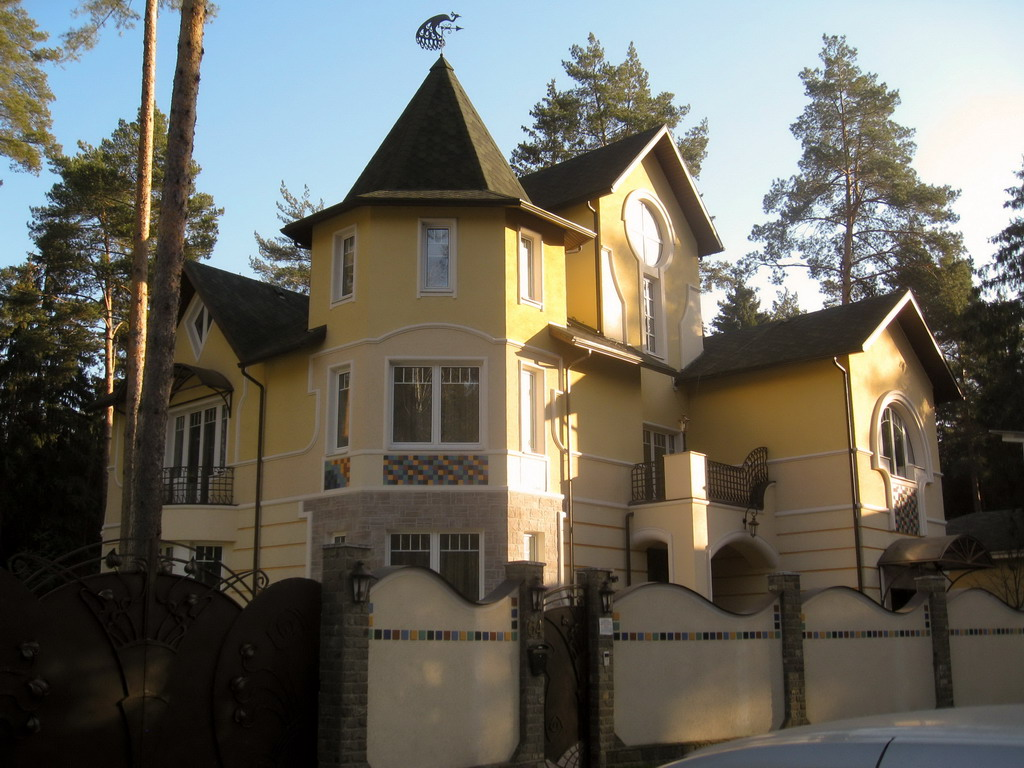
Single Family Residence Inge

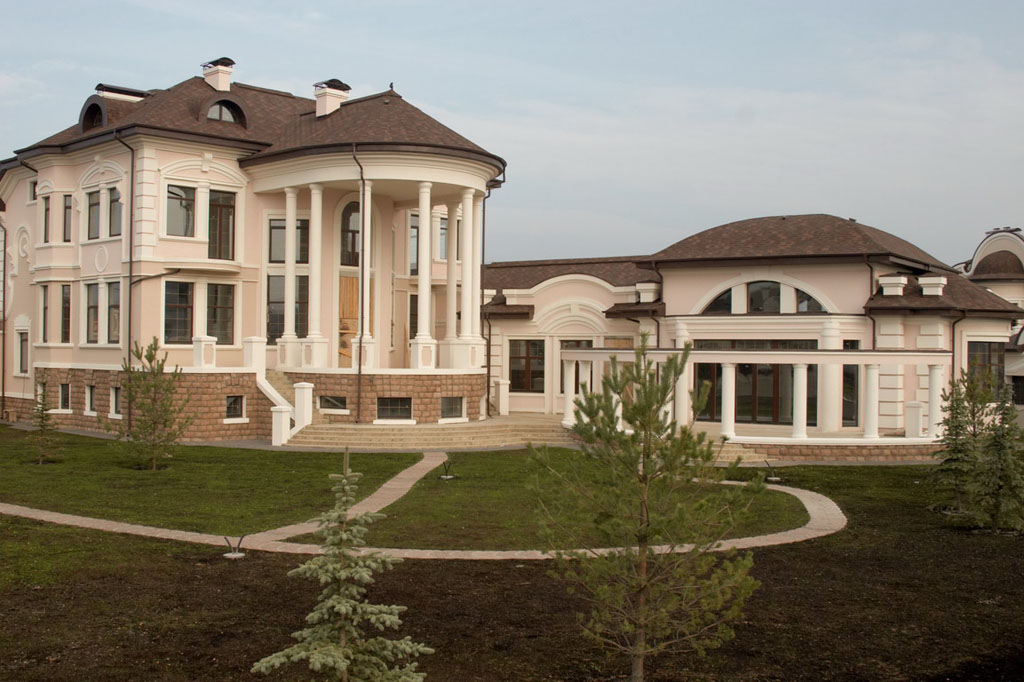
Single Family Residence Gulana

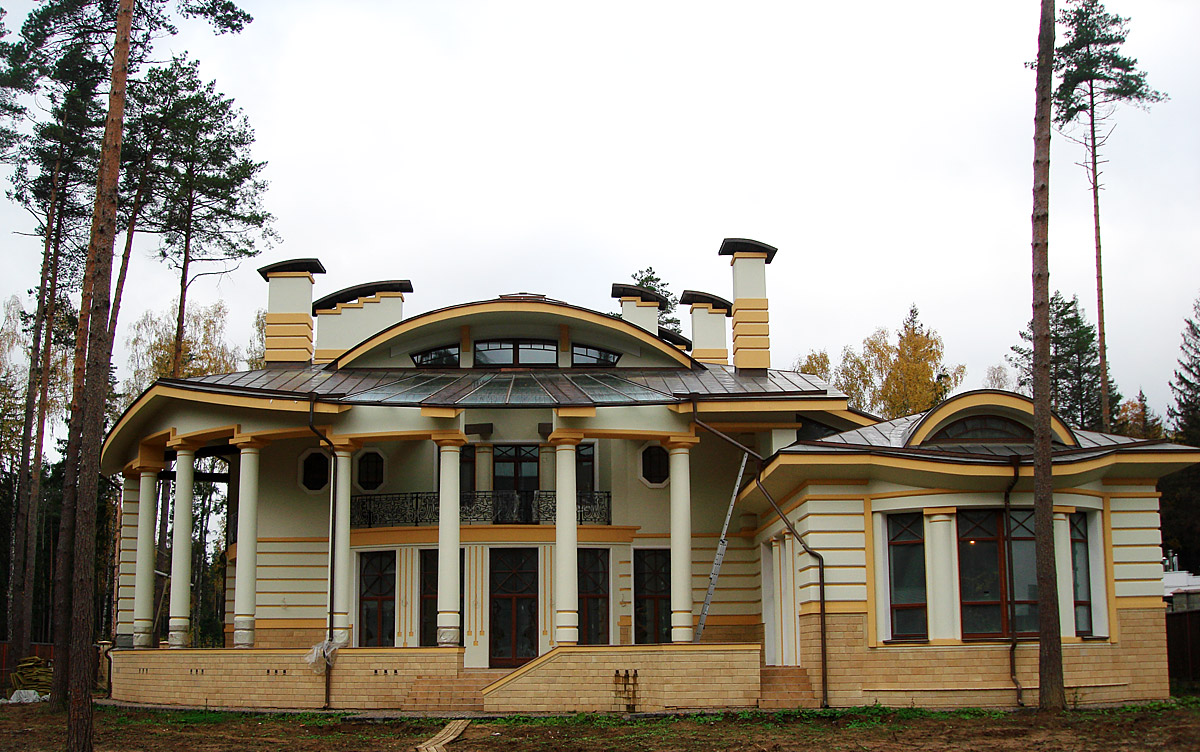
Single Family Residence Olgana

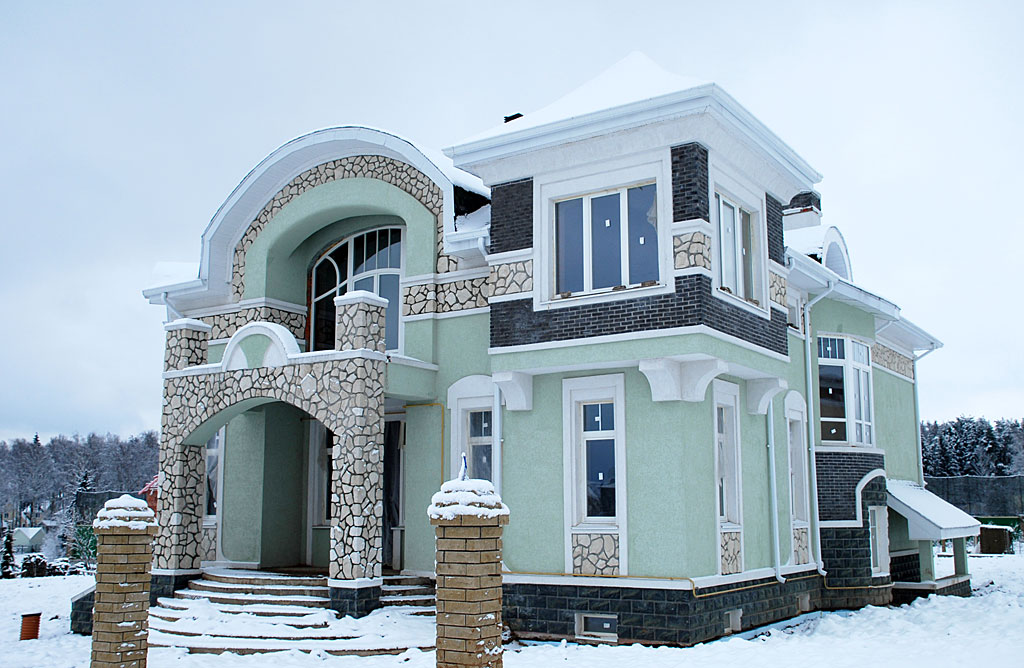
Single Family Residence Vyalen

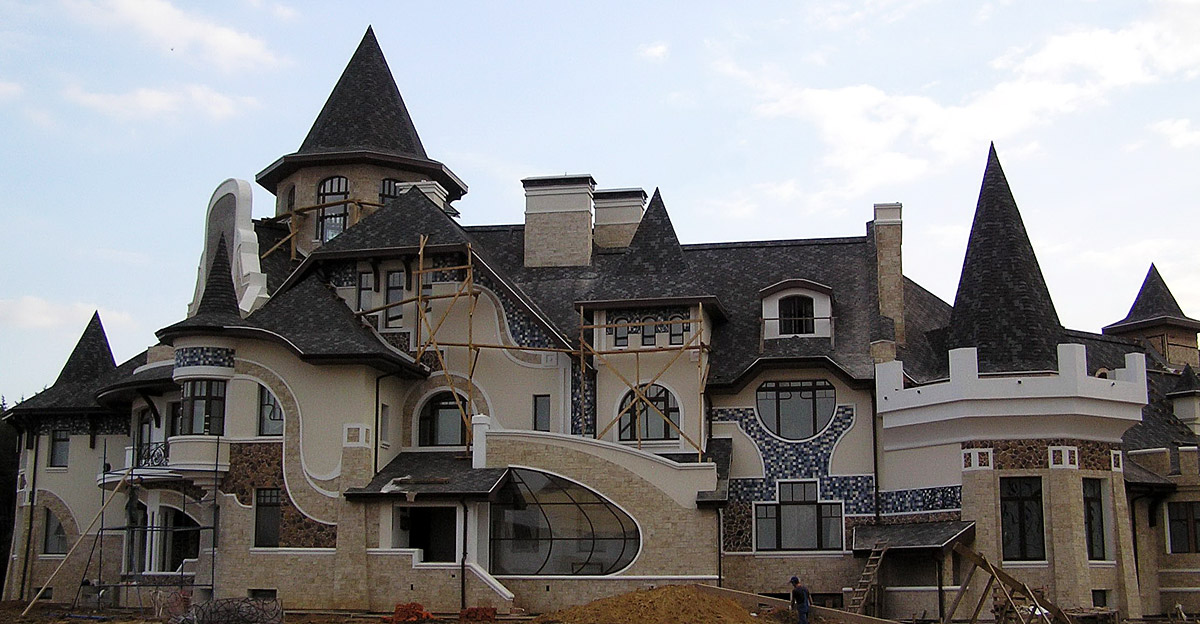
Single Family Residence Sapsan

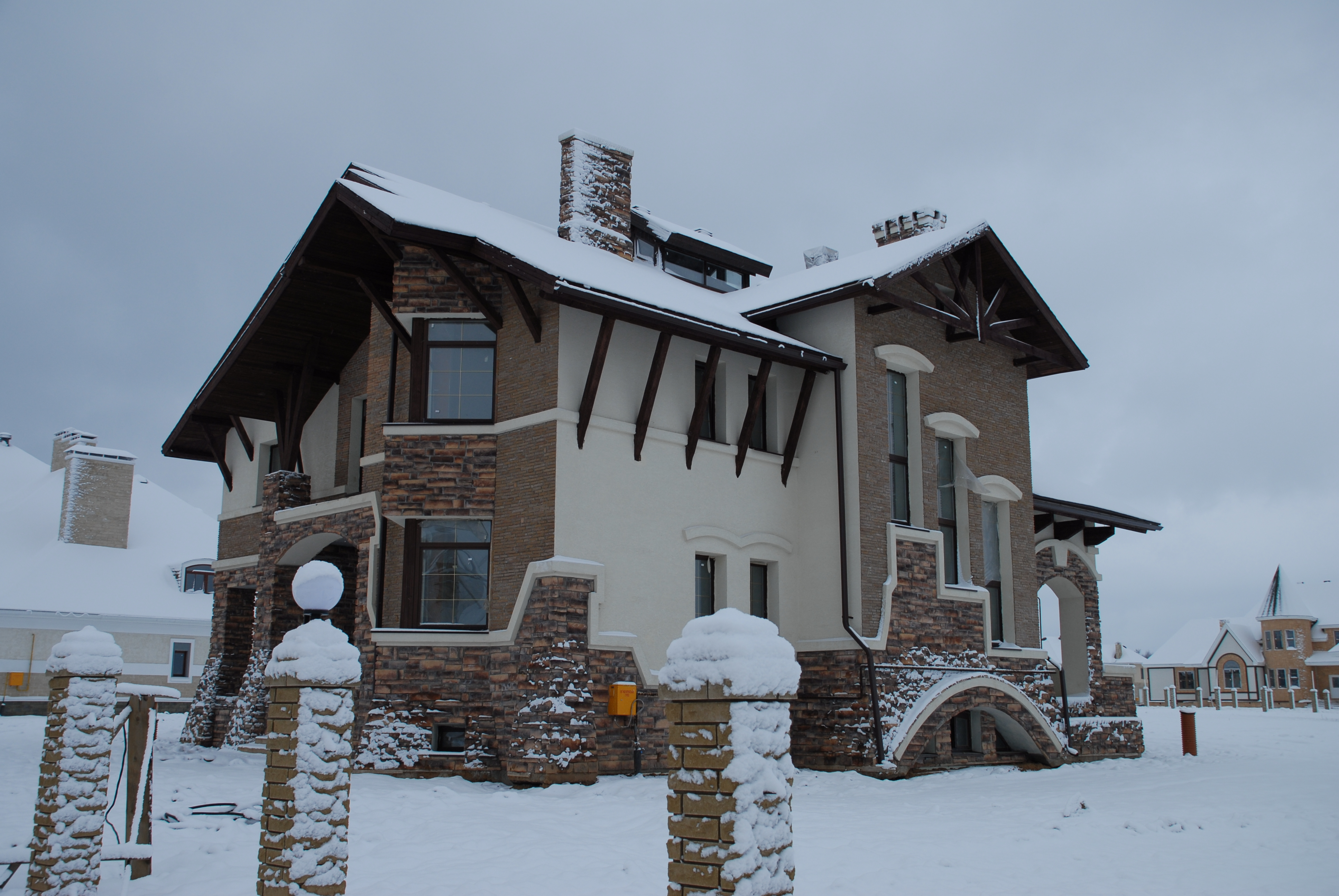
Single Family Residence Yaser

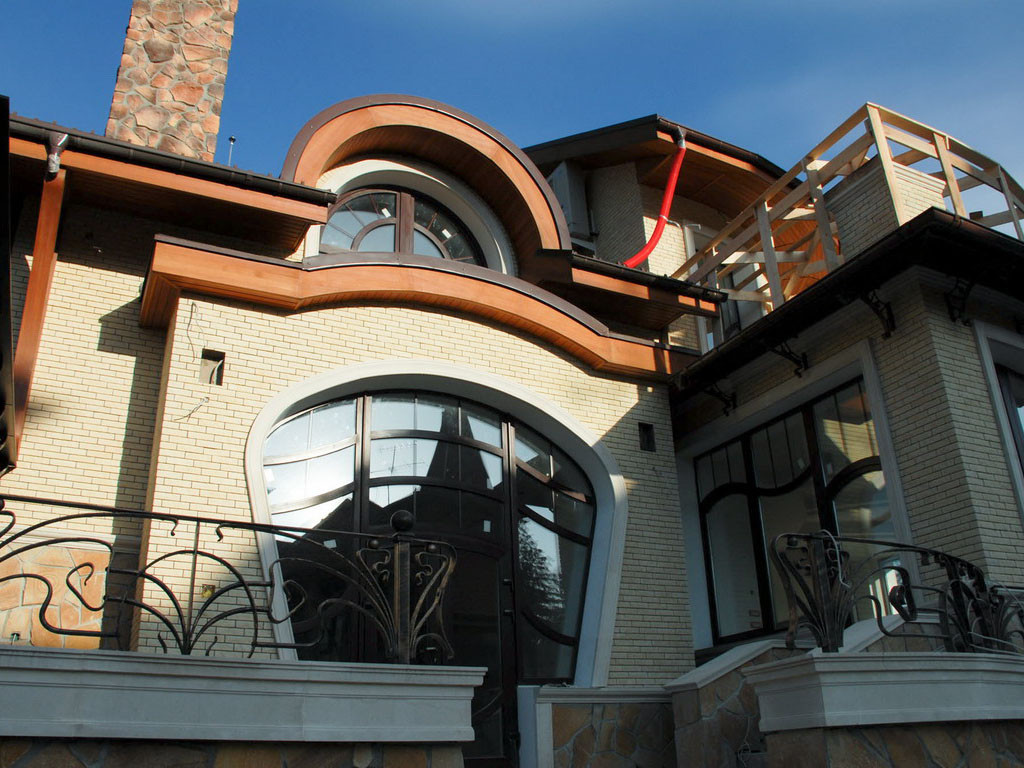
Single Family Residence Krosar

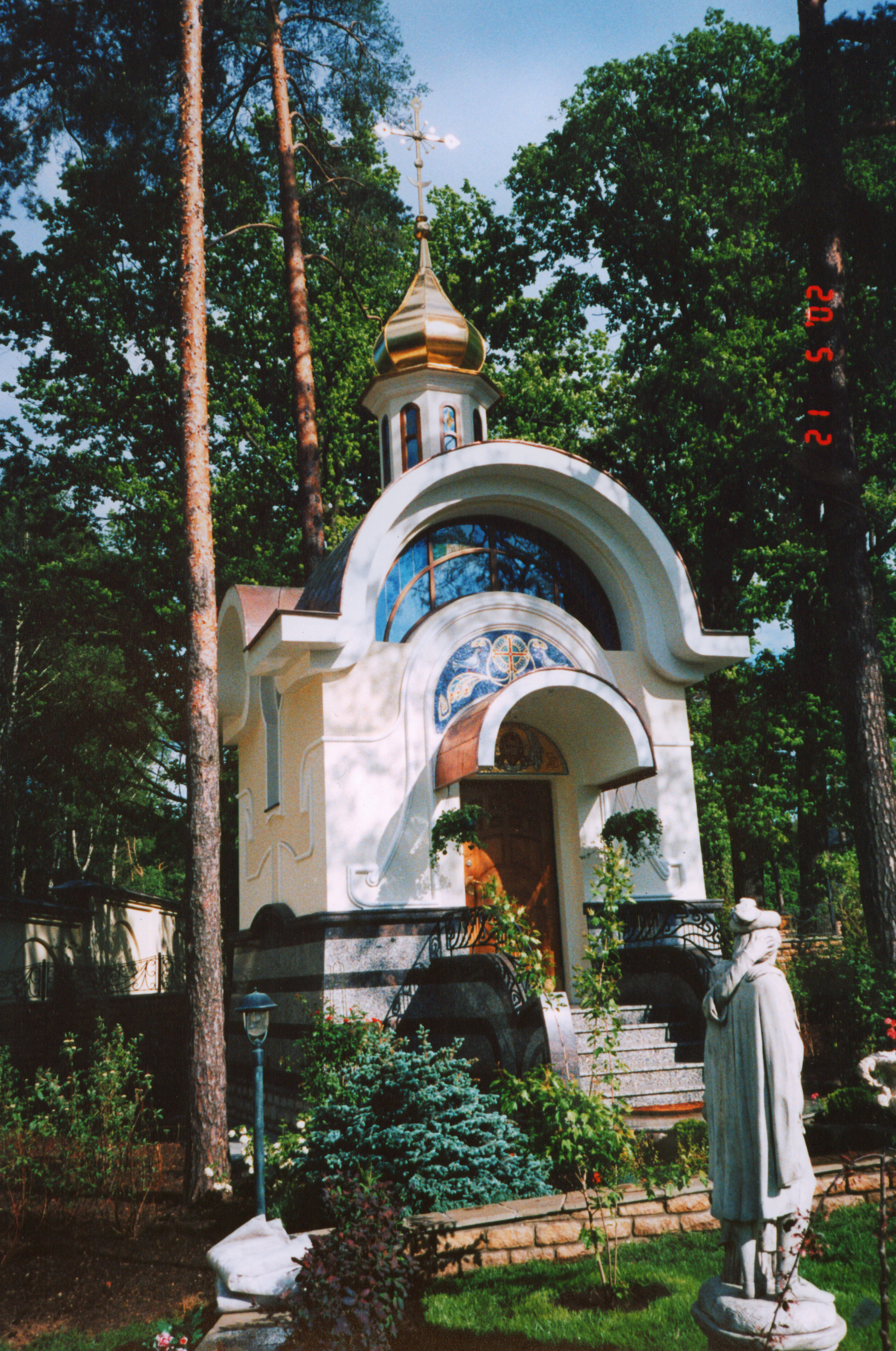
A Chapel

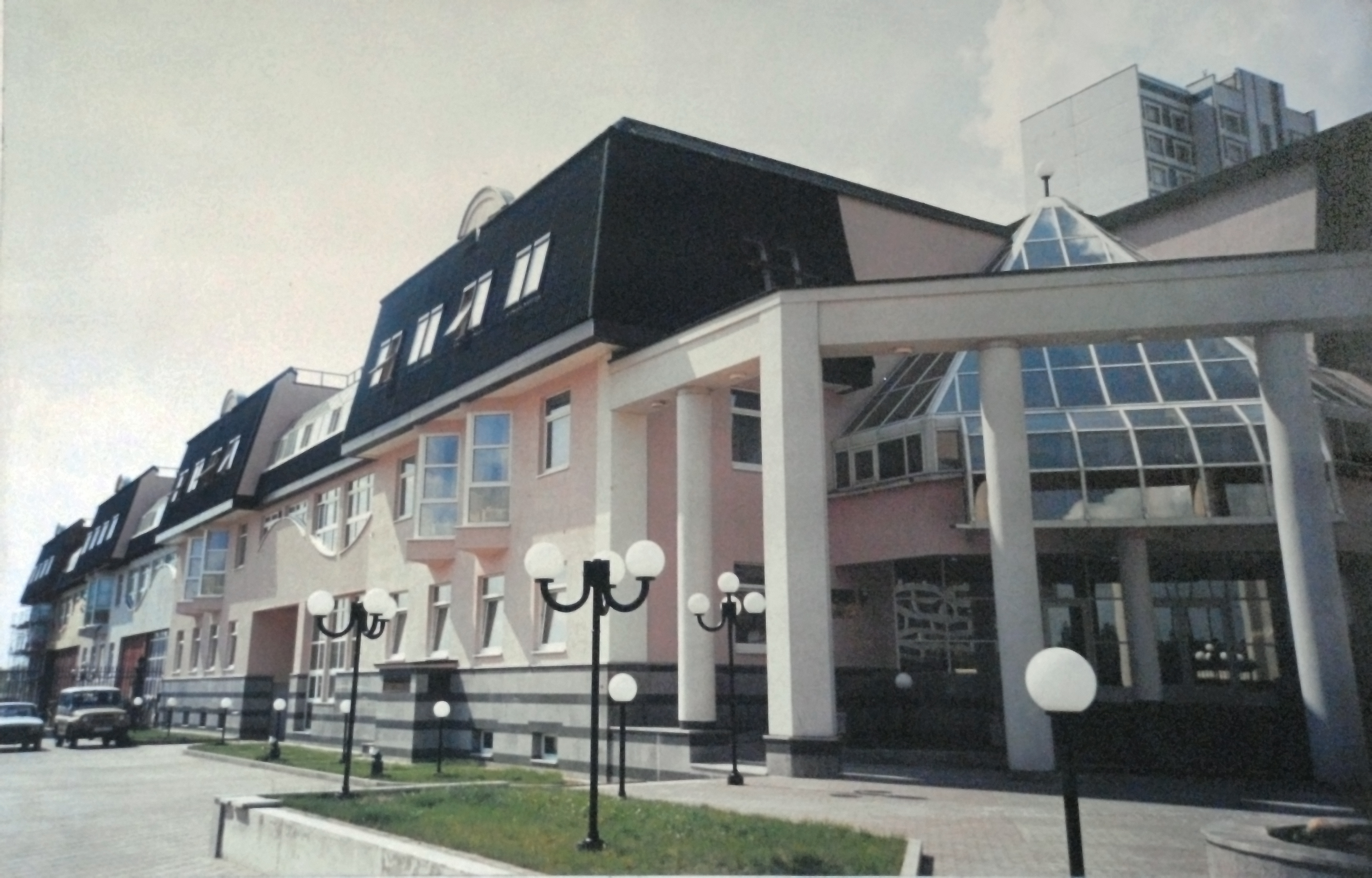
RAO Company Headquarters

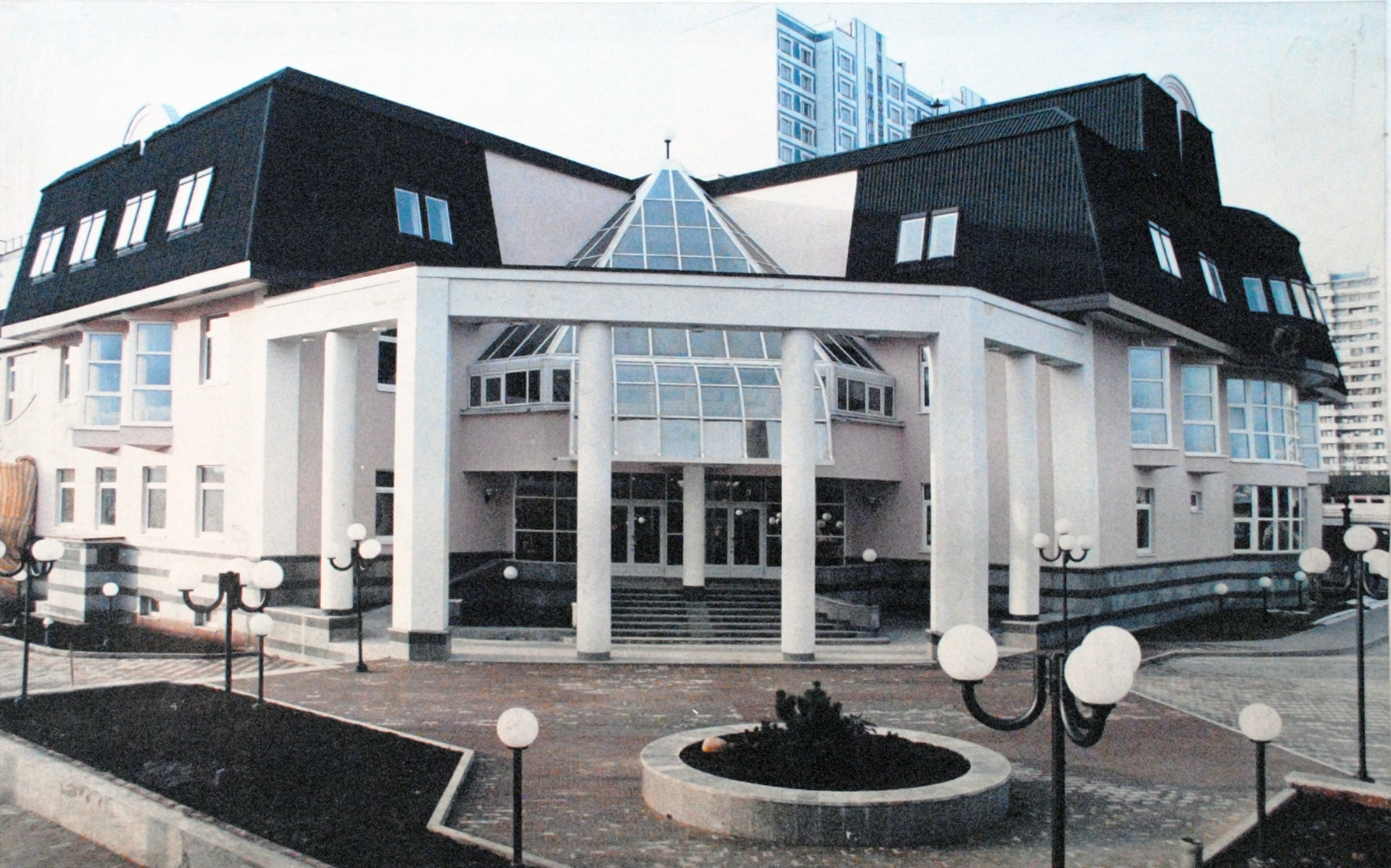
RAO Company Headquarters

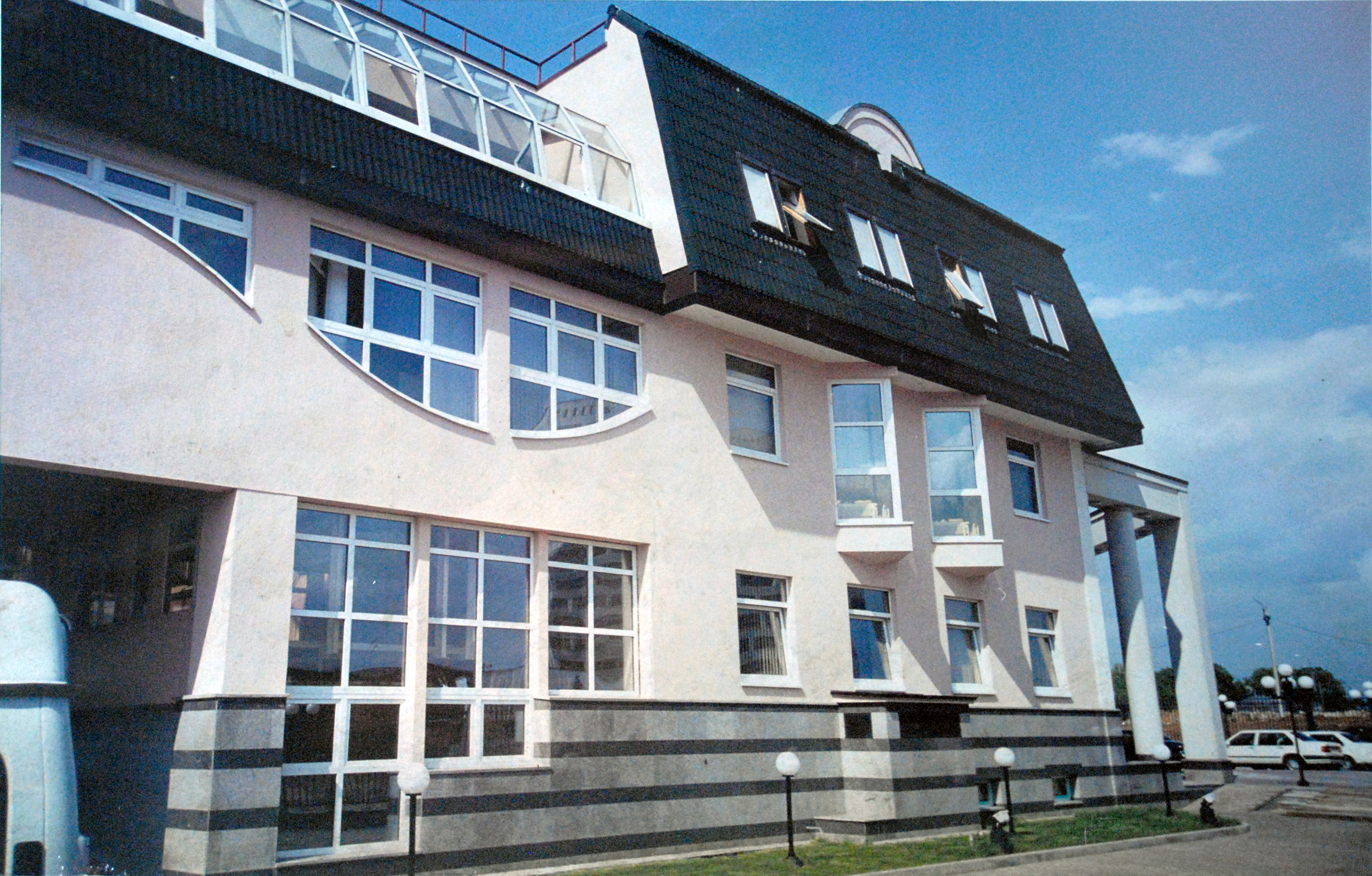
Rao Company Headquarters

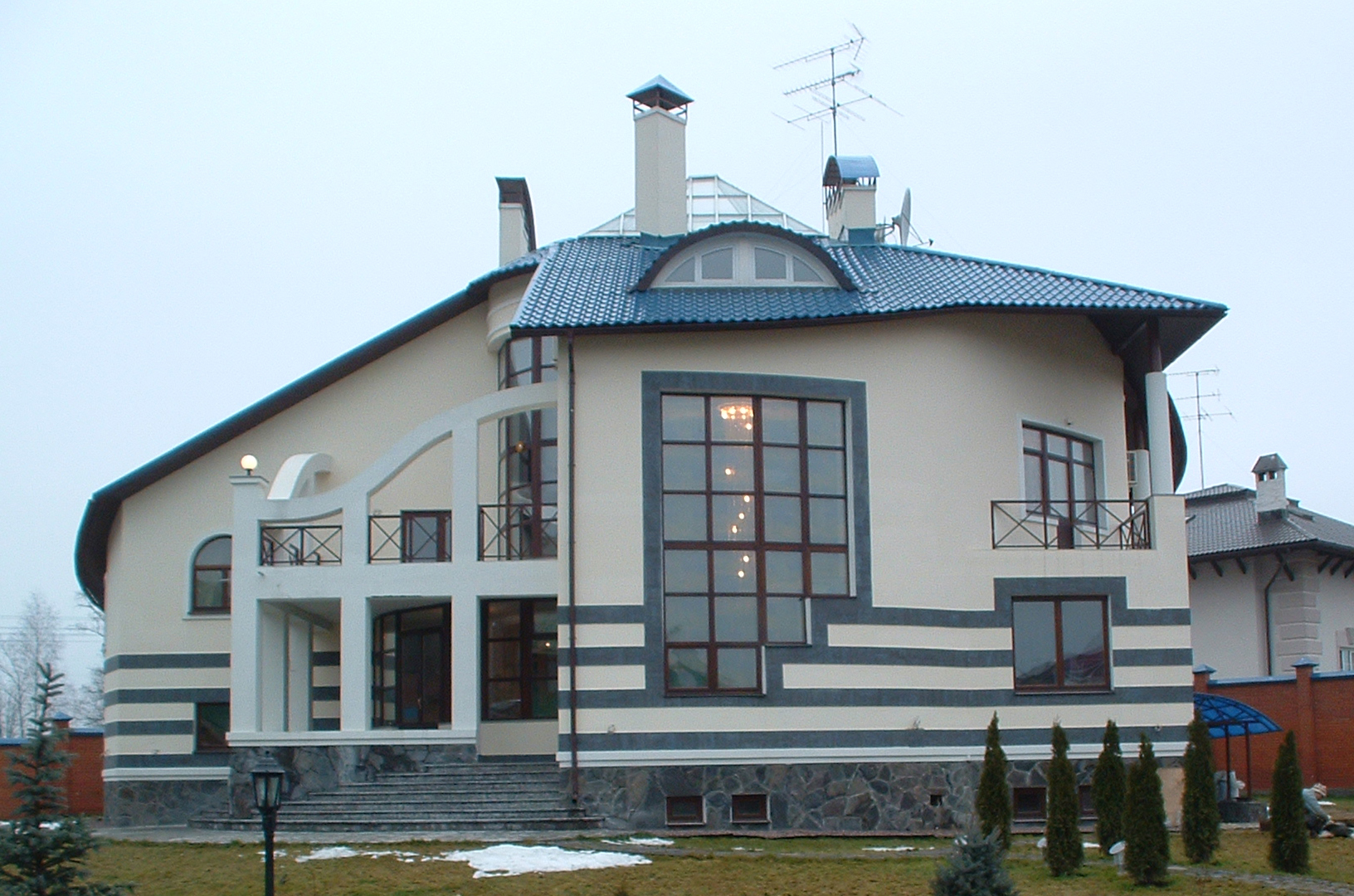
Single Family Residence BAO

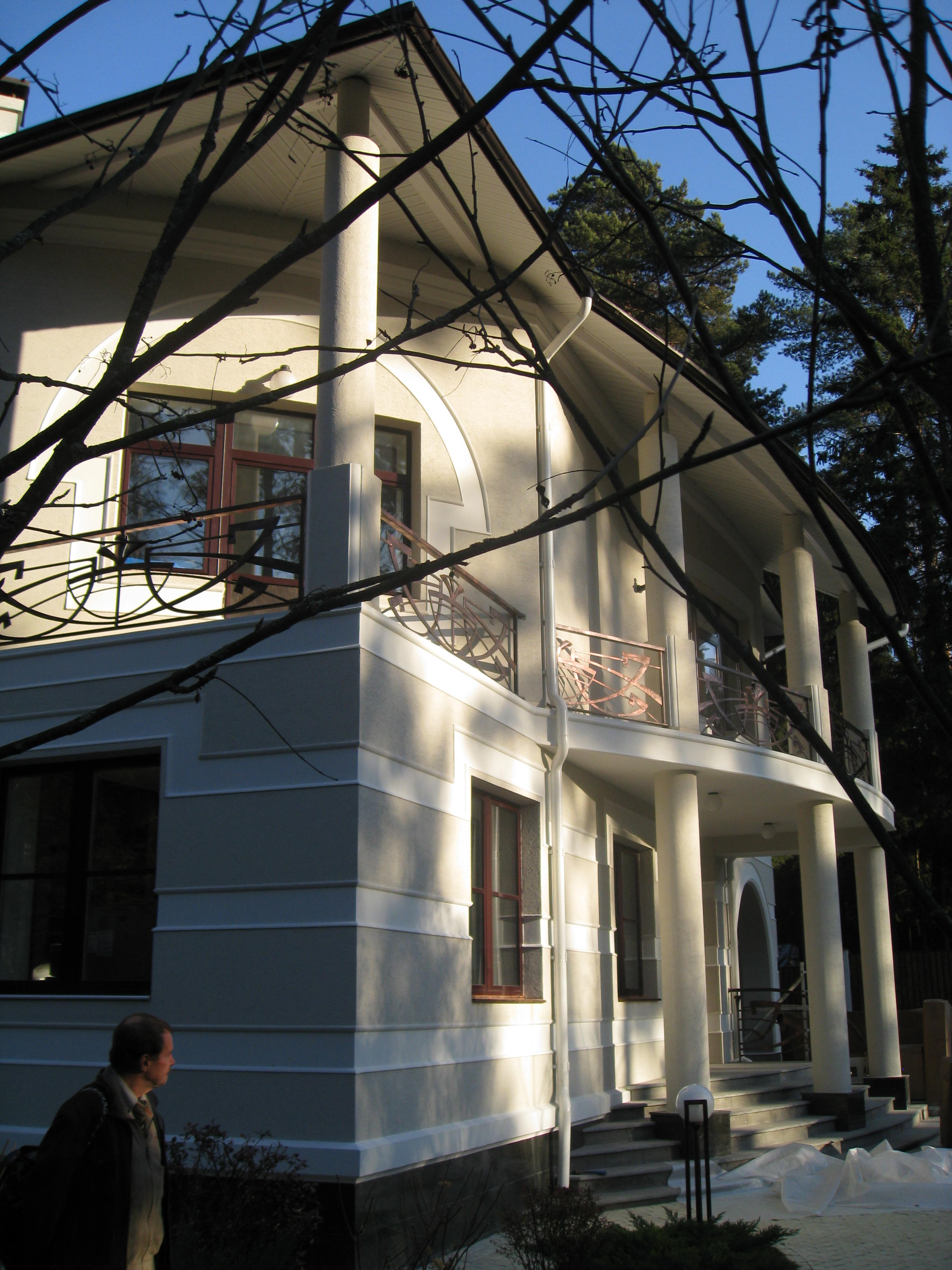
Single Family Residence V.A.

== Select publications ==
- Radygin D.F. The house, which serves as a residence as well as a working place.
- Radygin D.F. Design of rural houses on the enlarged modular grid.
- Radygin D.F. Spatial living cell in the conditions of a building.
- Radygin D.F. Method of designing the home of the typical space and layout of elements on the basis of close-up of the module. Dissertation for the degree of candidate of architecture. Moscow: Moscow Institute of Architecture, 1972
- Radygin D.F. Typical residential construction-planning cell.

== Literature ==
- Berkovich, G., Netsvetaev, L. Architect Dmitrii Radygin (Зодчий Дмитрий Радыгин). Ulianovsk University Press, Ulianovsk, 2017. ISBN 978-5-9795-1751-3.
- Borisov, S. Orthodox parish churches . Historical analysis and design methodology . Saarbrücken: LAP LAMBERT Academic Publishing, 2013 . 262 . (in Russian)
- Kormashov A. . "Art Nouveau ", " Beautiful Home " No. 3 (126) 2012, p. 46 (in Russian)
- Borisov, S. Space-planning design principles of Orthodox churches Podmoskovniy region. Dissertation for the degree of candidate of architecture. Moscow: Moscow Institute of Architecture, 2012. 221 . (in Russian)
- Sokolov, A. "On the castle, modernity and the Wizard of Oz ," " Modern Home " No. 5 (125) 2011, p. 26 (in Russian)
- Borisov S. Manor, mansion, villa. Design issues . Odessa: Politehperiodika, 2010 . 310 . (in Russian)
- Kononov, S. " Nostalgic studies on the subject of architecture. " " Modern Home " No. 7 (109) 2009, p. 16 (in Russian)
- Nekrasov, A., Shcheglov, A. Moscow Institute of Architecture of the twentieth century . Volume III. Moscow. ID Salon Press, 2006 . ISBN 5-9900157-2-0, pp. 261, 279, 364-367 . (in Russian)
- Berkovich, G. Human Subjects (Подопытные), Moscow. Fund Sergey Dubov, 2006 . ISBN 978-5-941-77015-1, pp. 185–205 . (in Russian)
- Dvoskina, N. "Lovers in a modern", " Beautiful Home " No. 5 (68) 2006, p. 14 (in Russian)
- Berkovich, G. Watching Communism Fail. McFarland, USA, 2009 . ISBN 978-0-7864-4139-6, pp. 152–163 .
- "The architecture of a big business: another look ", " Home and Interior " No. 6 for 2000 (in Russian)
- Anikin, V . "The window for the joy we have been given ." "The New House " No. March 1998, p. 6 (in Russian)
- Storozhenko. " HarLenD affair with the continuation of the " " New Home " No. June 1997, p. 16 (in Russian)
