= Rusudan Lortkipanidze =

Georgian architect, diplomat and academic (born 1947)

Rusudan Lortkipanidze (Georgian: რუსუდან ლორთქიფანიძე; born 5 August 1947) is a Georgian architect, diplomat and academic, rector of the Tbilisi State University between 2004 and 2007. She previously served as ambassador of Georgia to Italy, San Marino and the Order of Malta between 1998 and 2004.

== Career ==
Lortkipanidze was born on 5 August 1947 in Tbilisi, Georgian Soviet Socialist Republic. She got a degree in architecture from the Georgian Politechnical Institute in 1970 and got a PhD in 1993 at the Moscow Institute of Theory and History of Architecture with the thesis The Role of Historical Heritage in Modern Italian Architecture.

Between 1975 and 1997 Lortkipanidzhe was a research fellow of the Georgian National Academy of Sciences. She has been professor at the Georgian Technical University and visiting professor at the Sapienza University of Rome, as well researcher at other Italian universities.

Her diplomat career began in 1998 when was named Extraordinary and Plenipotentiary of Georgia to Italy, San Marino and the Order of Malta. She held this office until 1 October 2004 when was appointed deputy rector of the Tbilisi State University and, two months later, was appointed rector to succeed Roin Metreveli who resigned in November amid a corruption accusation, an office she held until 2007. Her election as rector was criticised by the opposition for accusing the Georgian government of wanting to take control of the country's universities as Lortkipanidze was seen a good candidate by President Mikheil Saakashvili.

In July 2005, her decision to reduce the number of faculties from 22 to six and to dismiss 800 staff members prompted a proposal from the university's professors to call her to resign.

She became honorable academician of the Roman Angel Academy of Art and the Constantine Academy of Art, Science and Literature in 2002 and honorary member of the Noble Academy in Florence.
