= Gehl Architects =

Gehl — Making Cities for People
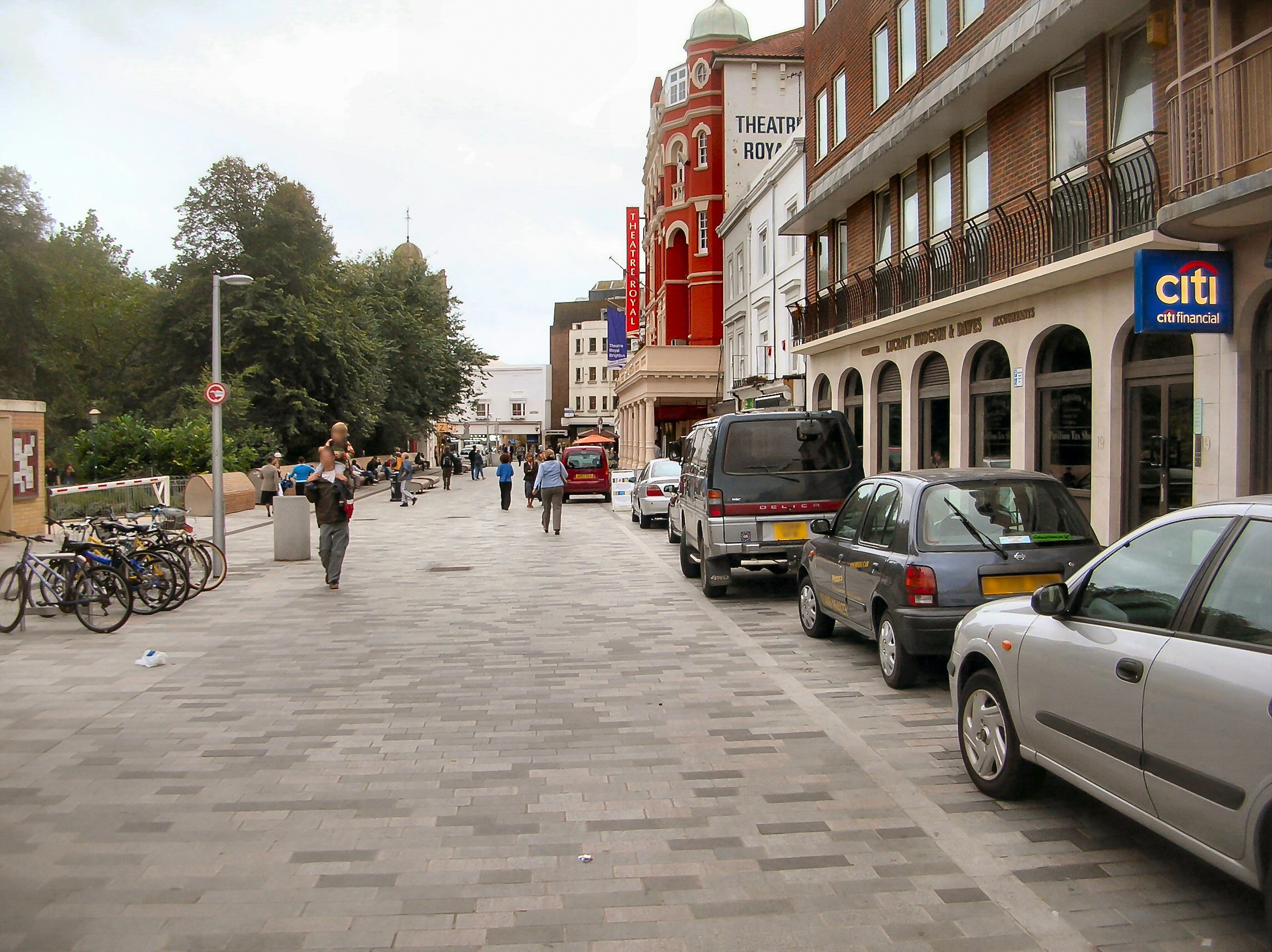
- Gehl project for Brighton New Road

Practice information
- Founded: 2000
- Location: Copenhagen

Gehl is an urban research and design consulting firm based in Copenhagen, Denmark. It was founded in 2000 by Professor Jan Gehl and urban designer Helle Søholt as a continuation of Gehl's research within the area over the past four decades. The firm specialises in improving the quality of urban life by re-orienting city design towards pedestrians and cyclists.

Gehl has participated in projects in over 50 countries and 250 cities worldwide. Clients include Municipality of Copenhagen, Department of Transportation (DOT) in New York City, Melbourne City Council, The Energy Foundation in Beijing, China, Brighton & Hove City Council in the UK, City of Christchurch in New Zealand, Institute of Genplan in Moscow, Institute for Transportation and Development Policy, a nonprofit organization headquartered in New York City, among many others.

== Publications ==
- New City Spaces by Jan Gehl & Lars Gemzøe (2000)
- New City life by Jan Gehl, Lars Gemzøe, Sia Kirknæs & Britt S. Søndergaard (2006)
- Cities for People by Jan Gehl (2010)
- How to Study Public Life by Jan Gehl & Birgitte Svarre (2013)
- Soft City by David Sim (2019)

== Awards ==
- 2013 (in partnership Christchurch City Council) Architecture of Necessity Triennale from Viserums Konsthall, Sweden.
- 2013 Nykredit Architecture Prize, Denmark
- 2009 NYC Award, New York City, USA
- 2009 Civic Trust Award for Brighton New Road Civic Trust, UK
- 2008 Landscape Institute Award, Landscape Institute, UK
- 2007 Honorary Academician, The Academy of Urbanism, UK
- Honorary Member of American Institute of Architects
- Design Futures Council Senior Fellow
