= Jan Gehl =

Danish architect

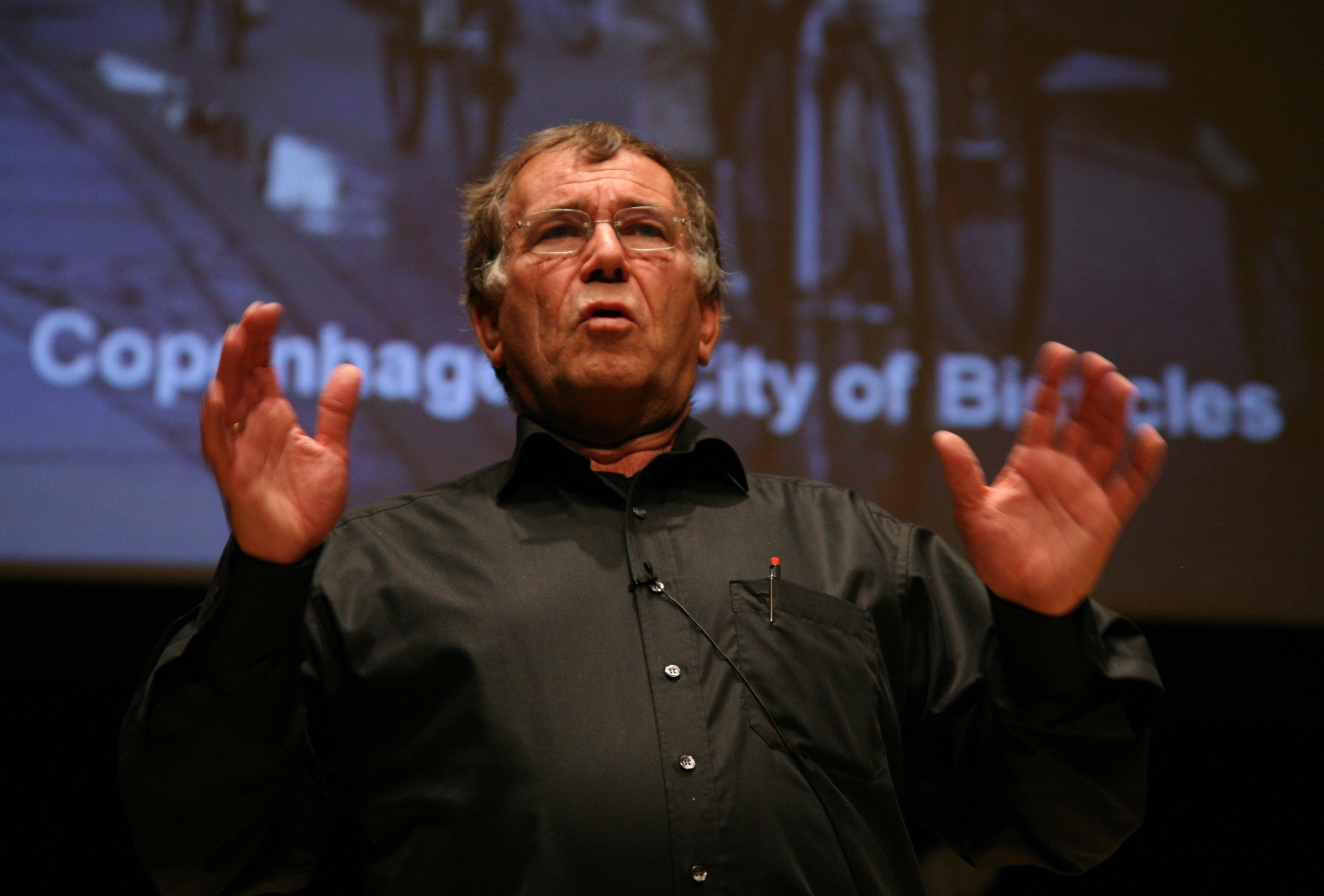
- Jan Gehl in 2006
- Born: 1936 (age 89–90); Denmark
- Education: Royal Danish Academy of Fine Arts, School of Architecture
- Occupation: Architect
- Awards: Sir Patrick Abercrombie Prize (1993); Civic Trust Award (2009); Global Award for Sustainable Architecture (2015)
- Practice: Gehl Architects

Jan Gehl (born 1936) is a Danish architect and urban design consultant based in Copenhagen. His career has focused on improving the quality of urban life by re-orienting city design towards the pedestrian and cyclist. He is a founding partner of Gehl Architects.

== Early life and education ==
Jan Gehl was born in Denmark in 1936.

He received a BA and then, in 1960, an MA in Architecture from the School of Architecture at the Royal Danish Academy of Fine Arts (KADK) in Copenhagen in 1960.

== Career ==
=== Architecture and planning ===
Gehl practised architecture from 1960 to 1966. In 1965, he and his wife Ingrid went to Italy on a scholarship from the New Carlsberg Foundation "to study the everyday use of public spaces and everyday public life in Tuscan and Umbrian cities, and in Rome". Here they were impressed by the human activity in the cities that had not been formally planned. The results of their studies were published in a series of articles in the Danish journal Arkitekten in 1966.

In 1966 he received a research grant from KADK to study "the form and use of public spaces". His book Life between Buildings (1971) reports his studies of public life in public spaces, and develops his theories about how city planning and architecture influence public life.

According to the curators of the 2017 exhibition of Gehl's work at the Danish Cultural Institute, titled Changing Mindsets – Jan Gehl's life of work, his work may be seen as three major phases:

1. From the mid-1960s: research and theory development
2. Starting in Copenhagen in the early 1970's: developing and testing methodology in real-life projects
3. From the 1990s and onwards: Communication and expansion of methods and ideas through books combined with studies for cities across the globe

He co-founded Gehl Architects in 2000 with Helle Søholt, held a partner position until 2011, retired in 2016, but as of October 2026 remains an adviser in the practice. He also continues to undertake speaking engagements.

Gehl has participated in and advised many urban design and public projects around the world:

- In 2004 he carried out an important study in to the quality of the public realm in London, commissioned by Central London Partnership and Transport for London, and supported City of Wakefield and the town of Castleford in developing and delivering better public spaces, as part of an initiative known as "The Castleford Project".
- In 2007–08 he was hired by New York City's Department of Transportation to re-imagine New York City streets by introducing designs to improve life for pedestrians and cyclists. The DOT used Gehl's work to "directly inform" the implementation of their new urban planning and design policies and projects.
- Gehl has been influential in Australia and New Zealand as well, where he prepared Public Life studies for the city centres of Melbourne (1994 and 2004), Perth (1995 and 2009), Adelaide (2002) Sydney (2007), Auckland (2008), Wellington (2004), Christchurch, Launceston and Hobart (2010).

=== Academia ===
Gehl was professor of urban planning at the Royal Danish Academy of Fine Arts from 1966 to 2006.

Between 1971 and 1978 he also spent long periods doing research as well as teaching in various countries as a visiting professor.

== Influences ==
Gehl credits the "grandmother of humanistic planning" Jane Jacobs for drawing his attention to the importance of human scale. "Fifty years ago she said – go out there and see what works and what doesn't work, and learn from reality. Look out of your windows, spend time in the streets and squares and see how people actually use spaces, learn from that, and use it".

Gehl married a psychologist, and together they "had many discussions about why the human side of architecture was not more carefully looked after by the architects, landscape architects, and planners" and "set out to study the borderland between sociology, psychology, architecture, and planning".

== Influence ==
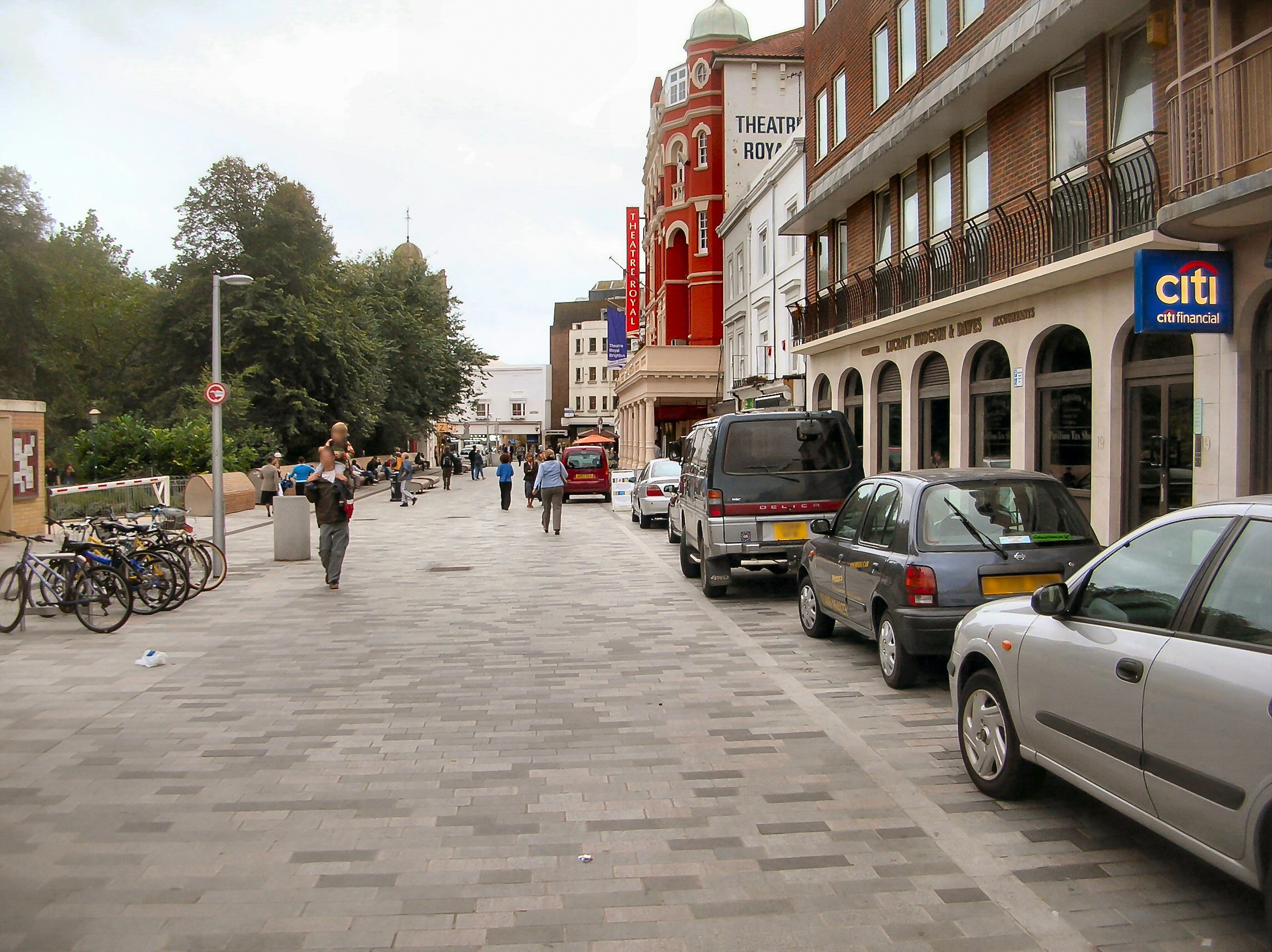
Gehl Architects' project for Brighton New Road employing shared space, awarded the UK Civic Trust Award

Gehl first published his influential Life Between Buildings in Danish in 1971, with the first English translation published in 1987, in which he advocates for a sensible, straightforward approach to improving urban form: systematically documenting urban spaces, making gradual incremental improvements, then documenting them again. This book has been published in over 40 languages. In 2012 the book was translated into a film by the same name, exhibited in a 24-metre (79 ft) curved room at the "New Nordic Architecture" exhibition Louisiana Museum of Modern Art and later at the Venice Biennale for Architecture.

Gehl's book Public Spaces, Public Life describes how such incremental improvements have transformed Copenhagen from a car-dominated city to a pedestrian-oriented city over 40 years. Copenhagen's Strøget carfree zone, one of the longest pedestrian shopping areas in Europe. The first section of Strøget was transformed to a pedestrian street on 17 November 1962, and Gehl used it as a living lab for observing people's use of public space. This book was also translated into over 40 languages.

Later his influential reports and books led to a collaboration with the City of Copenhagen and its political shift towards promoting pedestrian zones and cycling.

== Recognition and awards ==
=== Awards ===
- 1993: Sir Patrick Abercrombie Prize – for exemplary contributions to Town Planning and Territorial Development, International Union of Architects
- 1998: EDRA Award, Environmental Design Research Association, US
- 2007 Honorary Academician, Academy of Urbanism, UK
- 2008 Landscape Institute Award, Landscape Institute, UK
- 2009 NYC Award, New York City, USA
- 2009 Civic Trust Award for Brighton New Road Civic Trust, UK
- 2011 Prince Eugen Medal for outstanding artistic achievement in architecture, Denmark
- 2013: C.F. Hansen Medal
- Design Futures Council Senior Fellow
- 2015 Global Award for Sustainable Architecture
- 2018 Athena Medal, Congress for the New Urbanism
- 2019: Chartered Institution of Highways and Transportation (CIHT) Institution Award

=== Honorary fellowships ===
- Royal Institute of the Architects of Ireland
- Royal Institute of British Architects (UK)
- American Institute of Architects
- Royal Architectural Institute of Canada
- Royal Incorporation of Architects in Scotland

Planning Institutes in Australia and Ireland.

=== Honorary doctorates ===
Gehl has received honorary doctorates from a number of universities, including:

- 1992: Heriot-Watt University, Edinburgh, Scotland
- 2015: University of Toronto, Toronto, Canada
- 2016: Dalhousie University, Halifax, Nova Scotia, Canada
- 2017: Varna Free University in Varna, Bulgaria

=== Other ===
Gehl also received the key to the City of Sydney.

== Selected publications ==
- Gehl, J (1987) Life Between Buildings: Using Public Space, translated by Jo Koch, Van Nostrand Reinhold, New York. (ISBN 978-87-7407-360-4)
- Gehl, J. and Gemzøe, L. (2000) New City Spaces, The Danish Architectural Press. Copenhagen. (ISBN 978-87-7407-293-5)
- Gehl, J. and Gemzøe, L. (2004) Public Spaces, Public Life, Danish Architectural Press. (ISBN 978-87-7407-305-5)
- Gehl, J. et al. (2006) New City Life, The Danish Architectural Press, Denmark. (ISBN 978-87-7407-365-9)
- Gehl, J. (2010) Cities for People, Island Press. (ISBN 978-1597265737)
- Gehl, J. and Svarre, B. (2013) How to Study Public Life, Island Press

== See also ==
- Public space
- New Urbanism
- Transit-oriented development
