= Genplan Institute of Moscow =

Russian research organization

- Native name: Научно-исследовательский и проектный институт Генерального плана города Москвы
- Founded: June 13, 1951; 75 years ago
- Headquarters: Moscow, Russia
- Key people: Tatiana Guk
- Website: http://genplanmos.ru

The State Unitary Enterprise - Moscow General Planning Research and Project Institute (Russian: Научно-исследовательский и проектный институт Генерального плана города Москвы), also known as the Genplan Institute of Moscow (Russian: Институт Генплана Москвы) is a scientific research and design organization of the city of Moscow.

Genplan has five branch divisions: social and economic, ecological, architectural and planning, methodology of urban planning engineering, division of transport infrastructure, information system and automatization.

Genplan can performs functions of customer-developer, organizations of general designer and contractor, carry out geodesic and cartographic activity, render services in the field of protection of State secret, expert and consulting services for individuals and legal entities for town-planning and design activity.

== History ==
In 1918, several architectural workshops led by Alexei Shchusev and Ivan Zholtovsky were created under the Moscow Council. In 1932, the Architectural and Planning Committee was created under Presidium of the executive committee of the City and Moscow Council. Afterwards, the Planning Department of Moscow Council was formed in 1933, as well as of 11 planning workshops.

In 1941, the Architectural and planning Department of Moscow Council (AGTU) has been formed. Ten years later, by decree of the Council of Ministers of the USSR “on enlargement of town-planning organizations and liquidation of small design offices” was adopted on April 6, 1951. Similar documents were prepared by Moscow City Executive Committee on May 10, 1951, as well as the Department for Architecture affairs – on May 17, 1951.

As a result, in June 1951, Genplan was created. The ten year reconstruction plan of Moscow served as the basis for working out the various variants of siting, carrying out their comparative technical and economic analysis. On 1 February 1952, the Government of the USSR approved the 1951-1960 master plan. The 1952 master plan, as well as the previous one, pointed out the necessity to form a protective green zone near the borders of the capital. The idea of construction of a ring road around Moscow was also broached.

== Directors ==
- Alexander Ustinov (1951-1953)
- Nikolai Evstratov (1953-1967)
- Sergey Misharin (1967-1983)
- Valentin Ivanov (1983-1988)
- Rostislav Gorbanev (1988-1998)
- Vladimir Korotaev (1998-2004)
- Sergey Tkachenko (2004-2011)
- Ernst Mavlyutov (2011-2013)
- Karima Nigmatulina (2013-2015)
- Oleg Didenko (2015)
- Mikhail Krestmain (2015-2016)
- Oksana Garmash (2016-2018)
- Tatiana Guk (since 2018)
