= Russian Academy of Architecture and Construction Sciences =

- Российская академия архитектуры и строительных наук
- Type: National academy
- Established: 26 March 1992
- Location: 24 Bolshaya Dmitrovka Street, Moscow, Russia; 55°45′50″N 37°36′48″E
- Website: mgik.org

The Russian Academy of Architecture and Construction Sciences (RAACS or, transliterating the Russian acronym, RAASN) (Russian: Росси́йская акаде́мия архитекту́ры и строи́тельных нау́к, РААСН) is an official academy of the Russian Federation specializing in architecture and construction.

It was established by a decree of the President of the Russian Federation on March 26, 1992; its precursors were the Academy of Architecture of the USSR (1934–1956) and the Academy of Construction and Architecture of the USSR (1956–1964). It has 60 full members (academics), 115 corresponding members, 64 honorary members, and 75 foreign members from 25 countries. The academy is headquartered in Moscow and it has five regional divisions: Saint Petersburg, Volga, Uralian, Siberian, and Southern.
