= Moscow Architectural Institute =

Architecture school in Moscow, Russia

Moscow Architectural Institute (State Academy)
- Московский Архитектурный Институт (Государственная Академия)
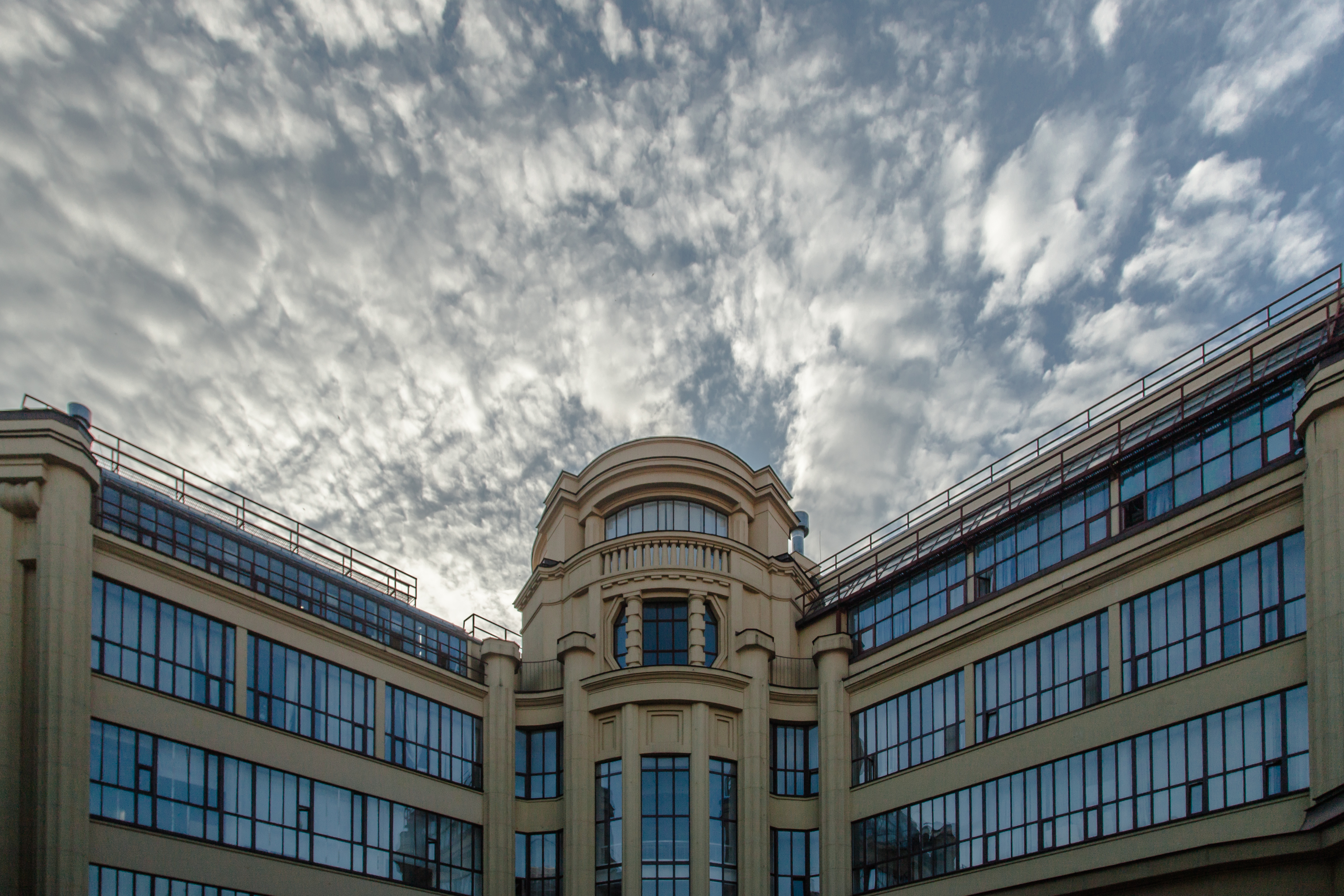
- Established: 1933
- Rector: Dmitry Olegovich Shvidkovsky
- Students: 1400
- Location: Moscow, Russia; 55°45′47″N 37°37′21″E
- Website: http://www.marhi.ru

Moscow Architectural Institute (State Academy) - MArchI (Russian: Московский Архитектурный Институт (Государственная Академия) - МАрхИ) is a famous architecture school located in Moscow, Russia. Since 1994, the Institute has been accredited by the Royal Institute of British Architects.

MArchI trains architects of wide-range specialization in Town-Planning, Architecture of Residential and Public Buildings, Architectural Design, Architecture of Industrial Buildings, Architecture of Agricultural Complexes, Theory and History of Architecture, Restoration of Architectural Monuments, Interior Architecture, Landscaping.

Since 2010, the academy releases an international electronic scientific and educational magazine "Architecture and Modern Information Technologies".

== Organization ==
The language of education is Russian. The full course of studies lasts 6 years. After that students get the diploma and can work as architects in Russia. After 5 years of education students get the bachelor's diploma.

The Rector of the university is Dmitry Olegovich Shvidkovsky.

There are 28 departments in the Academy, 10 of them are with specialized, 18 are for the whole faculty:

- Architecture of public buildings
- Architecture of industrial structures
- Architecture of rural settlements
- Urban planning
- Reconstruction in architecture
- Restoration in architecture
- Landscape architecture
- History of architecture and urban planning
- Design of Architectural Environment
- Temple Architecture

== Notable alumni ==
- Rustam Khalfin
- Svetlana Baskova
- Inna Evlannikova
- Rusudan Lortkipanidze
